= Sacred (disambiguation) =

A sacred entity is one endowed with religious significance.

Sacred may also refer to:

== Music ==
- Sacred Records, a record label founded in 1944 by Earle E. Williams
- Sacred (Los Lonely Boys album), 2006
- Sacred (Paradox album), 2004
- "Sacred", a song by Depeche Mode from the album Music for the Masses
- "Sacred", a song by Kitt Wakeley featuring Starr Parodi from the album An Adoption Story (2022)
- "Sacred", a song by Nina Nesbitt from the album The Sun Will Come Up, the Seasons Will Change

== Other ==
- Sacred (novel), a novel by Dennis Lehane
- Sacred (video game), a 2004 action role-playing game
- Sacred Microdistillery, a small distillery in London
- SACRED, a microsatellite

== See also ==
- Sacer (disambiguation)
- Sacred promontory, an ancient name for some promontories
- Sacred Way (disambiguation)
