= Smicrus (mythology) =

Mythological man

In Greek mythology and legend, Smicrus (Ancient Greek: Σµῖκρος, romanized: Smîkros, lit. 'small') is a man connected to Apollo and his oracles in both Delphi and Didyma. He is the father of Branchus, one of Apollo's male lovers who received the gift of prophecy from the god and founded a line of famous seers. Smicrus established athletic competitions in honour of the goddess Leucothea.

Smicrus' tale is attested in two major sources, Conon's lost Narrations and a lost work by Varro, both of which are quoted by later authors such as Patriarch Photius I of Constantinople.

== Mythology ==
Smicrus was either the son of Democlus, a man from Delphi, or an unnamed man from the island of Ceos. An oracle instructed Democlus to sail for Miletus, so Democlus obeyed and took his son Smicrus along, who was thirteen at the time. After having lunch, he was in such a haste to sail off that he forgot Smicrus behind. Smicrus in despair wandered for some time until he was approached by a goatherd's son, who took him to his father Eritharses, also called Patronus. Eritharses, pitying the boy, took him in and cherished him as much as he did his own son (or sons), and bid Smicrus to tend to the goats along with the other boy(s).

One day the boys caught a swan and dressed it up in a garment, and then had a row over which would present the swan to Eritharses. Eventually they grew weary of their fighting and took the garment off of the swan, which revealed itself to be the sea-goddess Leucothea. Delighted in their strife and competition over her, she instructed them to tell the Milesians to honour her by holding athletic contests for boys, or she told Eritharses to love Smicrus above all.

In time Smicrus was wedded, either to a distinguished Milesian woman or a daughter of Eritharses. She fell pregnant soon, and had a dream in which the sun entered her mouth and exited through her genitalia. When a baby boy was born, they called him Branchus (false-etymologically linked to βρόγχος, meaning "windpipe") from his mother's dream, and he ended up courting the god Apollo, founding the god's oracle at nearby Didyma and fathering a clan of great prophets, the Branchidae.

== In culture ==
Conon's version of the myth (in which Smicrus' father is a Delphian) presents either a Delphic attempt to take credit for the founding of Apollo's oracle at Didyma, or Miletus' own efforts to trace their oracle's origins back to Delphi. The Delphic origin for Branchus seems to trace back to Hellenistic poet Callimachus and his lost Branchus, a lineage which did not belong to the archaic foundation myth. The Delphic heritage would make Smicrus a descendant of Machaereus, the man who killed Neoptolemus in Delphi, another Didymaean attempt to pull the city into prominence within Apollonian circles.

Smicrus was likely a local hero associated with male coming-of-age rituals, like the ones Leucothea herself presided over, who was then connected with another local figure, Branchus, as the latter's father. Although Smicrus is commonly Branchus' father, sometimes Apollo himself is stated to be the father of the boy, although Apollo typically represents the sun in the dream; Didyma was one of the cities where Apollo's solar connections were the strongest, and the Branchid priests were held in great esteem among the lonians and Aeolians in western Anatolia.

== See also ==
- Swan maiden
- Ariadne
- Acontius

== Bibliography ==
- Conon, Fifty Narrations, surviving as one-paragraph summaries in the Bibliotheca (Library) of Photius, Patriarch of Constantinople translated from the Greek by Brady Kiesling. Online version at the Topos Text Project.
- Fontenrose, Joseph Eddy (1988). Didyma: Apollo's Oracle, Cult, and Companions. University of California Press. ISBN 0-520-05845-3.
- Grimal, Pierre (1987). The Dictionary of Classical Mythology. Wiley-Blackwell. ISBN 0-631-13209-0.
- Johnston, Sarah Iles (2008). Ancient Greek Divination. US, UK: Blackwell Publishing. ISBN 978-1-4051-1572-8.
- Lactantius Placidus (1898). Lactantii Placidi qvi dicitvr Commentarios in Statii Thebaida it Commentarivm in Achilleida recensvit Ricardvs Jahnke [Lactantius Placidus, On Statius's Thebaid] (in Latin). Translated by Jahnke, Richard. Lipsiae : in aedibvs B. G. Tevbneri. LCCN 06008769. OL 21778486M.
- Pepin, Ronald E. (2008). The Vatican Mythographers. New York City: Fordham University Press. ISBN 978-0-8232-2892-8.
- Schmitz, Leonhard (1867). Smith, William (ed.). A Dictionary of Greek and Roman Biography and Mythology. London, UK: John Murray, printed by Spottiswoode and Co. Online version at the Perseus.tufts library.
