= Paeonius =

Paeonius is a given name. Notable people with the name include:

- Paeonius of Mende, late 5th century BCE Greek sculptor
- Paeonius of Ephesus (fl. c. 420 to 380 BCE), Greek architect
