= Branchus (lover of Apollo) =

Ancient Greek seer

Branchus (/ˈbræŋkəs/; Ancient Greek: Βράγχος, romanized: Brankhos, from βρόγχος meaning windpipe) was the son of Smicrus and a lover of the god Apollo in Greek mythology. Initially a shepherd in Miletus, Branchus became a prophet after receiving prophetic abilities from Apollo. He introduced the worship of the god at Didyma and founded a shrine for him at Miletus. His descendants, the Branchides, were an influential clan of prophets.

== Mythology ==
=== Birth ===
Branchus was the son of Smicrus and a distinguished Milesian woman. When giving birth, his mother had a vision of the sun entering her mouth, passing through her stomach and emerging from her genitals. (Note: Apollo's cult in Didyma and other Anatolian cities was where his solar aspect was the strongest; in Didyma he had the epithets Helios and Phasimbrotos among others.) The seers took this to be an excellent omen, and so her son was named Branchus, since the sun had passed through her bronchia (throat).

=== Encounter with Apollo ===
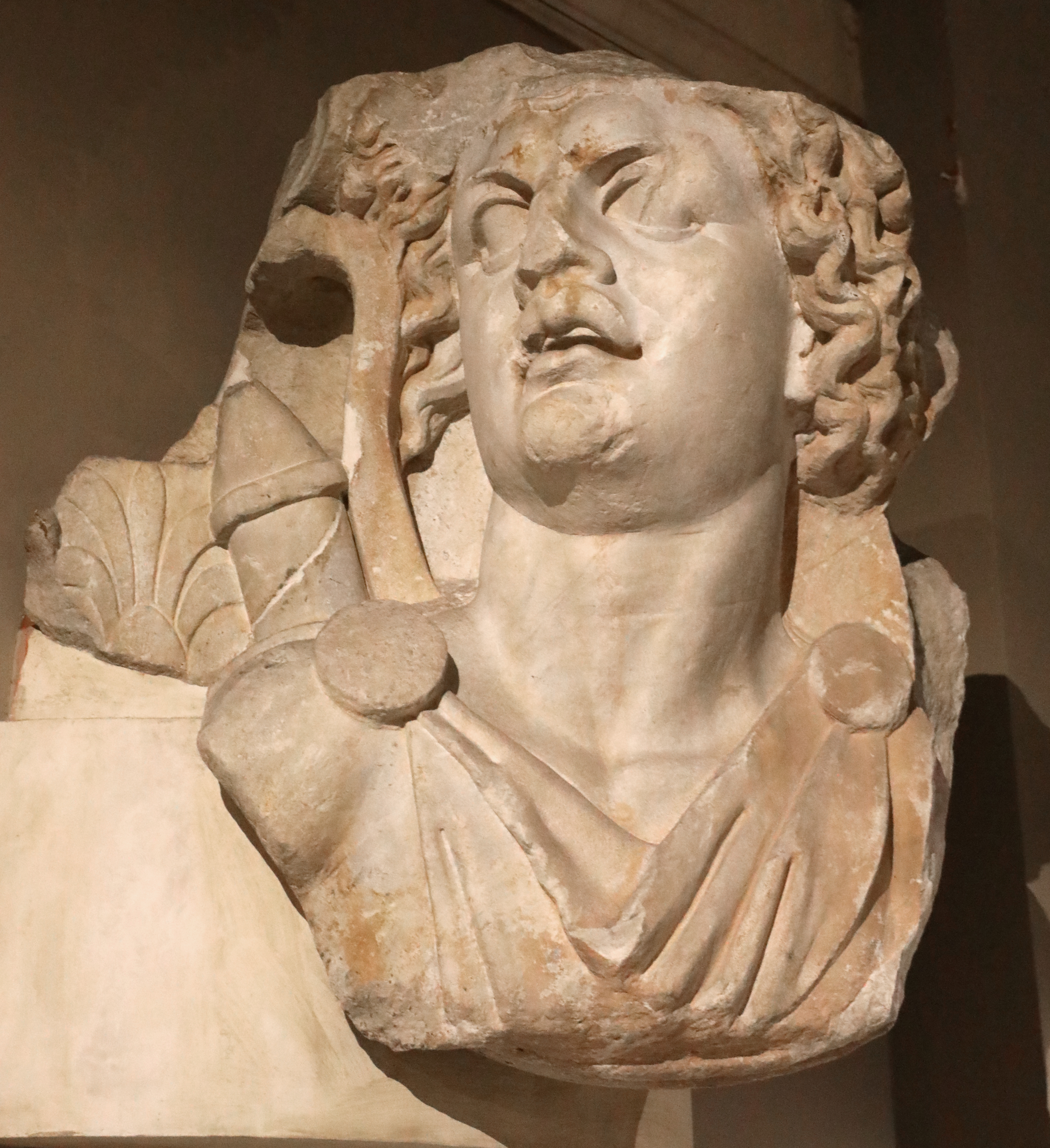
A Hellenistic bust-relief of Apollo from Didyma in the Istanbul Archaeology Museums.

Branchus grew up to be the most handsome of men. One day, he came across Apollo in the woods and, being enchanted with the beauty of the god, kissed him. Apollo embraced him and returned his affections. Later Apollo gave him a crown and a magical staff, and breathed the gift of prophecy into him. Having received these gifts, Branchus became a prophet and a priest of Apollo. He established the cult of Apollo at Didyma. After Branchus suddenly disappeared, an altar was built on the place he kissed Apollo.

A different story is given by Callimachus. One day, Apollo left Delos on a dolphin and reached a place called hiera hyle (sacred woods). It was there that he saw Branchus tending to his flocks and felt attracted to him. Wanting to seduce the mortal, Apollo appeared to him disguised as a goatherd. He first offered assistance in milking the goats, but the distracted god ended up milking a billy goat. Embarrassed, Apollo revealed his divine nature. In order to persuade Branchus to abandon the herding and accompany him instead, Apollo guaranteed the safety and promised a supply of good grazing to the flocks. After they became lovers, Apollo taught Branchus the mantic arts. Apollo also looked after the flocks while Branchus practiced the art. On becoming a prophet, Branchus is said to have transplanted a shoot of the laurel tree at Delphi in the precinct of Didyma. Branchus used the branches of this laurel tree while chanting spells in order to cure the illness of the Milesians.

== Cult ==
Milesians built temples dedicated to Branchus and Apollo and named them Philesia, after the kiss of Branchus. There, the god was worshipped under the name Apollo Philesius (Apollo of the kiss). Temples dedicated to Branchus alone were called Branchiadon. The oracles given by him were said to be second only to Apollo's oracles at Delphi. The Branchides, who claimed descent from Branchus, were an important clan of prophets.

== See also ==
Other male lovers of Apollo:

- Cyparissus
- Hyacinthus
- Admetus of Pherae

== Bibliography ==
- Avery, Catherine B. (1962). New Century Classical Handbook. New York: Appleton-Century-Crofts.
- Callimachus, Aetia. Iambi. Lyric Poems. Edited and translated by Dee L. Clayman. Loeb Classical Library 421. Cambridge, MA: Harvard University Press, 2022. Available online at Loeb Classical Library.
- Conon, Fifty Narrations, surviving as one-paragraph summaries in the Bibliotheca (Library) of Photius, Patriarch of Constantinople translated from the Greek by Brady Kiesling. Online version at the Topos Text Project.
- Fontenrose, Joseph Eddy (1988). Didyma: Apollo's Oracle, Cult, and Companions. University of California Press. ISBN 0-520-05845-3.
- Grimal, Pierre (1987). The Dictionary of Classical Mythology. Wiley-Blackwell. ISBN 0-631-13209-0.
- Lelli, Emanuele (2011). "Proverbs and Popular Sayings in Callimachus". In Acosta-Hughes, Benjamin; Lehnus, Luigi; Stephens, Susan (eds.). Brill's Companion to Callimachus. Leiden. ISBN 9789004156739.
