= Sacred Way (disambiguation) =

Sacred Way typically refers to

- Sacred Way, the ancient road from Athens to Eleusis

Sacred way typically refers to

- Sacred way (shendao), the ornate road leading to a Chinese tomb of a major dignitary

Sacred Way or ways may also refer to:

- Sacred Way, the ancient road connecting the monumental sites at Delphi
- Sacred Way, the ancient road connecting the city of Samos to the Heraion of Samos
- Sacred Way, an ancient road connecting the Sanctuary of Didyma to the city
- Sacred Way, the road leading to the asclepium of ancient Pergamon
- Sacred Way (Via Sacra), the road leading to the Capitoline Hill of ancient Rome
- Sacred Way (Shendao), the sacred way connecting Ming Xiaoling to Nanjing
- Sacred Way (Voie Sacrée), a road that connects Bar-le-Duc to Verdun, France
