= Sacra =

Sacra may refer to:

- Bibliotheca Sacra, the theological journal published by Dallas Theological Seminary
- Harmonia Sacra, a Mennonite shape note hymn and tune book
- Isola Sacra, an island in the Lazio region of Italy south of Rome
- Nomina sacra, the tradition of abbreviated writing of titles in early Greek language Holy Scripture
- Sacra (ancient Rome), transactions related to the worship of the gods
- Sacra conversazione, a depiction of the Madonna with infant Jesus amidst a group of saints
- Sacra Corona Unita, a Mafia-like criminal organization from Apulia
- Sacra di San Michele, a religious complex on Mount Pirchiriano
- Sacra jam splendent, the opening words of the Roman Catholic hymn for Matins
- Sacra Music, a Japanese record label owned by Sony Music Labels Inc.
- Via Sacra, the main street of ancient Rome

== See also ==
- Sacrum (disambiguation)
