= Sacrum (disambiguation) =

Sacrum is the neuter form of the Latin adjective sacer, meaning "holy" or "sacred". It is a large, triangular bone at the base of the spine and at the upper and back part of the pelvic cavity.

Sacrum may also refer to:

- Canticum Sacrum ad Honorem Sancti Marci Nominis, a 17-minute choral-orchestral piece composed in 1955 by Igor Stravinsky
- "O sacrum convivium", a Latin prose text honoring the Blessed Sacrament
- Annum sacrum, an encyclical by Pope Leo XIII

== See also ==
- Sacer (disambiguation)
- Sacra (disambiguation)
