= Sacer =

Sacer is Latin for "sacred".

Sacer may also refer to:

== Latin terms ==
- Homo sacer, an obscure figure of Roman law who is banned.
- Apparatus sacer, an overview of the different interpretations of the Old and New Testament by ecclesiastical authors.
- Mons Sacer, a hill outside Rome, Italy
- Scarabeus Sacer, the scientific name for the Dung Beetle

== People with the surname Sacer ==
- Gottfried Wilhelm Sacer (1635–1699), German poet, satirist and Protestant hymn writer
- Mario Sačer (born 1990), a Croatian international football forward

== Other uses ==
- Société Anonyme pour la Construction et l'Entretien des Routes (SACER), a French road construction group

== See also ==
- Sacrum (disambiguation)
