= Smicrus =

Scientific classification
- Kingdom: Animalia
- Phylum: Arthropoda
- Class: Insecta
- Order: Coleoptera
- Suborder: Polyphaga
- Infraorder: Staphyliniformia
- Family: Ptiliidae
- Genus: Smicrus; Matthews, 1872

Genus of beetles

Smicrus is a genus of beetles belonging to the family Ptiliidae.

The species of this genus are found in Europe and America.

Species:

- Smicrus americanus Casey, 1886
- Smicrus aubaei (Matthews, 1872)
