= Paeonius of Ephesus =

Ancient Greek architect

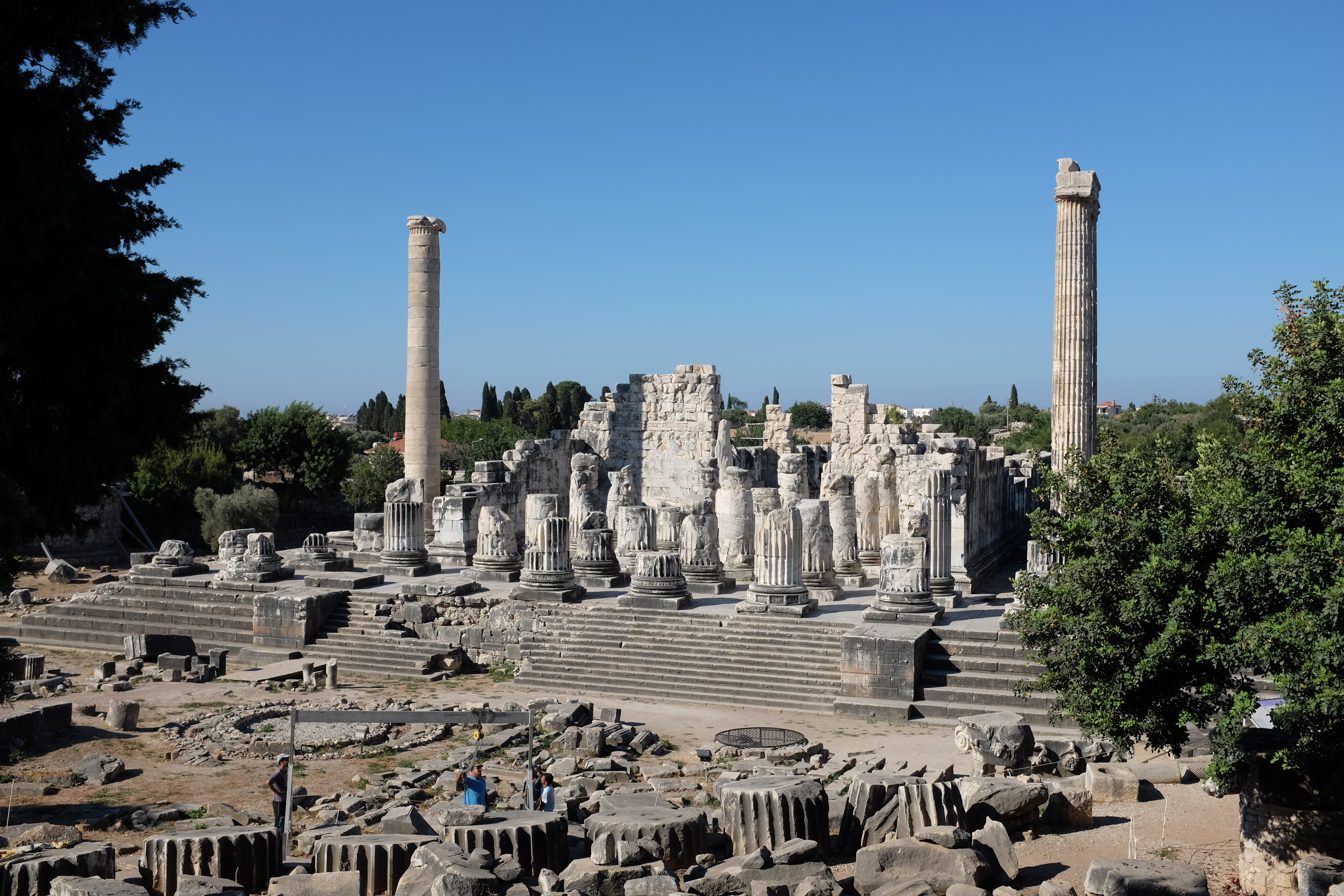
Ruins of Paeonius's temple of Apollo at Didyma

Paeonius of Ephesus (/piːˈoʊniəs/ Ancient Greek: Παιώνιος Paiṓnios) (fl. c. 420 to 380 BCE) was an ancient Greek architect, one of the builders of the temple of Artemis at Ephesus.

In conjunction with Demetrius, he completed the great temple at Ephesus, which Chersiphron had begun. With Daphnis of Miletus, he began to build at Miletus a temple of Apollo, of the Ionic order. The ruins of this famous Didymaeum, or temple of Apollo Didymus, are still to be seen at Didyma near Miletus. The temple, in which the Branchidae had an oracle of Apollo (from which the place itself obtained the name of Branchidae), was burnt at the capture of Miletus by the army of Darius in 498 BCE. The new temple, which was on a scale only inferior to that of Artemis, was never finished. It was dipteral, decastyle and hypaethral. Among its extensive ruins, two columns are still standing.
