= Didyma =

Archaeological site in the Aegean Region

- Δίδυμα (Ancient Greek)
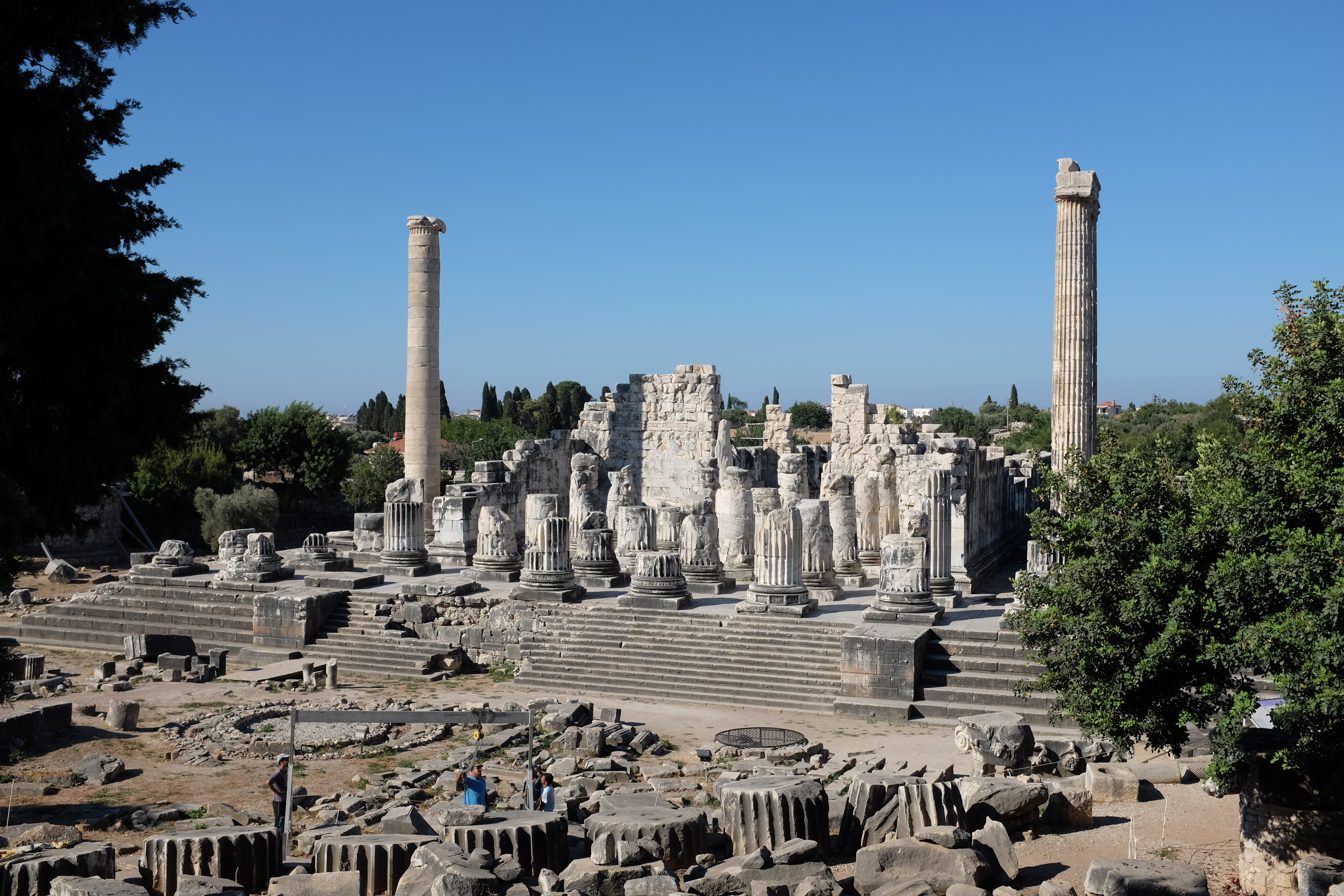
- The ruins of the Temple of Apollo at Didyma

- Location within Turkey
- 37°23′06″N 27°15′23″E
- Type: Sanctuary
- Cultures: Greek, Roman
- Satellite of: Miletus
- Location: Didim, Aydın Province, Turkey
- Region: Aegean Region

History
- Built: 8th century B.C.E.
- Abandoned: C.E. 1493

Site notes
- Condition: Ruined
- Owner: Public
- Public access: Yes
- Website: Didim Archaeological Site

Didyma (/ˈdɪdɪmə/; Ancient Greek: Δίδυμα) was an ancient Greek sanctuary on the coast of Ionia in the domain of the famous city of Miletus. Apollo was the main deity of the sanctuary (also called the Didymaion), and it included temples to both Apollo and his twin sister, Artemis; other deities were also honoured there. Didyma was known in antiquity for its famed oracle of Apollo, situated within the god's temple. The remains of this Hellenistic temple are among the best-preserved from classical antiquity. Other buildings from the sanctuary included a Greek theatre and the Hellenistic temple of Artemis.

== Geography ==
Map of the area around ancient Didyma

The ruins of Didyma are located a short distance to the northwest of modern Didim in Aydın Province, Turkey, whose name is derived from the ruins. It sits on a headland that in antiquity formed the Milesian Peninsula. Didyma was the largest and most significant sanctuary on the territory of the great classical city Miletus. The natural connection between Miletus and Didyma was by way of ship. But during antiquity the sediments from the Meander River silted up the harbour of Miletus. A slow process which eventually meant that the nearby Latmian Gulf developed from a bay into a lake (today Bafa Gölü).

The linear distance between Miletus and Didyma measures some 16 km. As well as the simple footway there also existed a Sacred Way between the city and its sanctuary which measured some 20 km in distance. This Sacred Way, built in the 6th century BC, was used for festival processions. It touched the harbour of Didyma, situated 3 km northwest of the sanctuary called Panormos (today Mavişehir). Along this route were ritual waystations, and statues of noblemen and noblewomen, as well as animal and mythological beast figures. Some of these statues, dating to the 6th century BC, are now in the British Museum (Room 13), excavated by the British archaeologist Charles Thomas Newton in the 19th century.

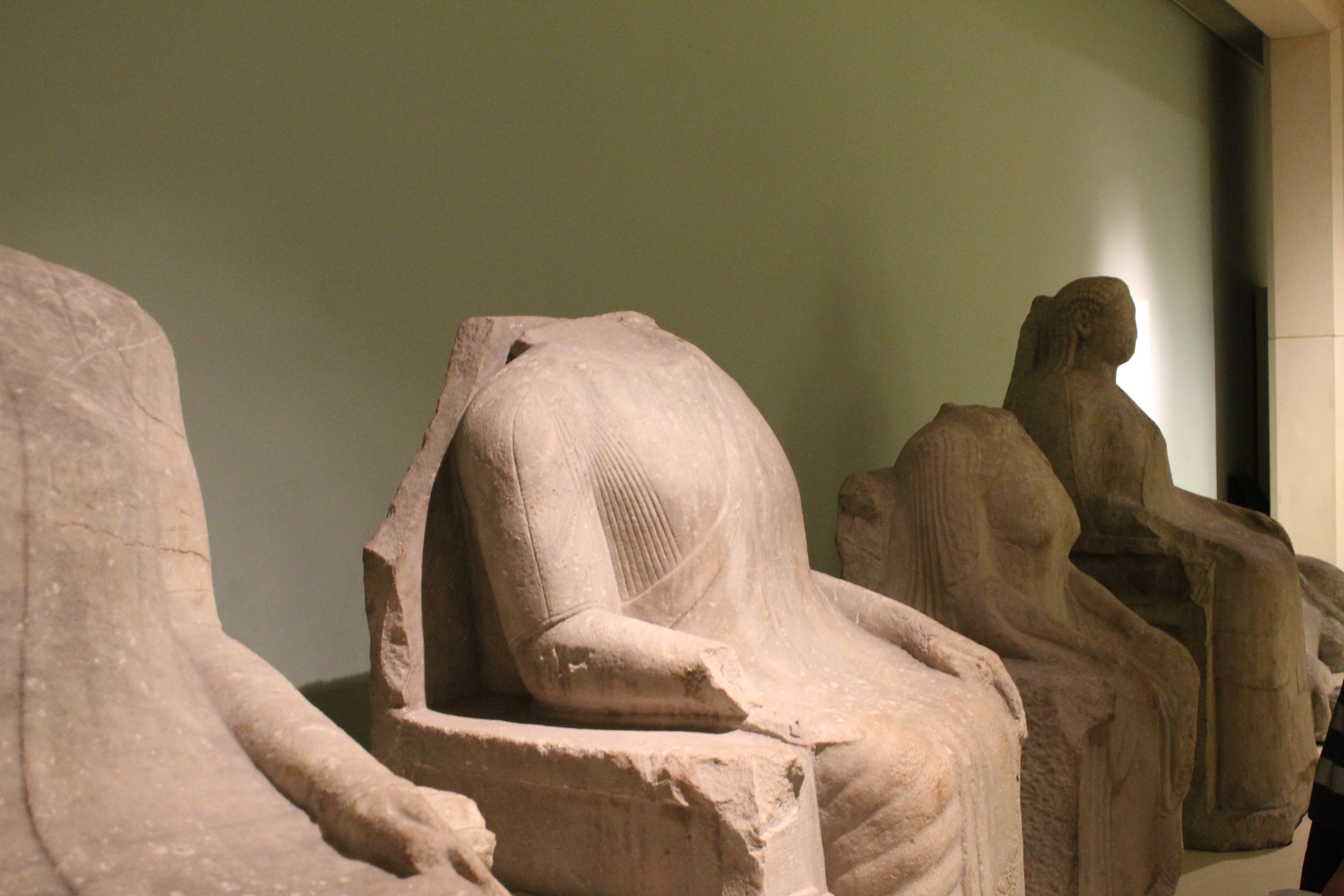
Statues from the sacred way at Didyma in the British Museum

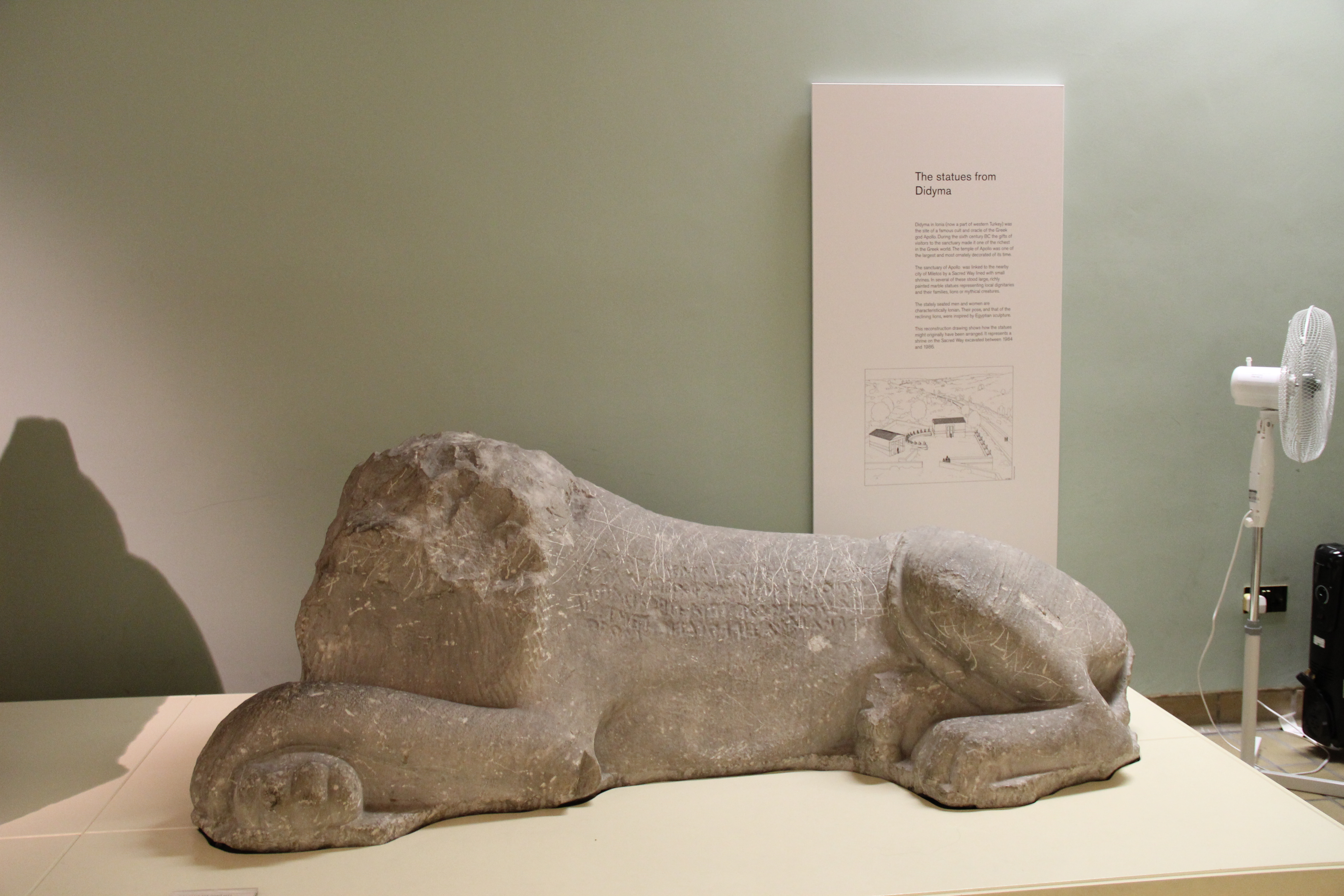
Statue of a recumbent lion from the sacred way at Didyma in the British Museum

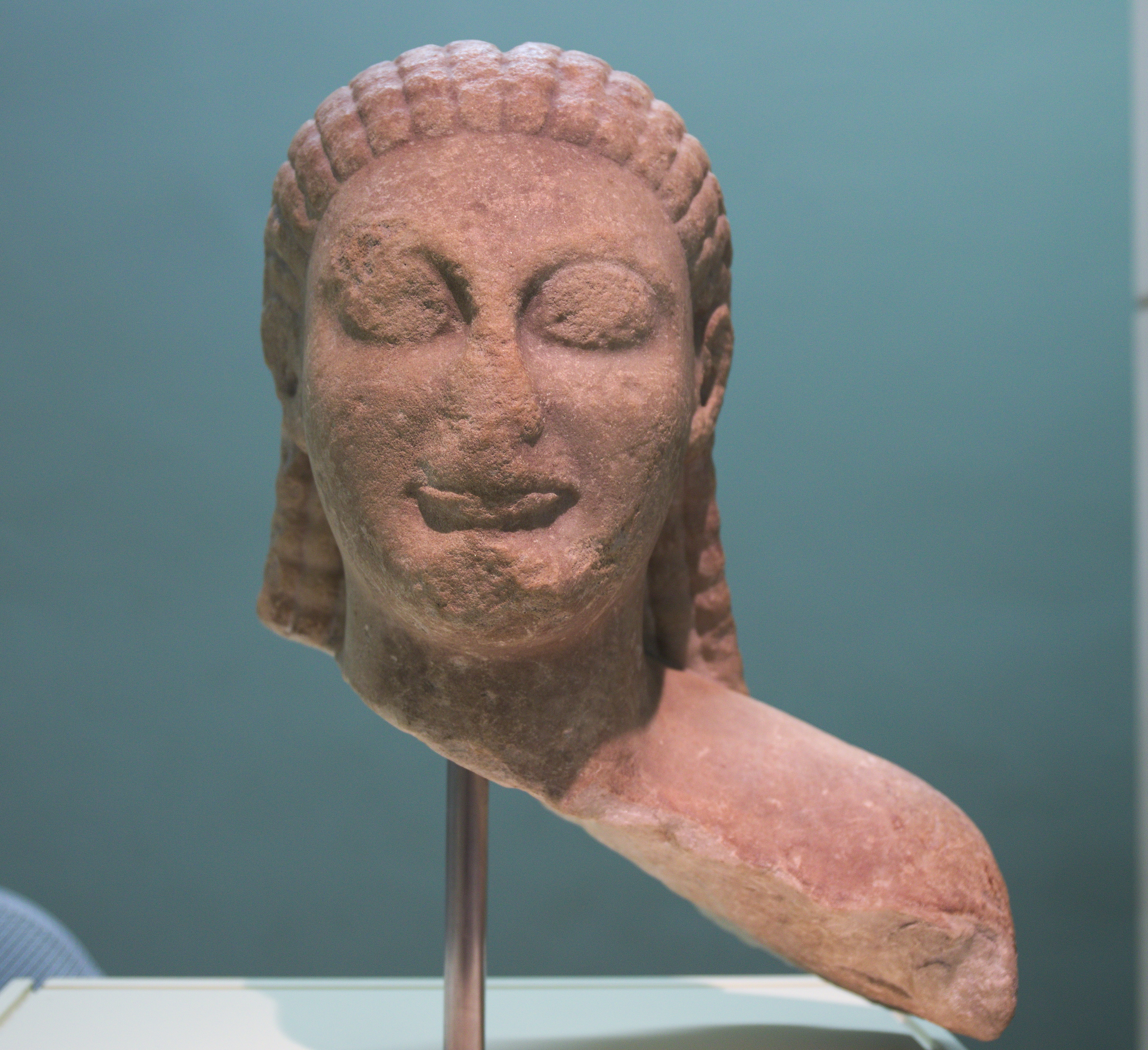
Bust of a marble kouros from the Sacred Way at Didyma, now in the British Museum, 550 BC

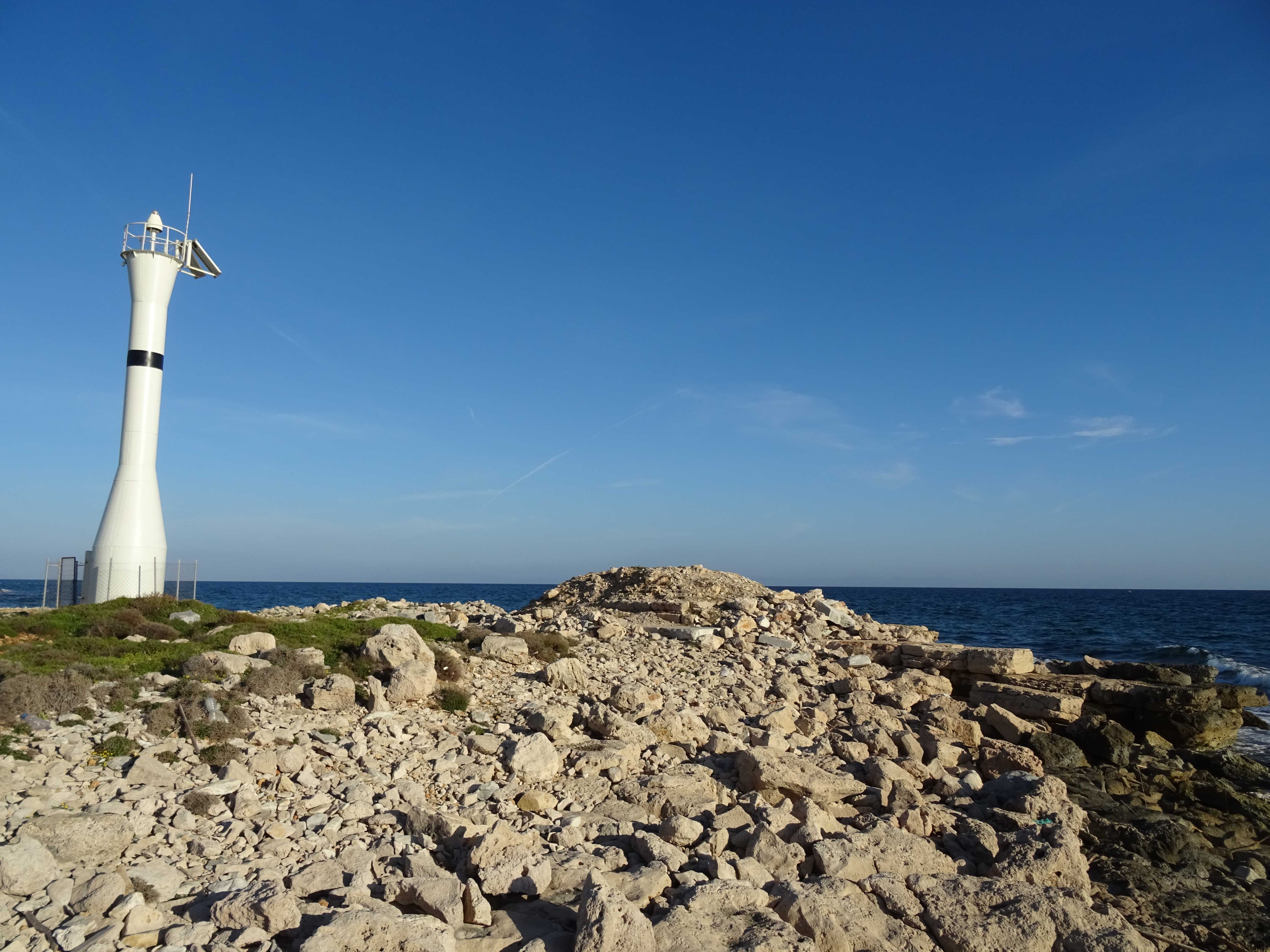
The lighthouse and the remains of the altar of Poseidon

The Milesians erected an altar dedicated to Poseidon 6 km southwest of Didyma. The altar was built in the first half of the 6th century BC at the southwest cape of the Milesian Peninsula. Here was the border between Ionia and Caria (according to Strabo). The remains of the altar are still visible and can be easily found due to the location of a nearby modern lighthouse. Architectural members of this famous altar can be seen in the Pergamon Museum of Berlin.

== Names ==
In Greek didyma means "twins", but some suggest that it has Carian origin of the name. The Carians settled this area first and then Ionian Greeks settled in Didyma around 1000 BC. Didyma was first mentioned among the Greeks in the Homeric Hymn to Apollo. But its establishment is supposed to precede literacy and even the Hellenic colonization of Ionia around 1000 BC. In contrary the first archaeological pieces of evidence of Didyma date in the 8th century BC.

Mythic genealogies of the origins of the Branchidae line of priests, designed to capture the origins of Didyma as a Hellenic tradition, date to the Hellenistic period. Greek and Roman authors laboured to refer the name Didyma to "twin" temples or to temples of the twins Apollo and Artemis, whose own cult center at Didyma had then only recently been established. Also, as Wilamowitz suggested, there may be a connection to Cybele Dindymene, the "Cybele of Mount Dindymon". Excavations by German archaeologists have lately uncovered the temple dedicated to Artemis, north of the temple of Apollo.

Apollo was worshipped in nearby Miletus under the name Delphinius (the same name was also used at Delphi). At Didyma, he was worshipped as Didymeus (Διδυμεύς). His other names in the area were Philesios (Φιλήσιος), Helios, and Carinus (Καρῖνος).

== History ==
A map of the main sanctuaries in Classical Greece

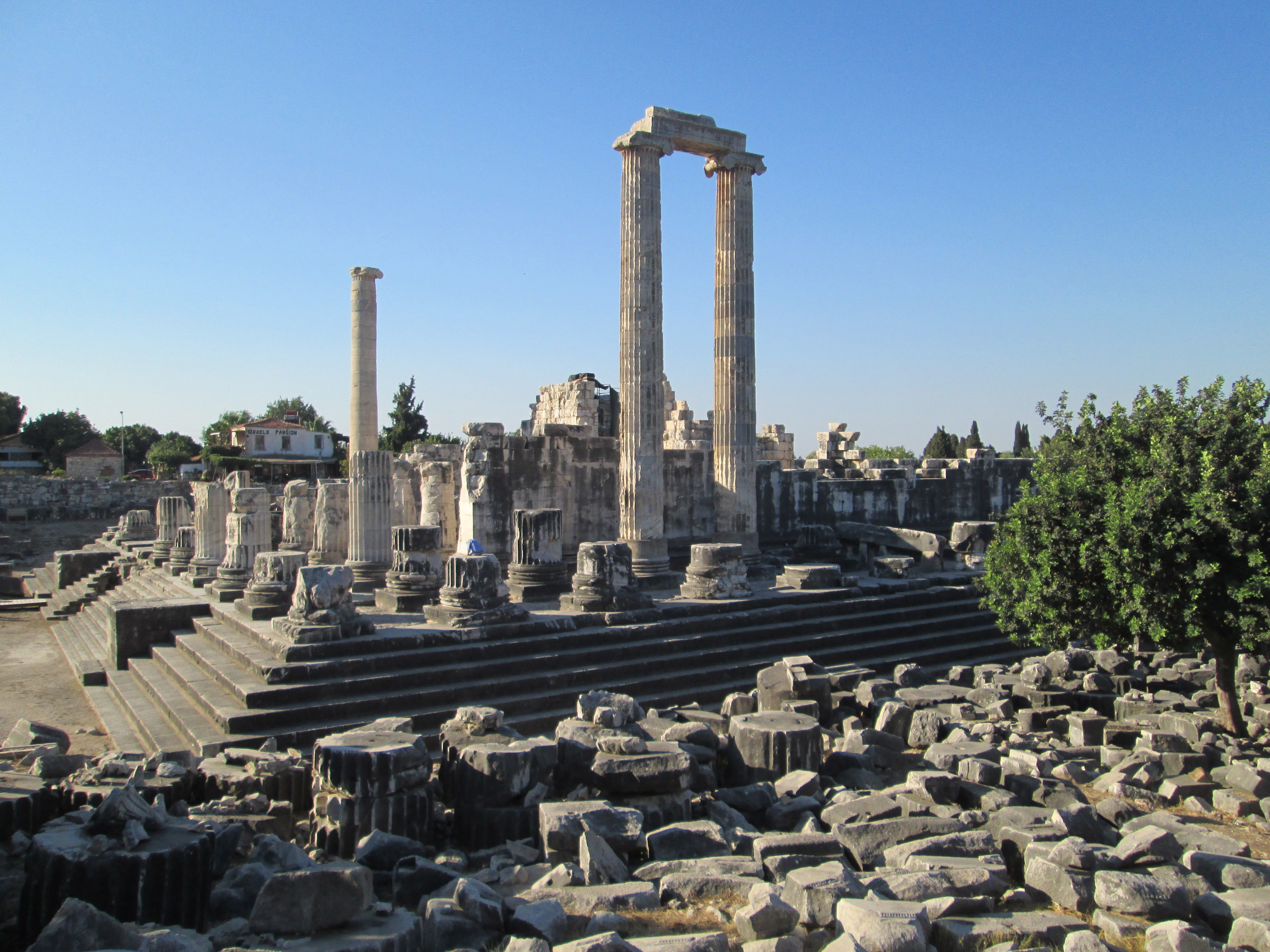
The temple of Apollo southwards.

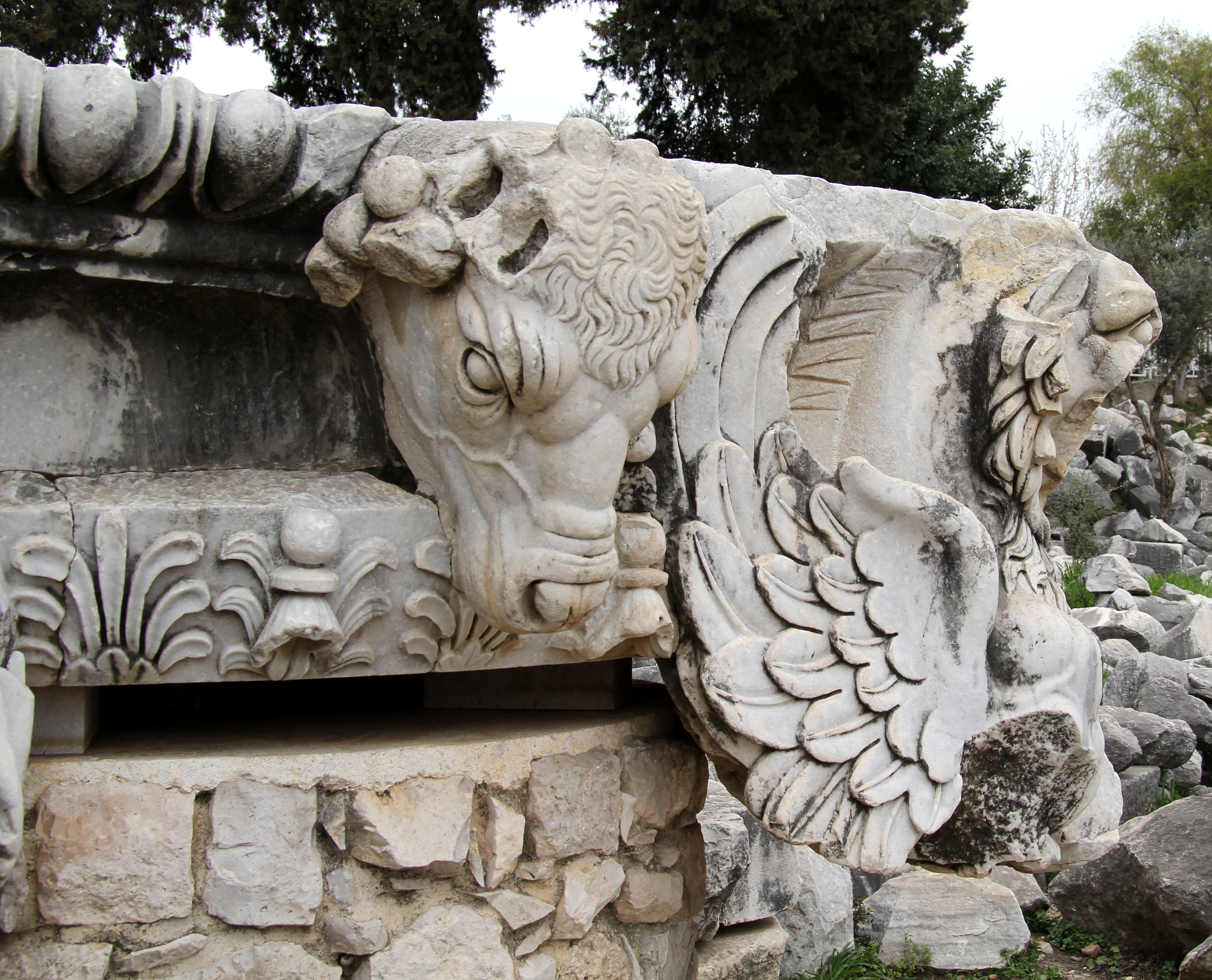
A bull figure from the site.

Both Herodotus and Pausanias dated the origins of the oracle at Didyma before the Ionian colonization of this coast. However, finds from this period are so scarce that the existence of the sanctuary cannot be archaeologically proven for the time before the late 8th or early 7th century BC.

It is supposed that until its destruction by the Persians in 494 BC, Didyma's sanctuary was administered by the family of the Branchidae, who claimed descent from an eponymous Branchus, son of Smicrus and beloved of Apollo. The priestess, seated above the sacred spring, gave utterances that were interpreted by the Branchidae. Clement of Alexandria quotes Leandrios saying that Cleochus, grandfather of the eponymous founder Miletus, was buried within the temple enclosure of Didyma.

Under the Persian king Darius, following the naval battle of Lade, the sanctuary was burned in 494 BC. The Persians carried away the bronze cult statue of Apollo to Ecbatana, traditionally attributed to Canachus of Sicyon at the end in the 6th century BC. It was then reported that the oracle spring ceased to flow and the archaic oracle was silenced. Although the sanctuaries of Delphi and Ephesus were swiftly rebuilt, Didyma remained a ruin until the time Alexander the Great conquered Miletus and freed it from the Persians in 334 BC. In between a complete break had been rent in the oracles' personnel and tradition, the Branchidae priests marched off to Persian sovereign territory. Callisthenes, a court historian of Alexander, reported that the spring began once more to flow as Alexander passed through Egypt in 331 BC.

After the liberation from the Persians the Milesians began to build a new temple for Apollo, which was the largest in the Hellenic world after the temple of Hera on the Isle of Samos and the temple of Artemis at Ephesus. Vitruvius recorded a tradition that the architects were Paeonius of Ephesus, whom Vitruvius credited with the rebuilding of the Temple of Artemis there, and Daphnis of Miletus. The dipteral temple of Apollo was surrounded by a double file of Ionic columns. From the pronaos lead two tunnels to the inner court. This was the location of the oracle spring, the sacred laurel tree and the naiskos - which was itself a small temple. It contained in its own small cella the bronze cult image of Apollo, brought back by Seleucus I Nicator from Persia about 300 BC.

In the Hellenistic period, beside Alexander, the kings Seleucus I and Seleucus II received oracles. So in the 3rd century BC the sanctuary of Apollo stood under the influence of the Seleucids, offering very rich donations to Apollo. Didyma suffered a serious setback in 277/76 BC, as Galatians looted it, coming from the Balkans to Asia Minor. Pliny reported the worship of Apollo Didymiae, Apollo of Didymus, in Central Asia, transported to Sogdiana by a general of Seleucus I and Antiochus I whose inscribed altars there were still to be seen by Pliny's correspondents. Corroborating inscriptions on amphoras were found by I. R. Pichikyan at Dilbergin. Afterwards the kings of Bithynia made donations to the Didymaion in the 2nd century BC and the Ptolemaic kings of Egypt in the first half of 1st century BC.

The annual festival held in Didyma under the auspices of Miletus were called the Didymeia. They are first mentioned at the beginning 3rd century BC. A hundred years later they were made a Panhellenic (open to all Greeks) and a penteteric festival (they took place every four years). In the first half of the 1st century BC the Didymeia were banned because Miletus had supported Mithridates, in his war against the Romans. Furthermore, the sanctuary of Apollo was looted by pirates in 67 BC. After Pompey had reorganized the East of the Roman Empire, the Didymeia were permitted again in 63 BC. Some years later Julius Caesar expanded the area under asylum in Didyma. Apparently the Roman emperor Caligula tried to complete the huge temple of Apollo. Emperor Trajan renewed the Sacred Way between Miletus and Didyma as inscriptions prove in 101 AD. His successor Hadrian visited Miletus and Didyma in 129 AD and acted as Prophet - the highest office in the sanctuary. Under Commodus the Didymeia were held as the Commodeia for the cult of the emperor.

In Hellenistic and Roman times the sanctuary of Apollo flourished again. Numerous oracles of Apollo were imparted; some of them are extant in Roman inscriptions. These included inquiries and responses, and literary testimony records Didyma's role as an oracle, with the "grim epilogue" of Apollo's supposed sanction of Diocletian's persecution of Christians, until the closing of the temples under Theodosius I. This was the end of the oracle. In Late Antiquity Didyma had been the seat of a bishop. Under Justinian I it was honoured with the title Iustinianopolis. In Byzantine times it changed the name to Hieronda deriving from the Greek name for sanctuary (hieron). This name was used for the village above the temple ruin until the early 20th century (Jeronda) and today the Turks continue to call it Yoran. In the late 13th century, the Turkomans captured Hierononda, although the city was briefly reconquered by the Byzantines during the Meander campaigns of Alexios Philanthropenos.

An earthquake in 1493 destroyed the temple of Apollo and the village was abandoned. About 300 years later the village was resettled by Greeks who used the broken ancient buildings as quarries.

== Modern investigations ==
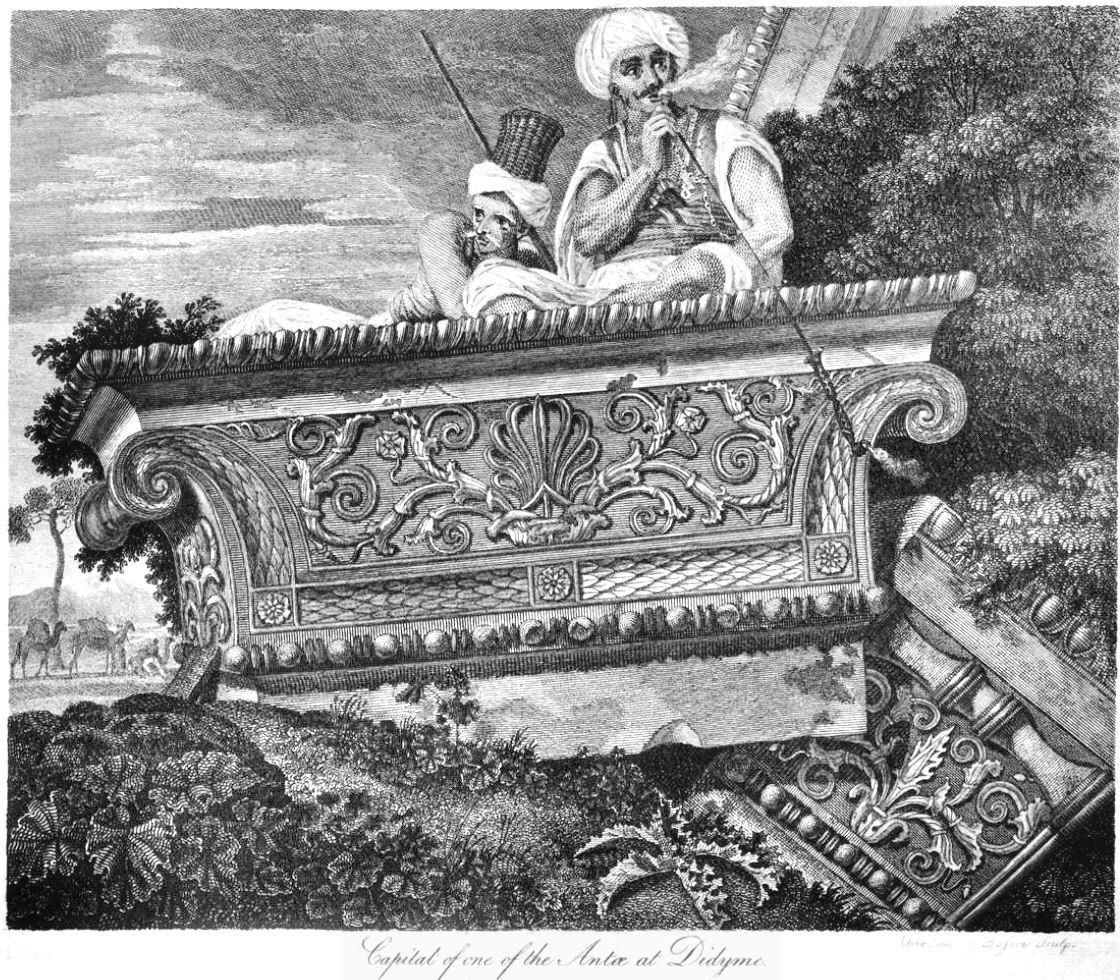
Pilaster capital at the Temple of Apollo in Didyma. 2nd century BC.

When Ciriaco de' Pizzicolli visited the spot in 1446, it seems that the temple was still standing in great part, although the cella had been converted into a fortress by the Byzantines, but when the next European visitor, the Englishmen Jeremy Salter and Dr Pickering, arrived in 1673, it had collapsed. The Society of Dilettanti sent two expeditions to explore the ruins, the first in 1764 under Richard Chandler, the second in 1812 under William Gell. The French "Rothschild Expedition" of 1873 sent a certain amount of architectural sculpture to the Louvre, but no excavation was attempted until Emmanuel Pontremoli and Bernard Haussoullier were sent out by the French Schools of Rome and Athens in 1895. They cleared the eastern façade and partly the northern flank, and discovered inscriptions giving information about other parts.

German excavations made between 1905 and 1913 revealed all of the incomplete Hellenistic temple of Apollo and some carved fragments that belonged to the earlier Archaic temple and to associated statues. After the Second World War the German Archaeological Institute recommenced the investigations at Didyma in 1962. From now on not only the temple of Apollo was explored but the whole area surrounding the temple. In this way some unknown buildings were discovered. The huge district with the Sacred Way north of the temple of Apollo was excavated by Klaus Tuchelt. There he found the supposed sanctuary of Artemis. In 1979 Lothar Haselberger discovered scratched drawings on the walls in the courtyard of the temple of Apollo. A closer examination brought the first ancient blueprint of at least two temples (Apollo and Artemis) back to life. Under Klaus Tuchelt and Peter Schneider the Sacred Way from Miletus was investigated, especially the area outside of the sanctuary of Apollo. They found some of the stations of the procession from Miletus to Didyma.

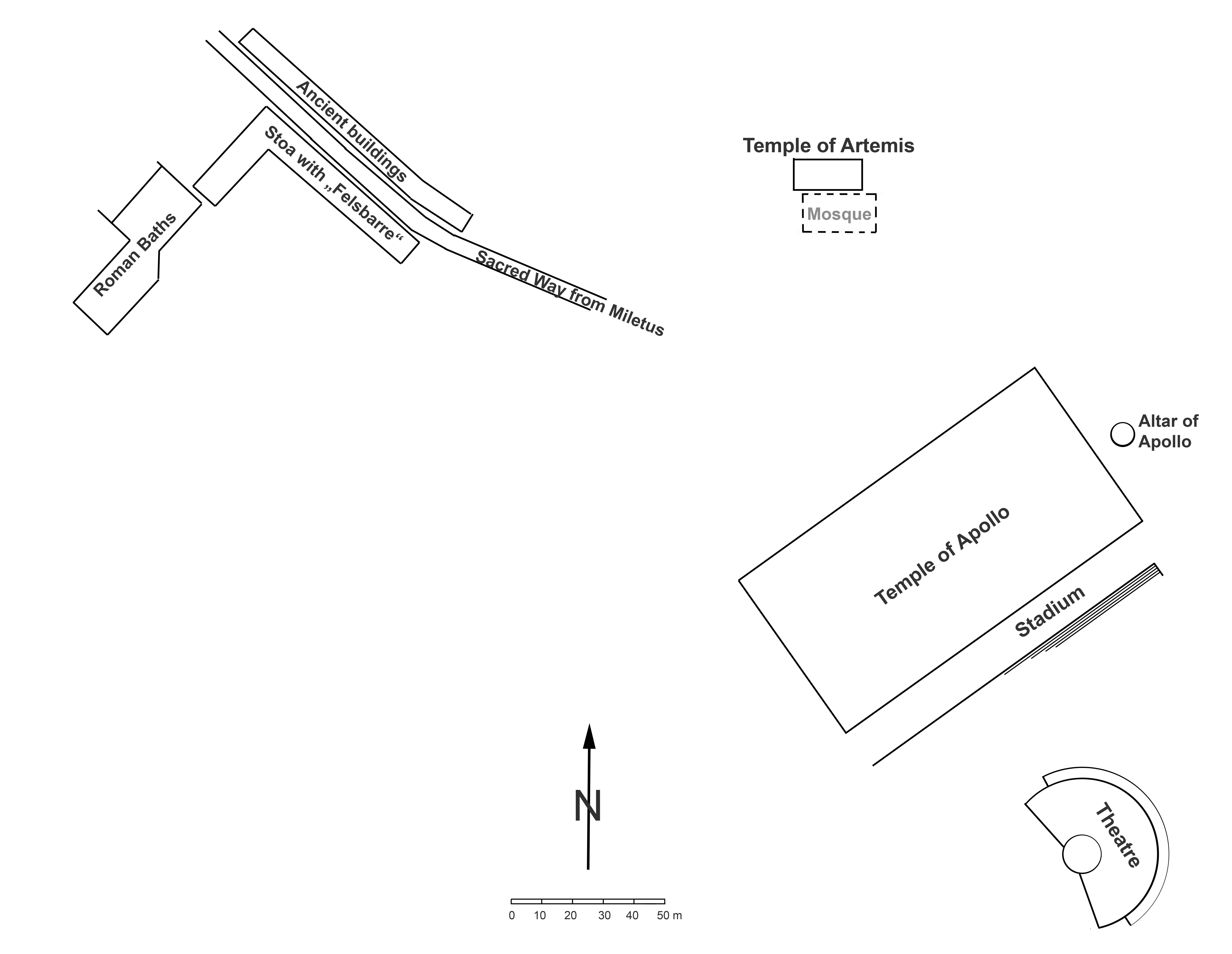
Map of the sanctuary of Apollo at Didyma.

In 2003 Andreas Furtwaengler took over the directorship of the excavation of Didyma. His explorations were concentrated on the Archaic period of the Apollo temple and its close surroundings. Helga Bumke succeeded him 2013. She began in 2001 the exploration of the disposal site (the so-called Taxiarchis hill) of the debris from the Persian looting in 494 BC. Afterwards, also under her auspices, were the discovery of the Greek theatre in 2010/11 and during 2013 the foundations of the temple of Artemis and of another Hellenistic building, residing under a Byzantine chapel.

== Buildings ==
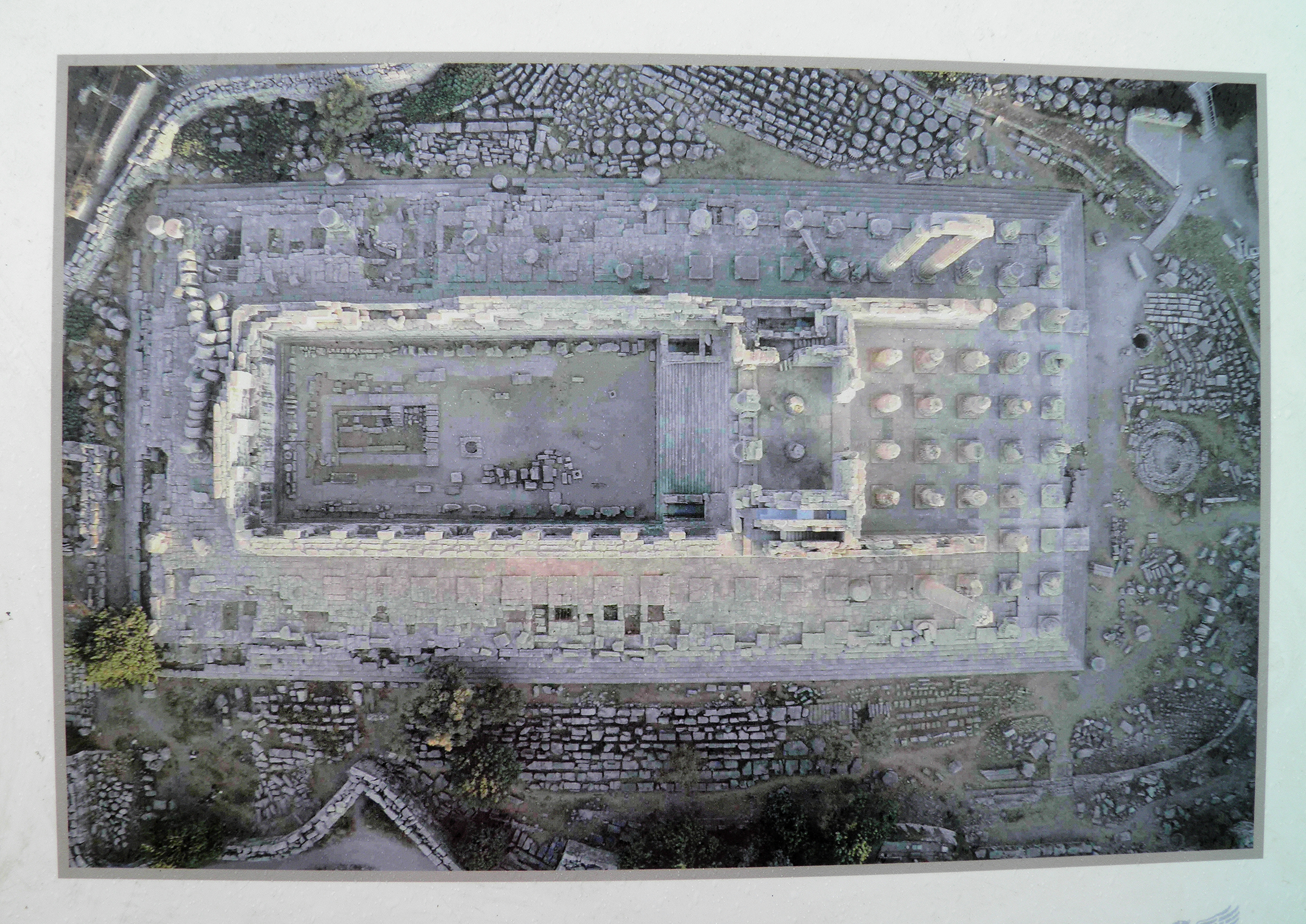
Aerial view of the Temple of Apollo.

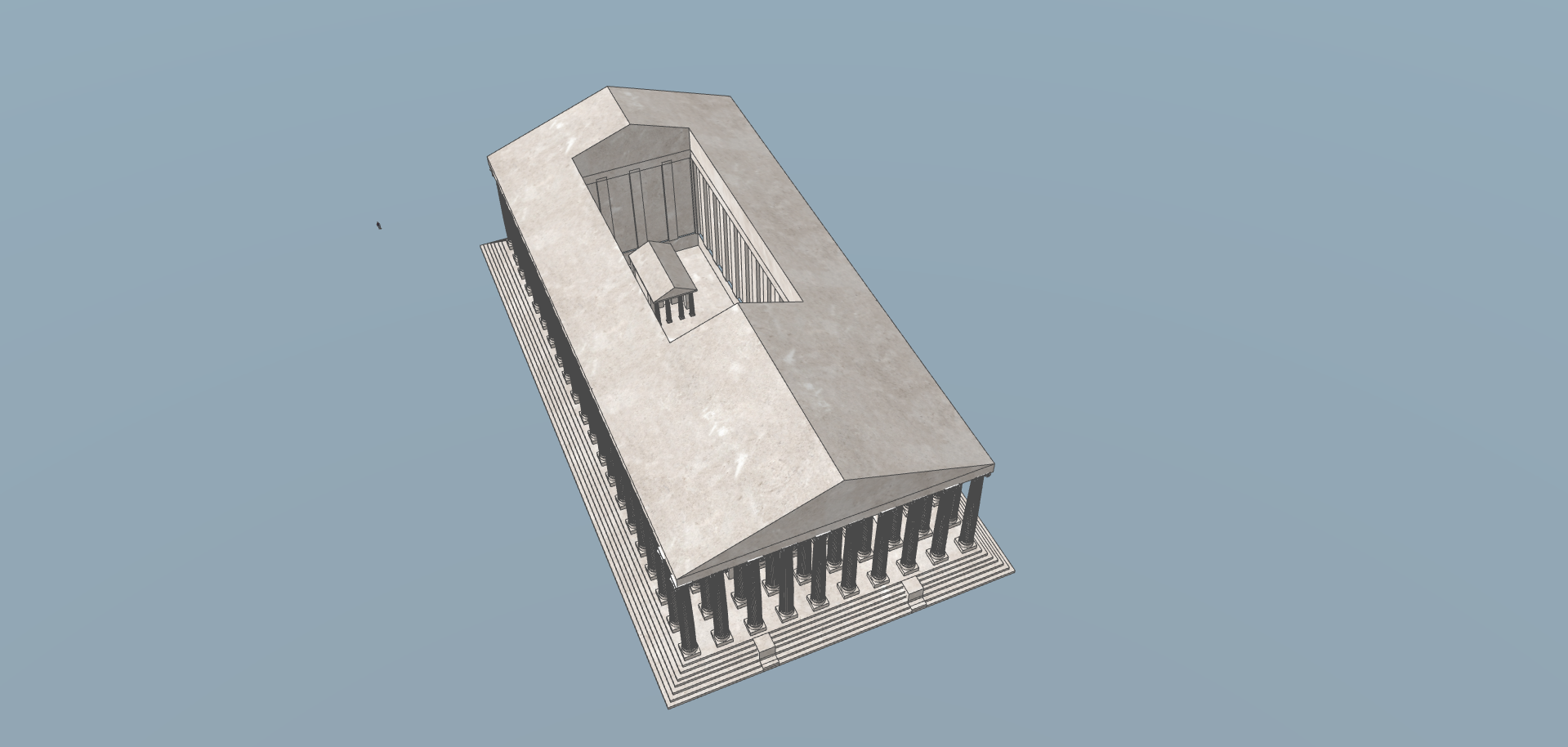
a 3D reconstruction of the temple of Apollo at Didyma

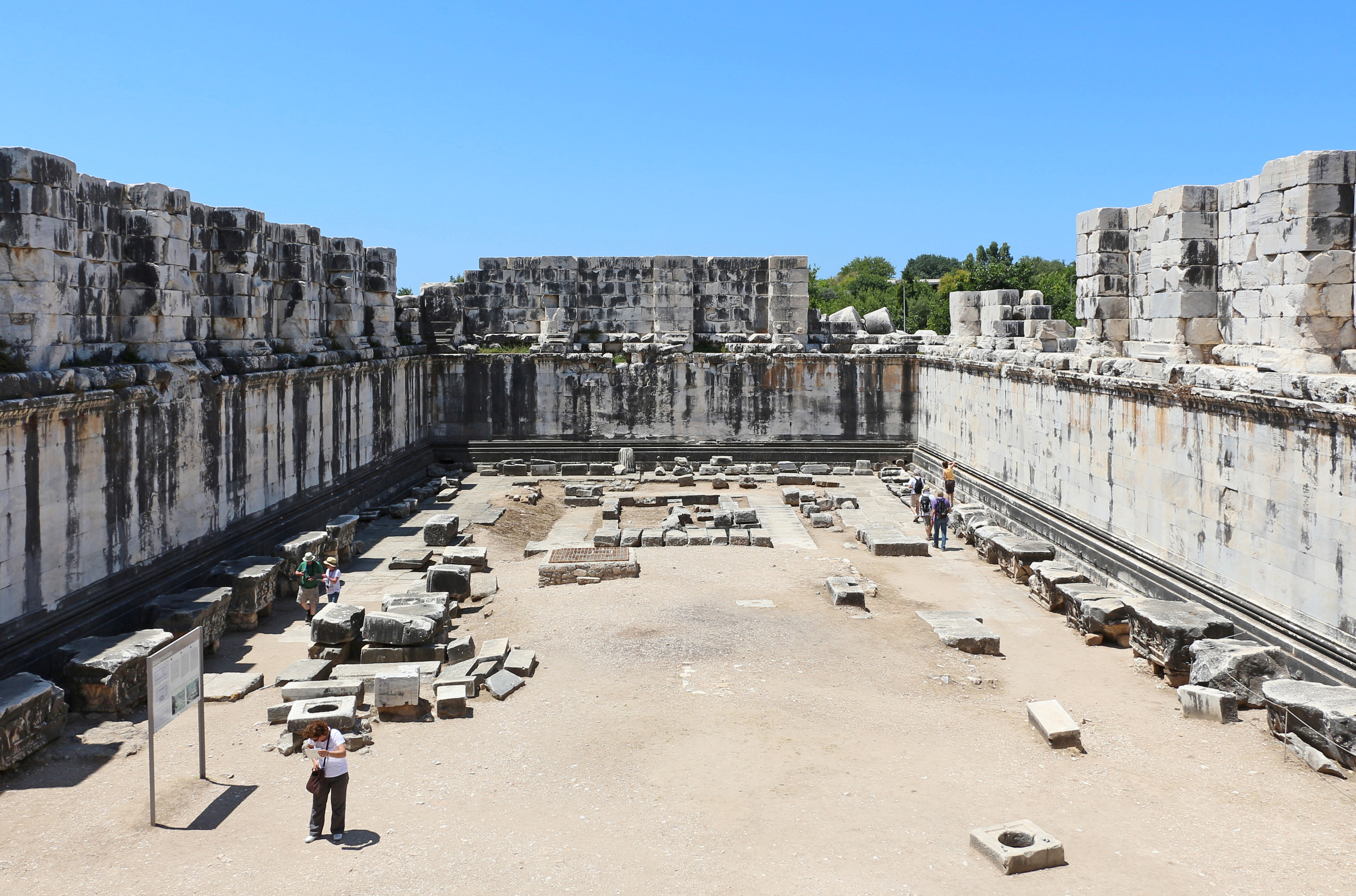
The sekos of the temple of Apollo.

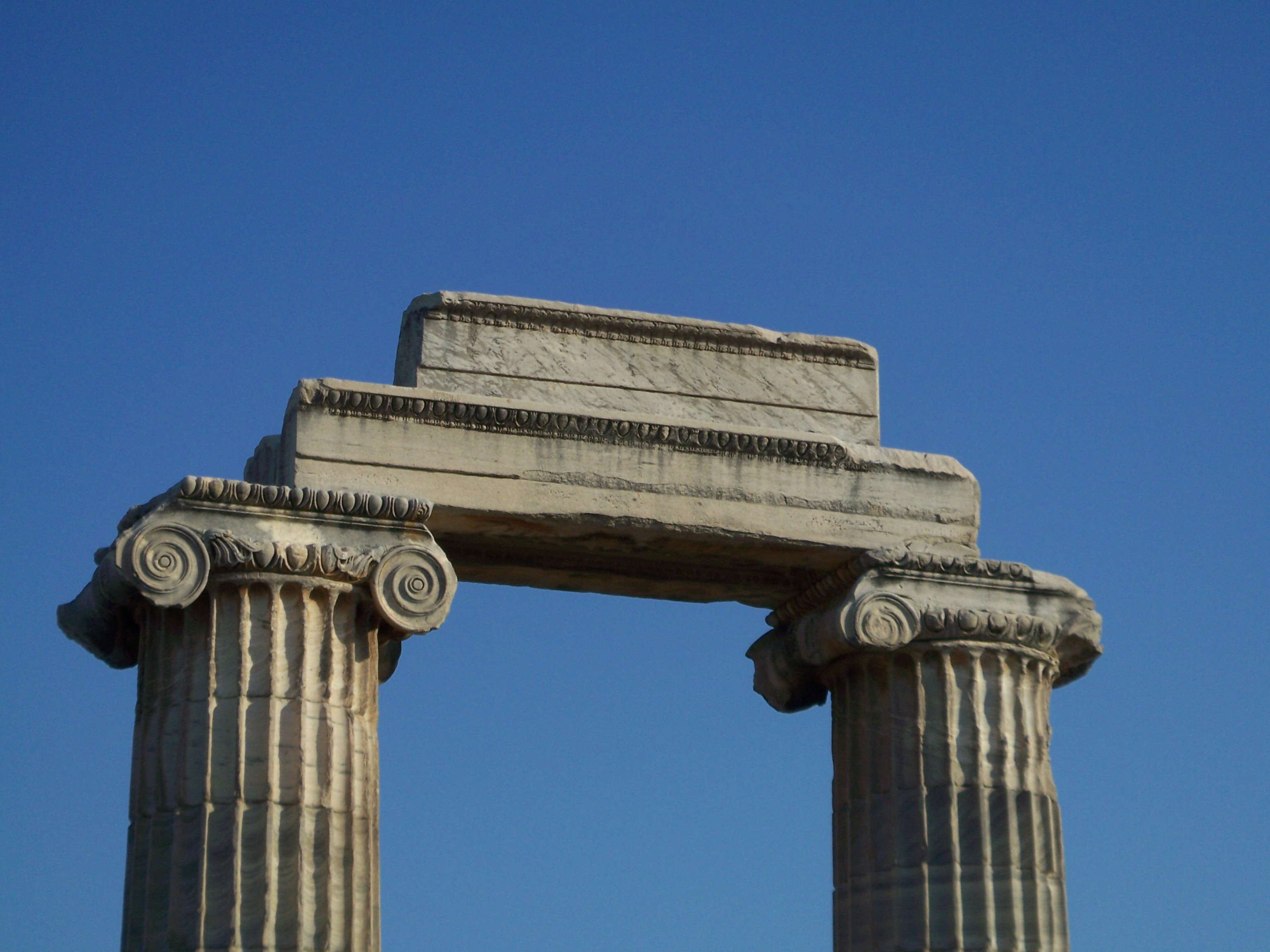
Temple of Apollo: two Ionic columns of the colonnade.

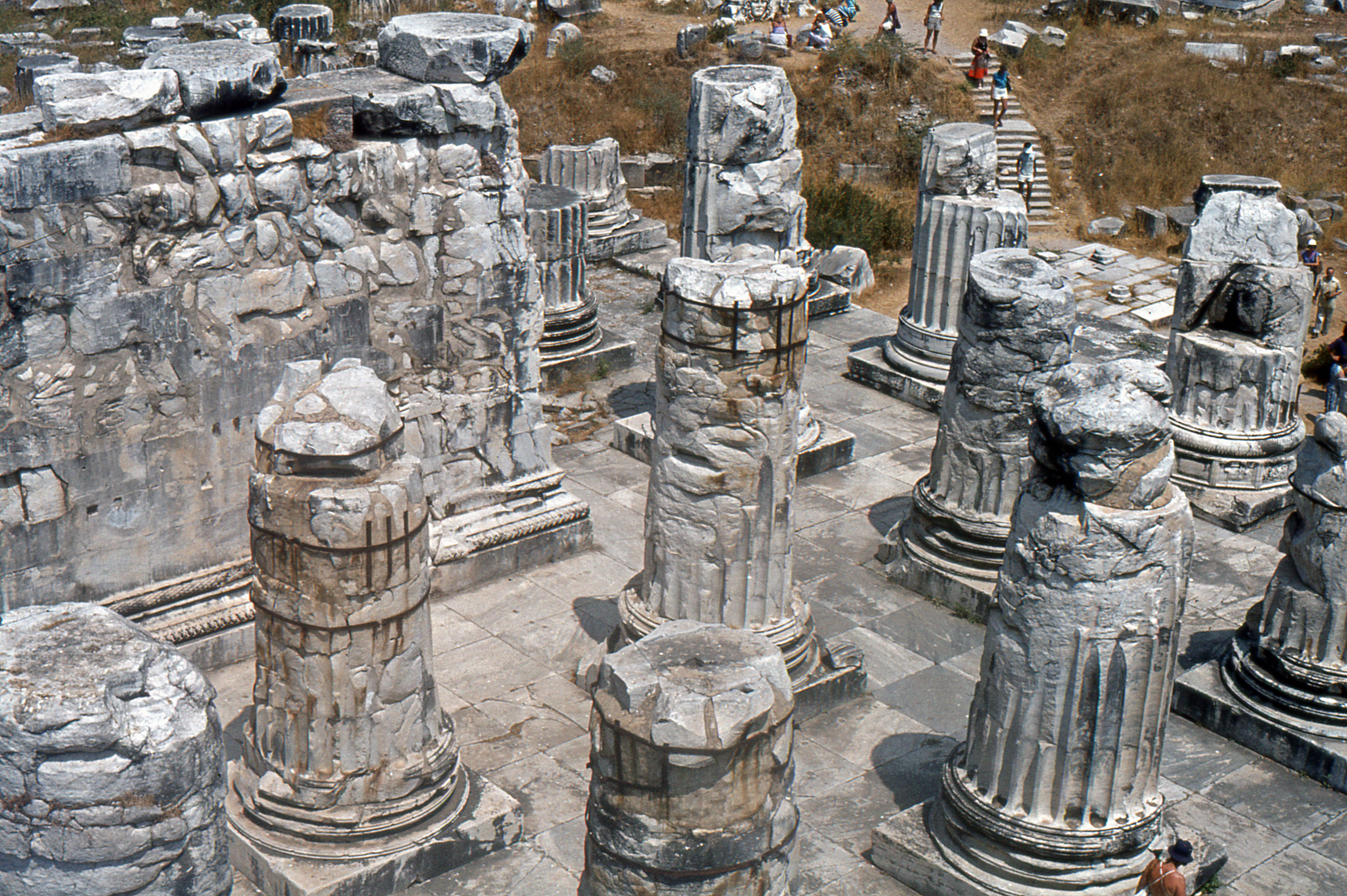
The view of the columns from above.

=== The temple of Apollo ===
The Hellenistic temple had two predecessors. The first sacred building dedicated to Apollo was erected around 700 BC by Ionian Greeks. It was probably a hekatompedos, which means 100 feet long. The width of this first sekos measured 10 meters. 'Sekos' is Greek for ‘courtyard’; we can therefore deduce that the late geometric temple and its successors had never been roofed. The oldest temple of Apollo surrounded the sacred spring and the sacred laurel tree. This spring and tree formed the centre of the sanctuary for more than 1000 years. From the middle of the 6th century BC the Milesians raised a new temple and constructed a new altar for Apollo. Alas, of this temple only the foundations of the sekos wall survived. Though as a lot of late Archaic column fragments were found it was likely a Dipteros, which means the sekos was surrounded by two rows of columns. These Ionic columns were partly ornamented with reliefs like the columns of the temple of Artemis in Ephesus. In the western half of the sekos the remains of a small temple were found, the so-called Naiskos, which housed the cult statue of Apollo. The sacred spring in its original location was already dry by the 6th c. BC and had diverted its position to the eastern half of the sekos. In front of this late Archaic temple was a circular building erected to surround the altar for Apollo, which, according to Pausanias, was made of blood and ashes of the sacrificed animals. This circular building with the conical altar inside was used until the end of antiquity, whilst to the east and south of the temple stood a stoa for storing some of the famous donations of Apollo. The ramifications for the temple after the Ionians lost the naval battle off of the islands of Lade in 494 BC were that most of the buildings of Didyma were heavily damaged by the Persians. The planning for the new Hellenistic temple started after 334 BC. The Milesians resolved to build one of the greatest temples ever made. This goal was not really reached, but they built a temple with a unique plan. The temple of Apollo was clearly planned according to ritual requirements. Though at this present moment, the exact usage and function can only possibly be a matter of conjecture. The temple certainly attained the ambition of being one of the largest ancient temples ever built, its crepidoma with 7 steps measures almost 60 by 120 meters and the stylobate 51 by 109 meters. The temple building itself was surrounded by a double file of Ionic columns, each one of them 19.70 meters high. This consisted of 10 columns along the shorter sides and the 21 columns filling the longer sides, though not all of these were erected even by the end of antiquity. Above the columns followed the architraves with the frieze. The frieze is especially famous as it housed the impressively monumental heads of Medusa.

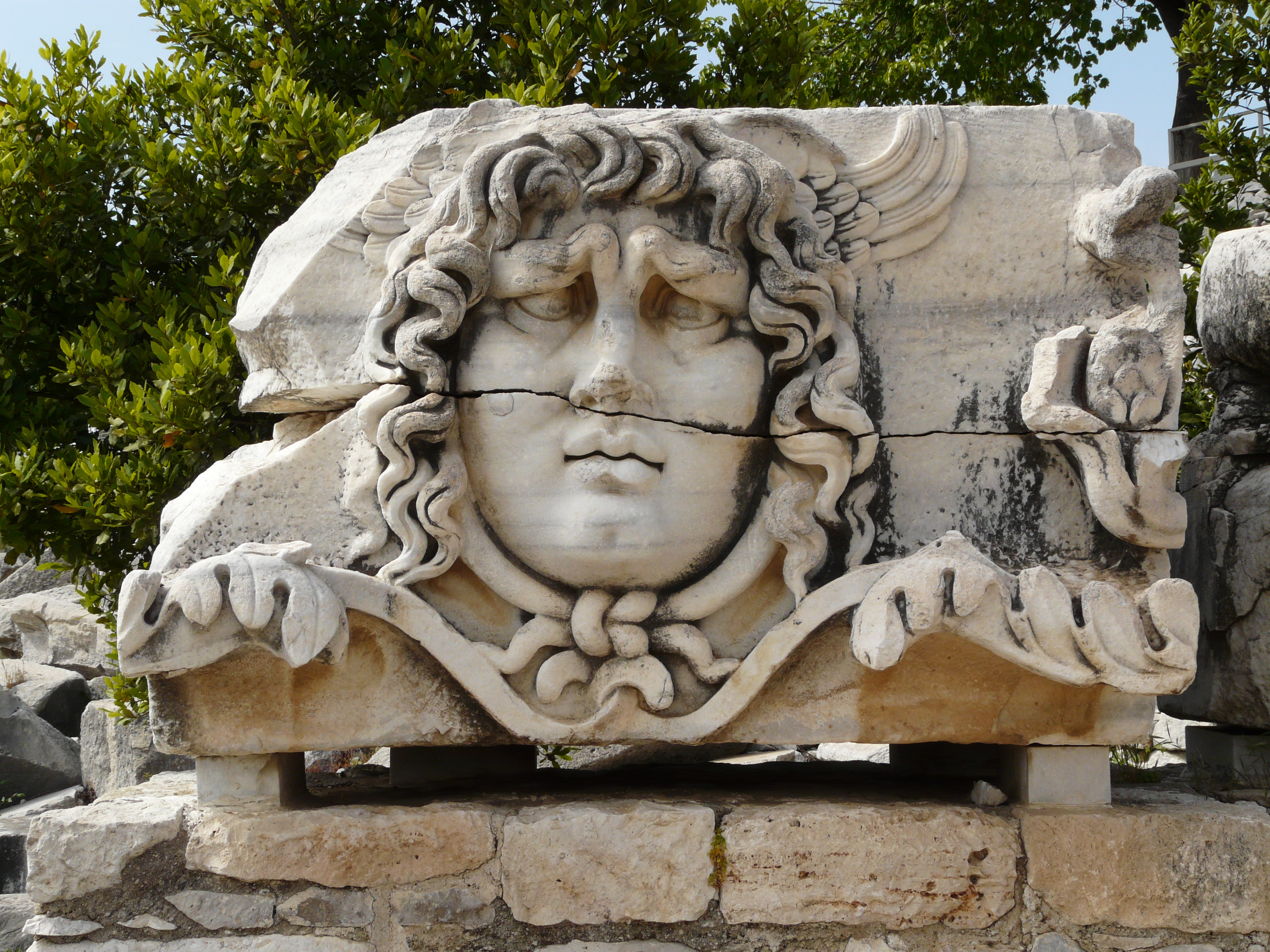
A stone-carved Medusa head

The entrance was at the east side. With a pronaos of three rows of four columns, the approaching visitor passed through a regularized grove formed by the columns. The door usually leading to a cella was replaced by a blank wall with a large upper opening through which one could glimpse the upper part of the naiskos in the inner court (in inscriptions the inner court is referred to as "sekos" or "adyton"). The impassable threshold of this door stands 1.5 meters above the floor of the pronaos, while the entire door reaches a height of 14 meters. The entry route lay down either of two long constricted sloping tunnels built within the thickness of the walls and giving access to the inner court, still open to the sky but isolated from the world by the 25 meters high walls of the sekos. This was the location of the oracle spring, the laurel tree and the naiskos with the cult statue. The foundations of the naiskos are 8.24 meters wide and 14.23 meters long. This Ionic prostylos was built around 300 BC. It is famed because of the superior high quality of its ornamentation. The naiskos with the cult statue of Apollo is depicted on Imperial coins of Miletus. The sacred oracle spring was not situated in the naiskos, but in the eastern half of the sekos. It was found beneath the early Byzantine church. The inner walls of the sekos were articulated by pilasters. The capitals of them are ornamented with griffins and flowers. Among them a long frieze with griffins decorated the whole sekos.

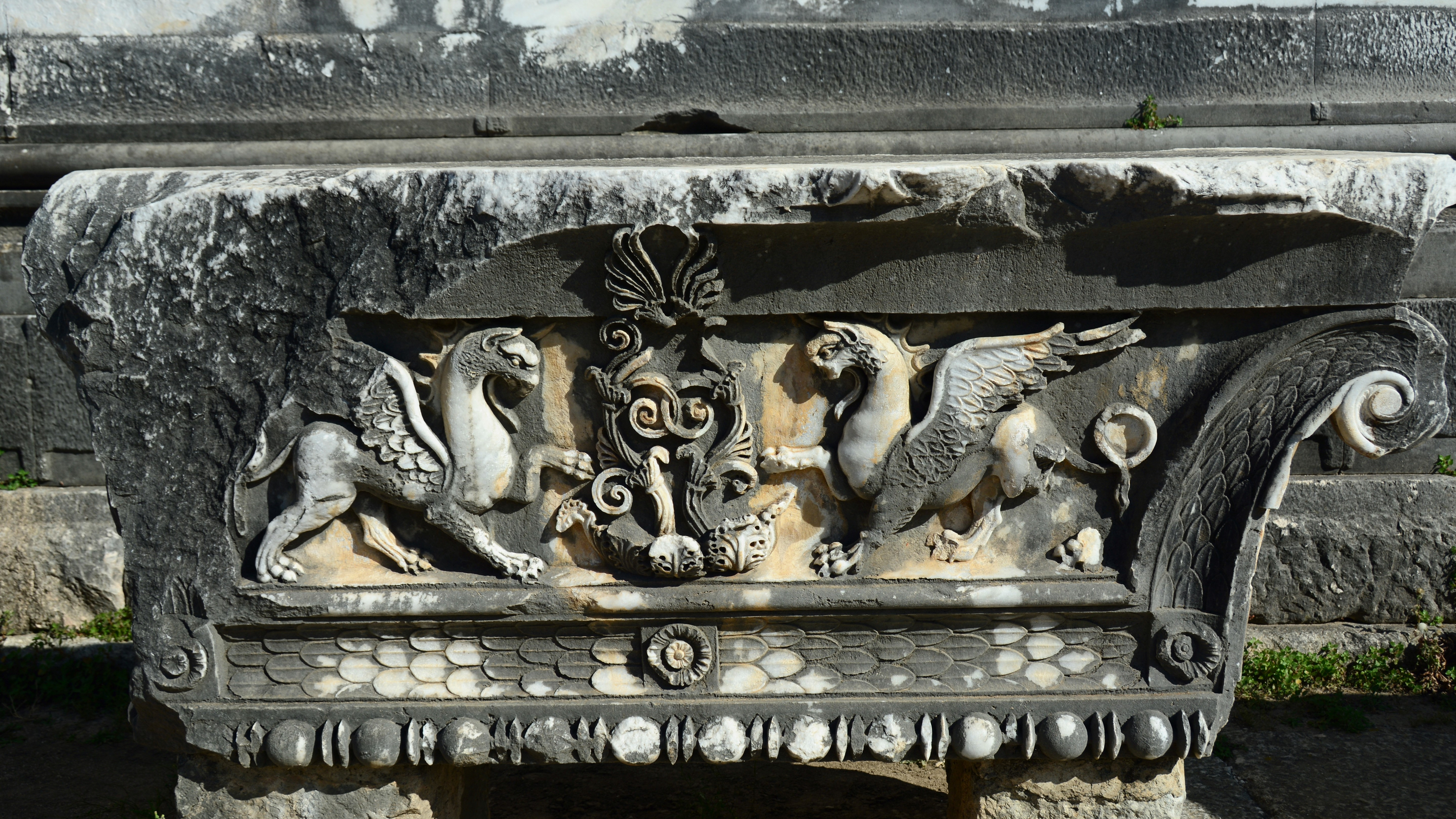
A pilaster capital with griffins.

Between the two tunnel exits in the sekos a monumental staircase leads up to three openings into a room whose roof was supported by two columns on the central cross-axis. Among these three doors were placed two Corinthian half columns, whose spectacular capitals originally survived but during the First World War they were unfortunately destroyed. The room with the two central columns opened to the east to the great impassable portal. To the north and south of this hall two stairwells existed. In inscriptions they were called "labyrinthoi", probably because of their ceiling decoration showing a meander pattern. These labyrinthoi lead to the roof of the temple and their function is not yet clear.

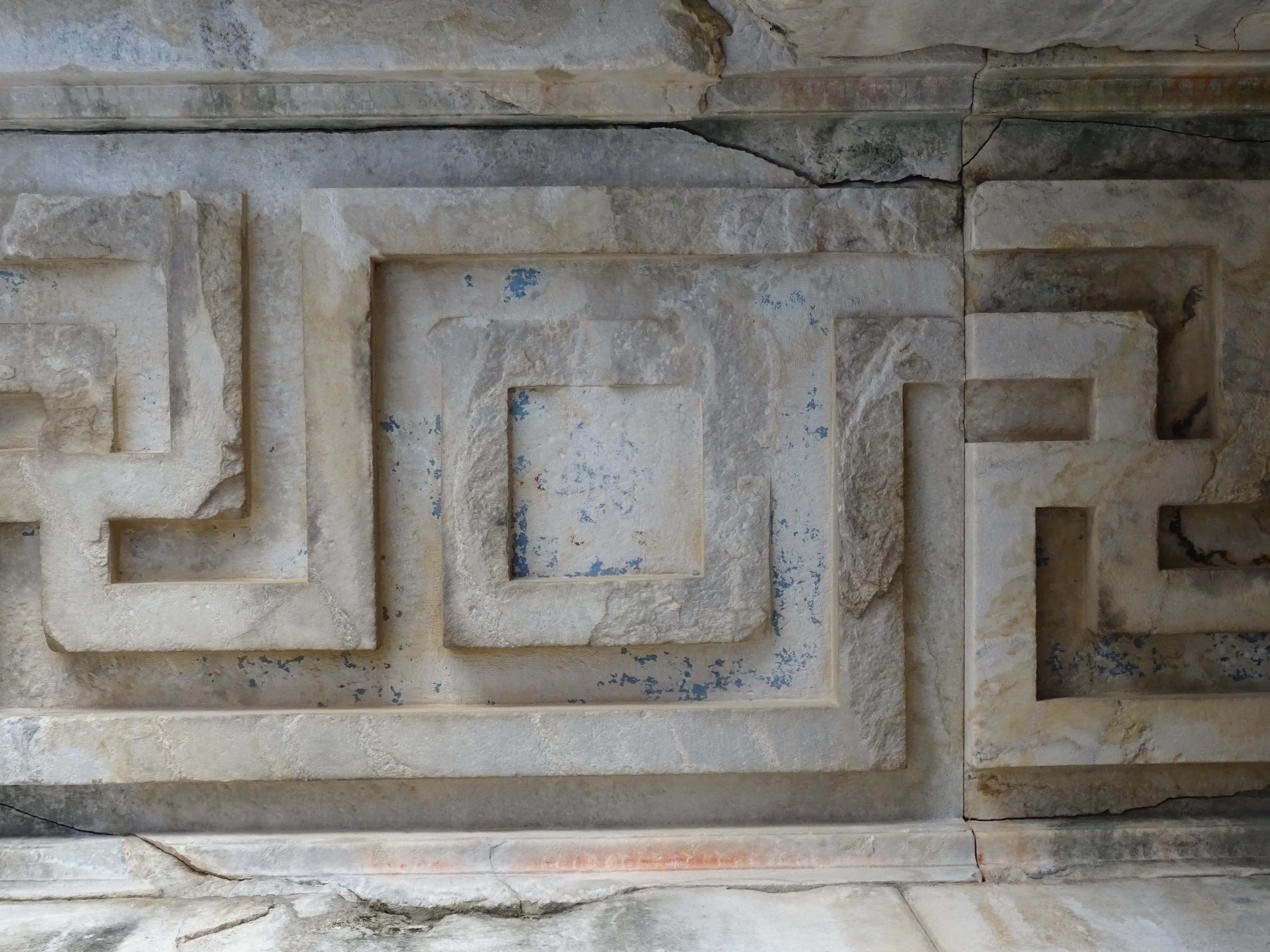
The ceiling of the "labyrinthoi" with the famous meander pattern.

The oracular procedure so well documented at Delphi is almost unknown at Didyma and must be reconstructed on the basis of the temple's construction. The priestess sat above the oracle spring and was inspired by Apollo. The prophet announced the oracle probably from the room with the high and impassable threshold. The answers were delivered, as in Delphi, in classical hexameters. But at Delphi, nothing was written; at Didyma, inquiries and answers were written and some inscriptions with them were found. In Didyma a small structure, the Chresmographion featured in this process; it was situated outside the temple because according to inscriptions it was used for storing architectural members for the temple there.

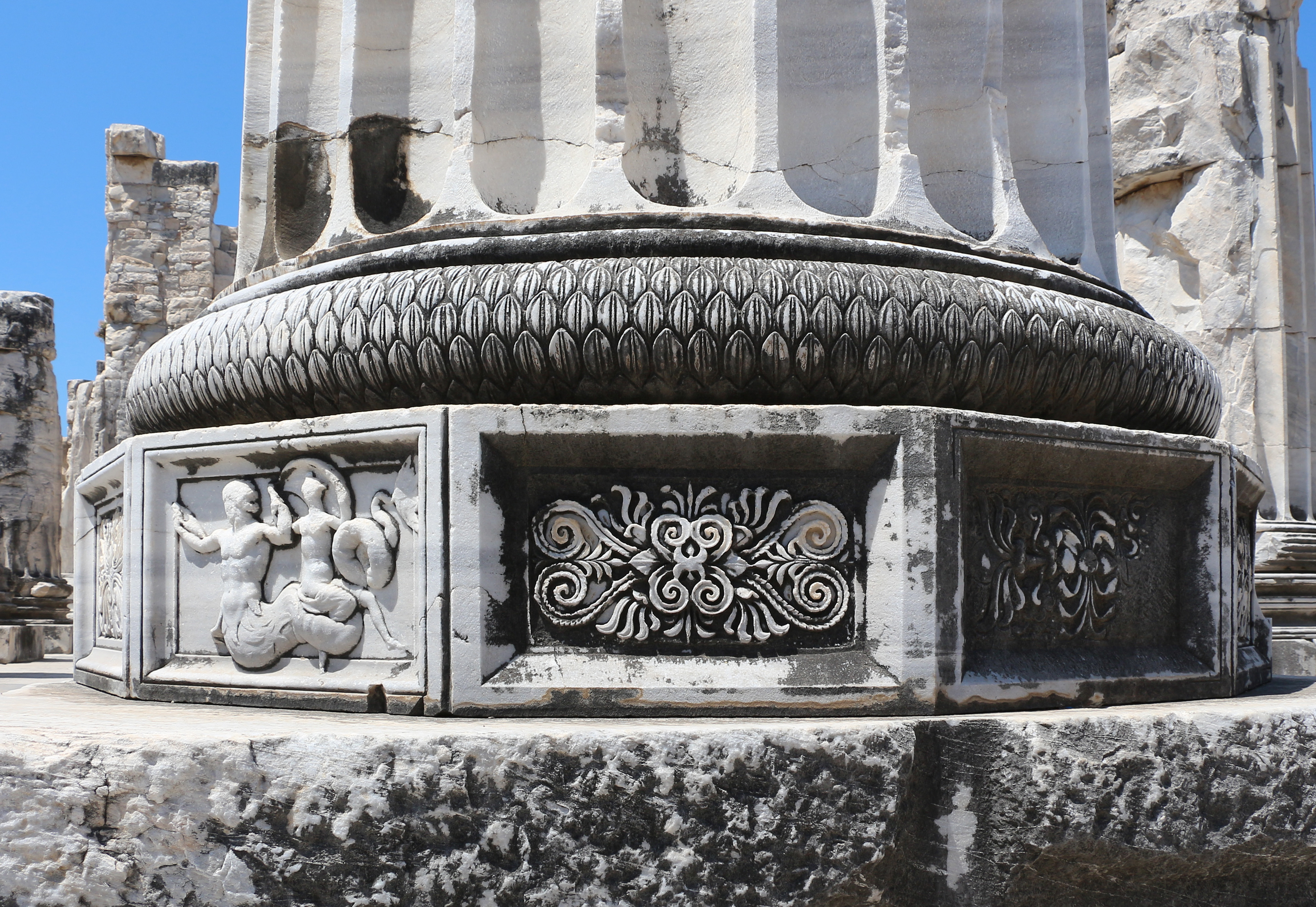
A base of a column of the eastern facade.

Although the construction work continued for over 600 years the temple of Apollo was never completed. But the main body of the temple itself had been completed around 100 BC. In the following centuries Miletus continued to erect the columns of the colonnade. The columns of the eastern façade were built during the reign of emperor Hadrian. The western facade was completed too and some columns on the flanks. The roof was also never entirely finished; the temple lacked the pediments. There were also other parts of this huge temple which remained unfinished. Therefore, this building is totally unique in Greek architecture. It is like a handbook on this topic which informs you about all the different stages of constructing a temple. When something is unfinished it becomes easier to see the process of construction. This "book" begins in the quarries of Miletus at the former Latmian Gulf (today Bafa Gölü) and leads from the harbours there to the harbour of Didyma (former Panormos, today Mavisehir). From there along the road to the sanctuary and then into the sanctuary. At all these places unfinished architectural members of the temple are visible. The inner walls of the sekos remained unpolished too. That's why Lothar Haselberger could discover there the Hellenistic construction drawings. This discovery and interpretation led to some important information about the planning and the building phase of the Apollo temple. In particular, the very famous one of the draft of a column of the temple of Apollo is on the northern sekos wall. On the western wall inside the sekos the inscribed pictorial instructions of the pediment of a small temple is scratched in. Because the inscribed architectural members are similar in style to the naiskos of Apollo, Haselberger and other scholars thought that it could have been the design drawings of the naiskos. But one problem persisted unsolved, because the drawn pediment is over 2 meters wider than the actual one of the naiskos of Apollo.

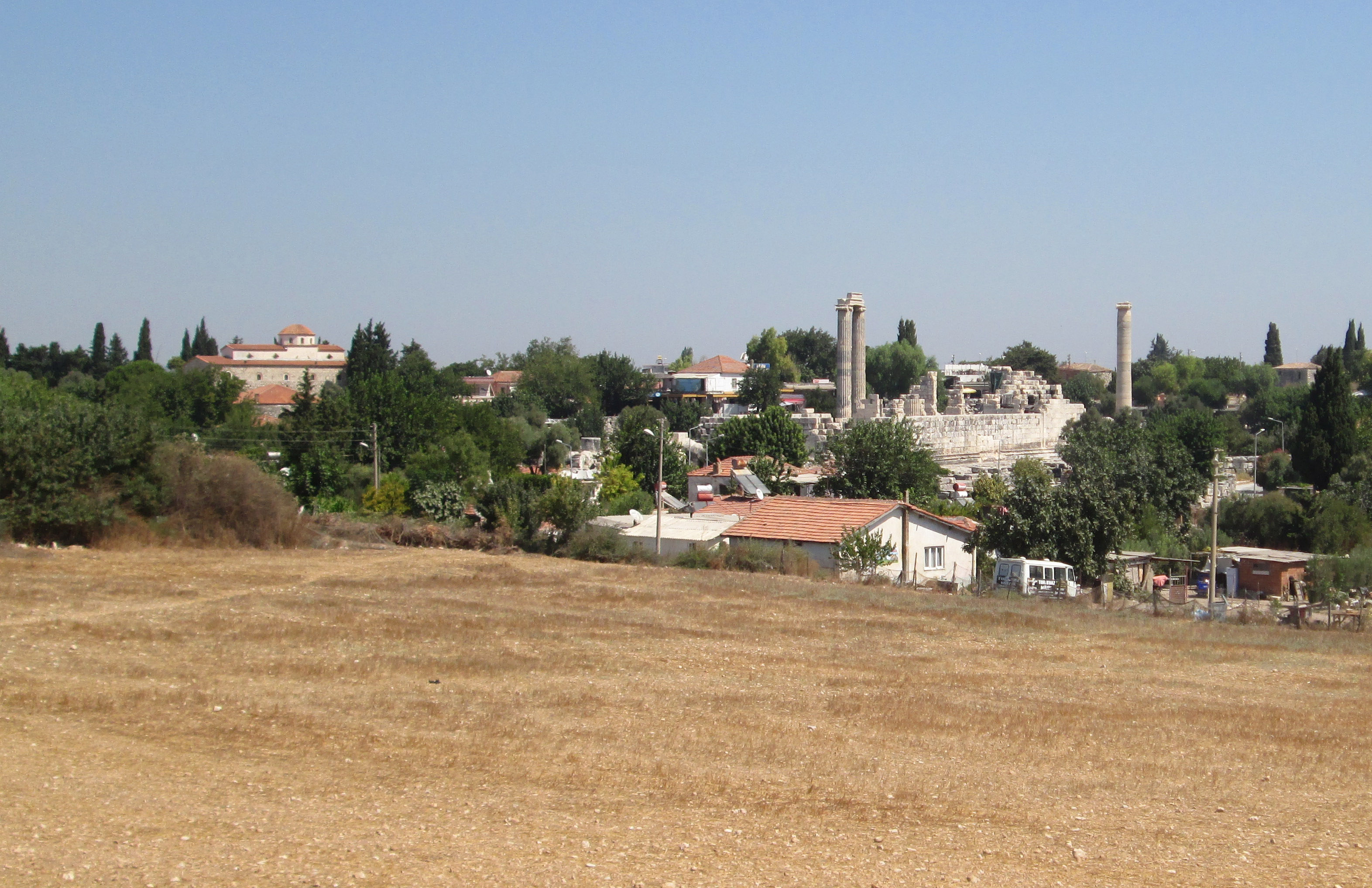
The mosque (with the temple of Artemis behind) and the temple of Apollo eastwards

This perplexing enigma was eventually unravelled in 2012. It had been clear that the drawing on the western sekos wall would also suit to the rediscovered fragments of architectural members from the temple of Artemis also. So the Hellenistic temple of Artemis was designed with Apollo's naiskos as a model, drawn upon the wall behind the naiskos in the 2nd century BC. The only existing problem was to find a foundation with the width of the drawing (10,71 meters).

When constructing the temple of Apollo at Didyma, white marble was most prominently used in the visible parts of the building such as the outer parts of the walls and the ionic columns. Utilising a multi-method approach including petrology and isotope analyses of carbon and oxygen, researchers have found four major marble sources which correlates to different phases of construction. During the Hellenistic and Roman periods, Milesian marble that originated around Lake Bafa was most widely used. However, after a short hiatus in construction, Thasian Marble, which originated from Aliki on Thasos Island, was imported and unsystematically alternated with Milesian marble in building the column drums to speed up construction. This source of marble was then replaced by importing Herakleian marble from Lake Bafa just before the dodekastylos was finished. In the Imperial period, Proconnesian marble from Marmara Island was used as a substitution for local Milesian marble.

For less visible parts of the building such as the massive foundations of the stairs, the cross-linked foundation piers under peristalsis and walls and the cores of the walls, limestone was used. The estimated volume of limestone needed for its construction significantly exceeded 12,200 m³ or 33.000 metric tons, which was a major industrial achievement for its time. The limestone used in building the temple originated from the few previously known small quarries from the south-western Milesian Peninsula as well as smaller inconspicuous pits that covers most of the limestone plateau in the vicinity of the building. The limestone has shown geological characteristics of being dense, locally cavernous with a whitish to cream color and are generally fossil-poor. This makes it a good building material that could protect the architecture from weathering.

=== The temple of Artemis ===
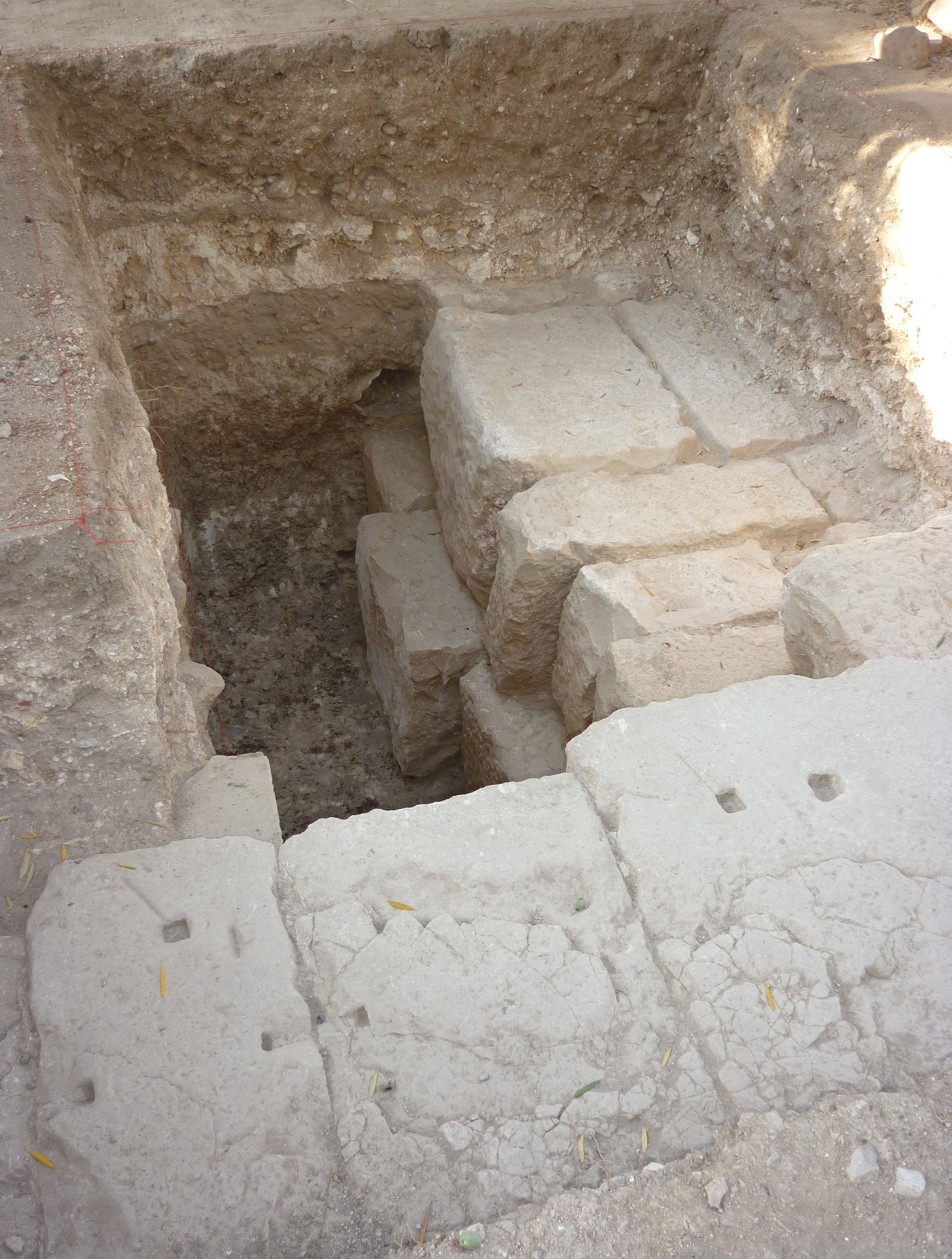
Foundations of the temple of Artemis northwards.

The foundations of the temple of Artemis were discovered in 2013 directly behind the mosque and former Greek Orthodox church of Saint Charalambos 100 m north of the temple of Apollo. In contrast to the temple of Apollo the foundation of the temple of Artemis is orientated exactly East-West, as it is common for most Greek temples. The remains of the foundations show that the temple had the dimensions of 31,60 meters long and 11,50 meters wide. The extant limestone blocks prove that the temple of Artemis had three rooms. Parts of its superstructure came not to light in situ. After the excavations the foundations were reinterred after each campaign, so today nothing is visible of them. It is not altogether clear if the temple of Artemis was orientated to the east or to the west because its altar has not yet been found. During excavations at the east side came no remains of the altar to light, and the area in front of the west side has not yet been excavated. So it is more likely that the temple was orientated to the west because generally the altar was situated in front of Greek temples. This supposition is strengthened by the fact that the two most famous temples of Artemis in Asia Minor, at Ephesus and at Magnesia ad Maeandrum, were also faced to the west.

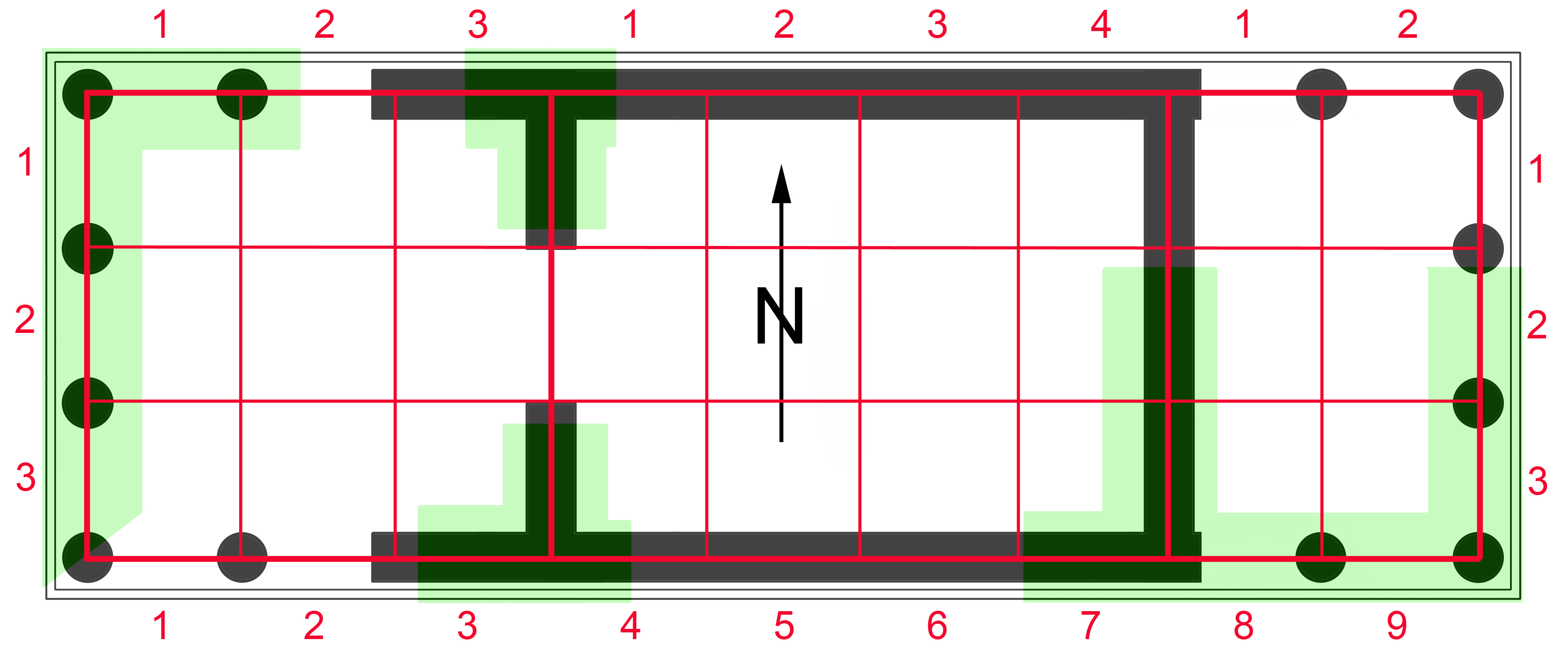
Reconstructed floor plan of the Hellenistic temple of Artemis as tetrastyle amphiprostylos orientated to the west (light-green: extant foundations; black: probable position of walls and columns; red: grid with the proportions of the rooms and of the whole building)

During excavations in 1994, to the south of the mosque, an Ionic architrave and frieze blocks of an unknown building had been excavated. These blocks of white marble bear almost the same pattern and size as architrave and frieze from the Hellenistic naiskos of Apollo. Therefore, it seemed likely they belonged to the elusive and tantalising temple of Artemis because of the twinning stylistic components. But this idea was only proven by Ulf Weber in 2012. The architrave and frieze blocks from the Artemis temple are deeper and wider than the ones from Apollo's naiskos. A cornice block (consisting of geison and sima), already found in 1909, but first investigated in 2012 belongs to them. It was the keystone to solve the riddle.

For architrave, frieze and cornice are derived from a wider temple than the naiskos. Further they match perfectly to the construction drawing in the sekos. Finally this construction drawing matches the proportions of the new temple foundation. That means the Ionic temple of Artemis had four front columns and its length was exactly three times longer than its width. Another difference between the naiskos of Apollo and the temple of his sister Artemis concerns the time of their construction. The ornamentation of the naiskos can stylistically be dated around 300 BC, but the ornaments of the temple of Artemis date in the 2nd century BC. Hence the date of the new temple is known, but though it seems likely that it was dedicated to Artemis there remains speculation, especially as no inscription was found on the architectural members?

Older inscriptions from the 6th century BC show that beside Apollo, both Artemis and Hekate had been worshipped in Didyma. Another inscription from the 3rd century BC mentions the cult statue of Artemis. In later inscriptions reconstruction works of the temple of Artemis are reported. Therefore, there can be no doubt that Artemis had her own temple in Didyma. She was the main deity beside Apollo, and to no other deity worshipped in Didyma is a temple documented. Furthermore, Artemis is the twin sister of Apollo. All this leads to the conclusion that this temple designed according to Apollo's naiskos must be the one of Artemis and it stood originally on the promontory north of the temple of Apollo.

In the end these results contradict Klaus Tuchelt's view that the sanctuary of Artemis was situated west of the sacred way, as Helga Bumke had some years ago already suggested.

=== Sacred Way with the Roman baths ===
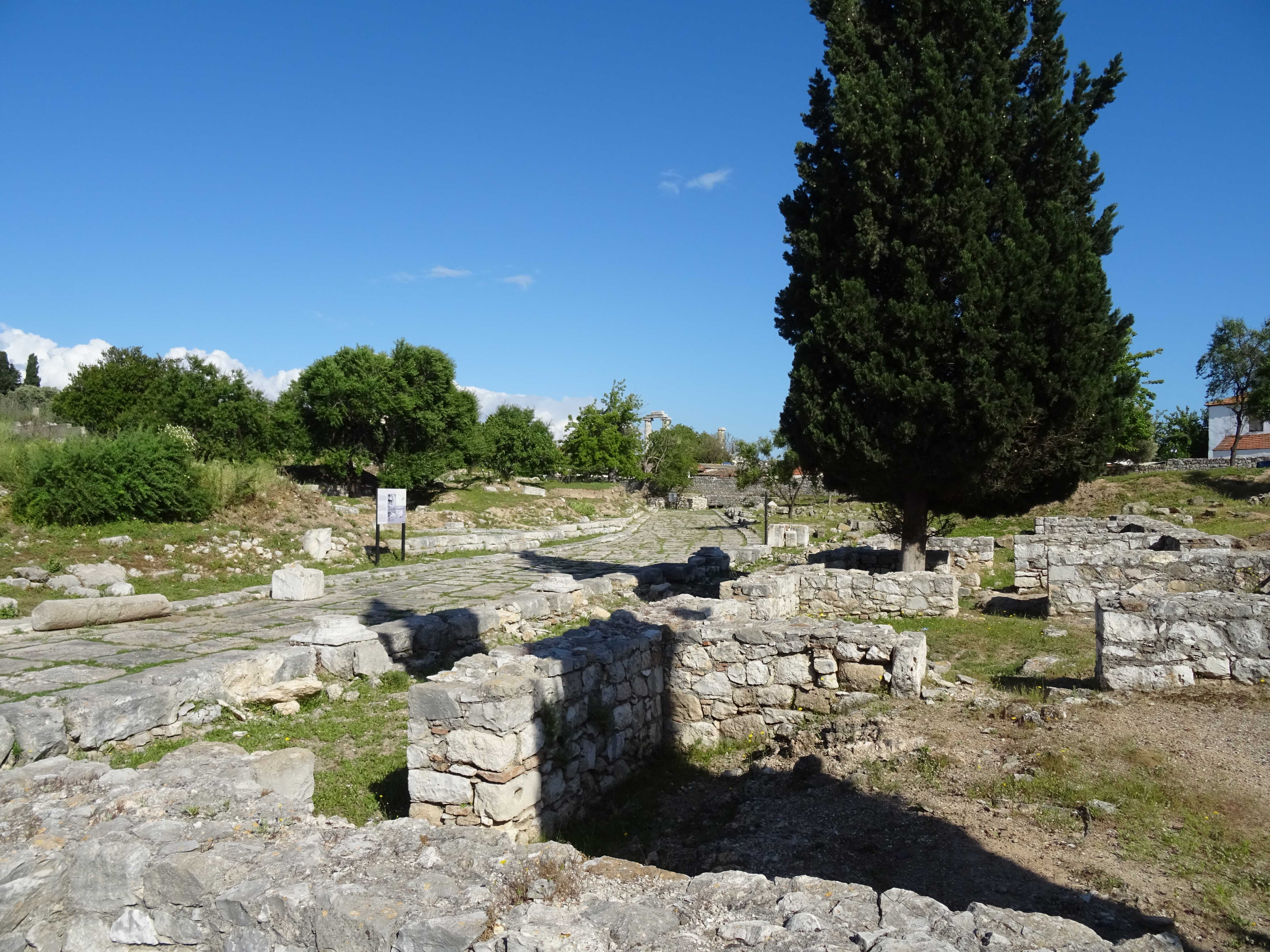
The Sacred Way from Miletus with the remains of the stoa.

The Sacred Way inside the sanctuary of Apollo was excavated under Klaus Tuchelt. He found the remains of different buildings from the Archaic period along the wide and plastered road. To the west of the road the rock comes to the surface. Situated there were some wells, basins and small water canals. Their usage is not yet really clear, but they could have had a cultic function. Along the road during the Roman period stood a stoa. It also flanked the passageway to the Roman baths. So the stoai together with the water facilities make it more likely that the complex, of the so-called „Felsbarre", served for profane reasons. One option would be a function similar to a Roman macellum (food market), as proposed by Helga Bumke.

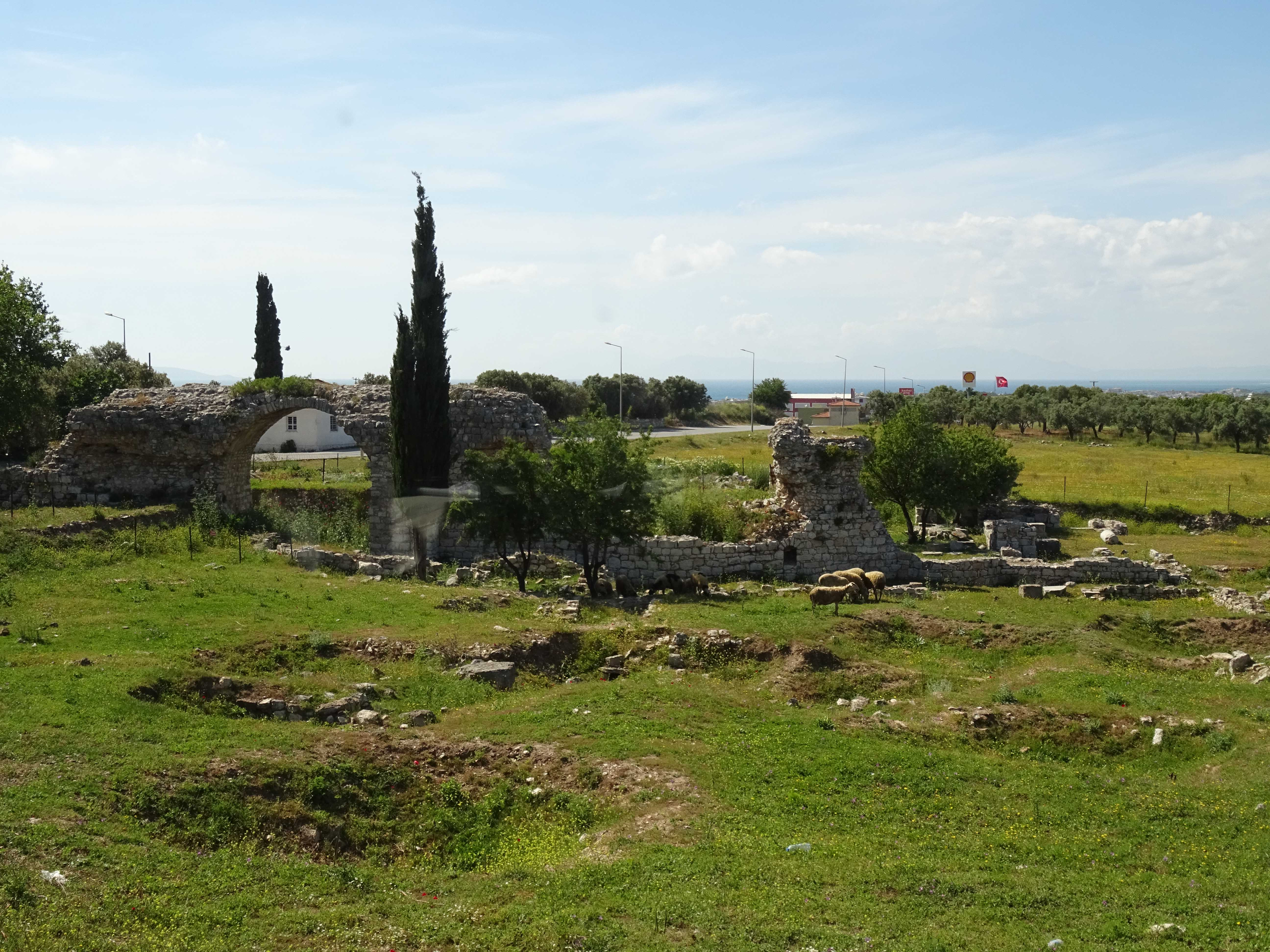
The ruins of the Roman baths northwestwards.

The Roman baths at the end of an alley were erected in the 2nd century AD. Rudolf Naumann investigated them and found impressive mosaics in the entrance hall, the apodyterium. It was followed by the frigidarium, the tepidarium and caldarium. The baths were used until the 6th/7th century AD, as were other buildings along the Sacred Way.

=== Stadium ===
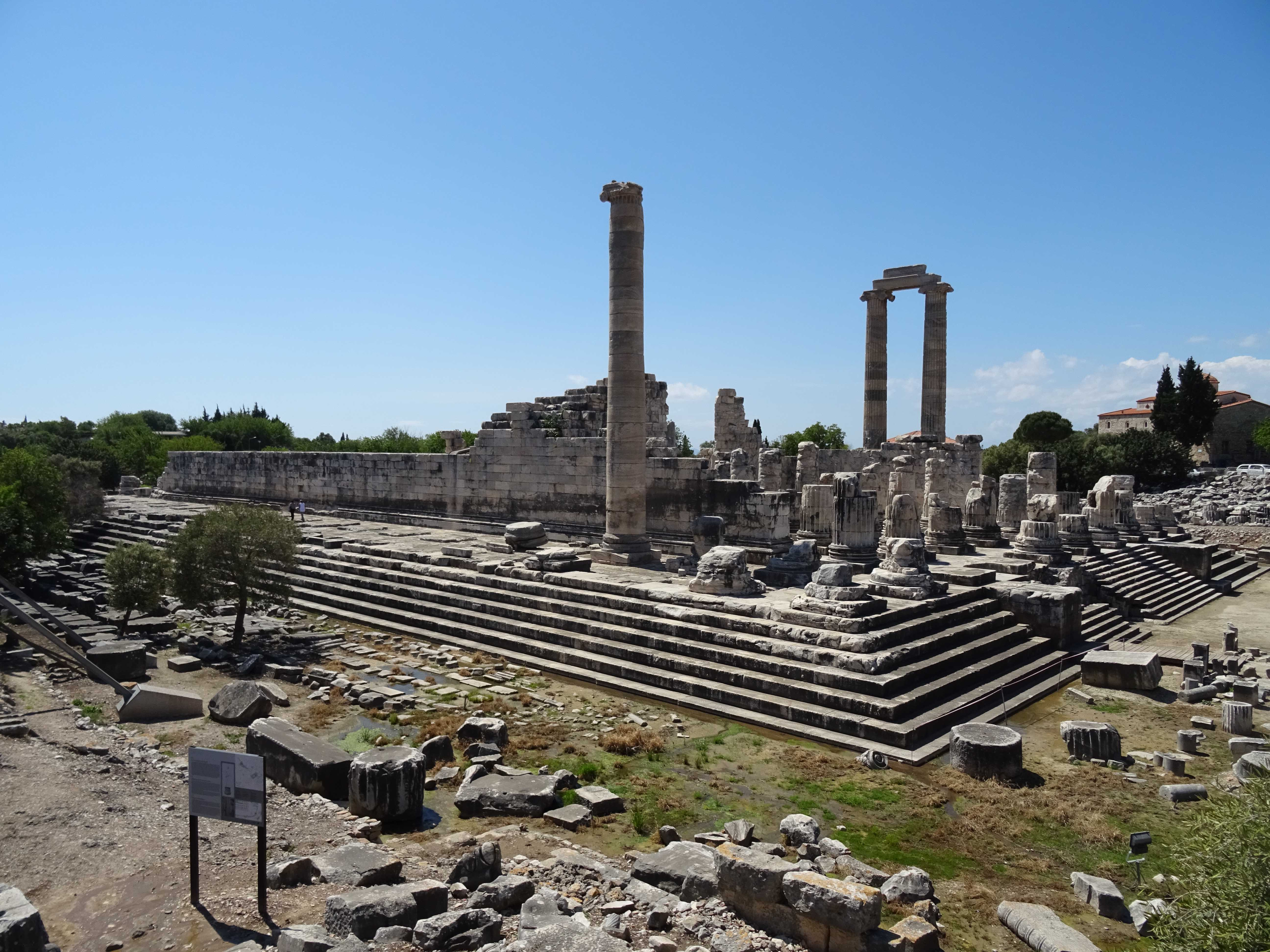
The southern flank of the temple of Apollo with the stadium.

Parallel to the southern colonnade of the temple of Apollo was situated a stadium which dates from the Hellenistic period, though athletic agons were probably held there earlier. The steps of the temple's crepidoma served as seats for the spectators on the northern side of the stadium. Upon these seven steps are engraved many „topos inscriptions".

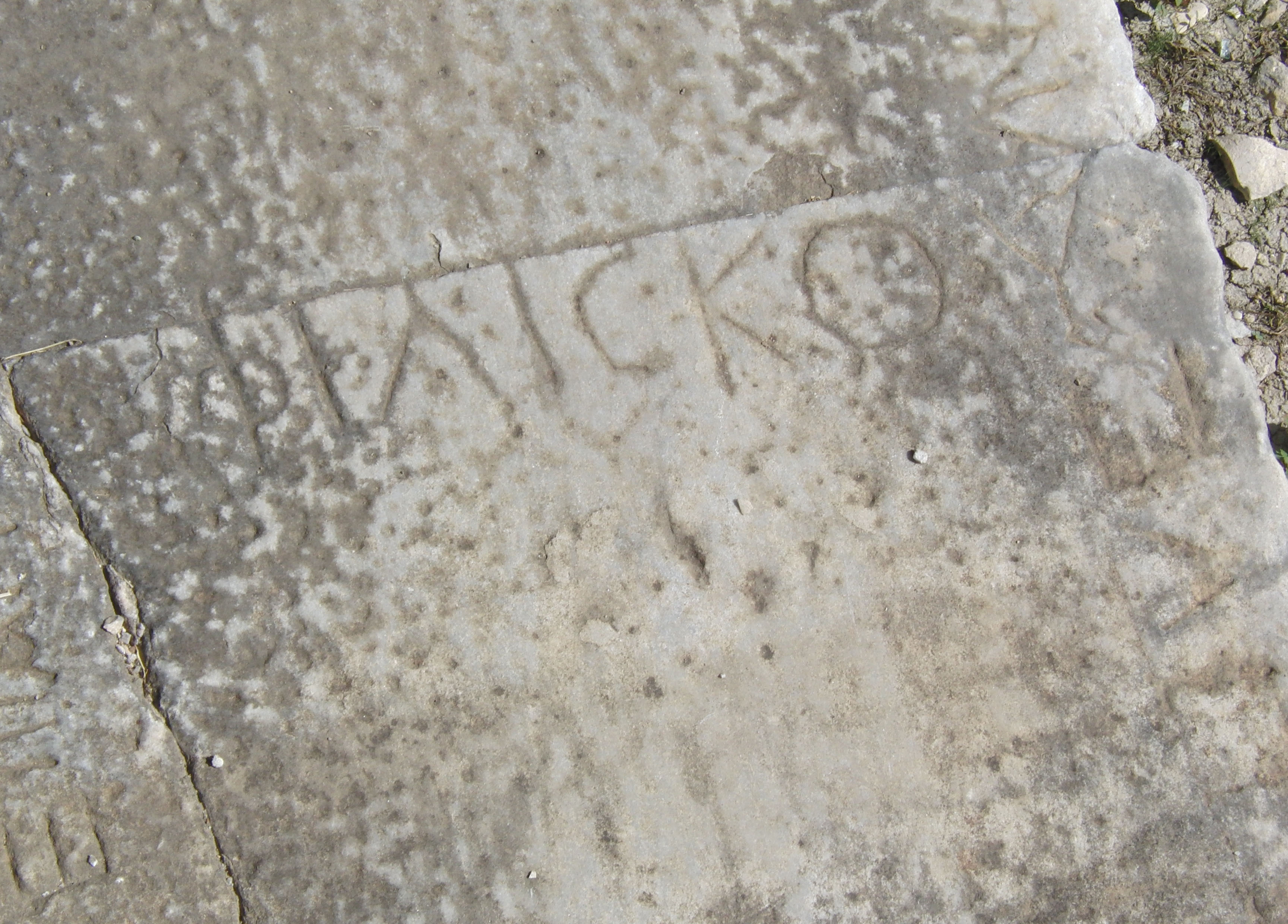
Southern crepidoma of the temple of Apollo with a "topos inscription": ΦΙΛΙΣΚΟΥ (Seat of Philiskos).

That means the spectators marked their seats engraving their names. As these inscriptions are also found on the southern part of the western colonnade it seems likely that the stadium was longer than the south side of the temple of Apollo. The average stadium length was usually about 190 meters (one stadion). The seating on the southern side of the stadium consisted of tiers of limestone blocks with seven or eight steps. The remains of a device for starting the contests are extant near the southeast corner of the Apollo temple.

Astonishingly, the blocks of the southern tier of the stadium were reused for the cavea of the theatre in the second half of the 1st century AD. One can but assume that the music agons became more important and influential than the athletic ones.

=== Theatre ===
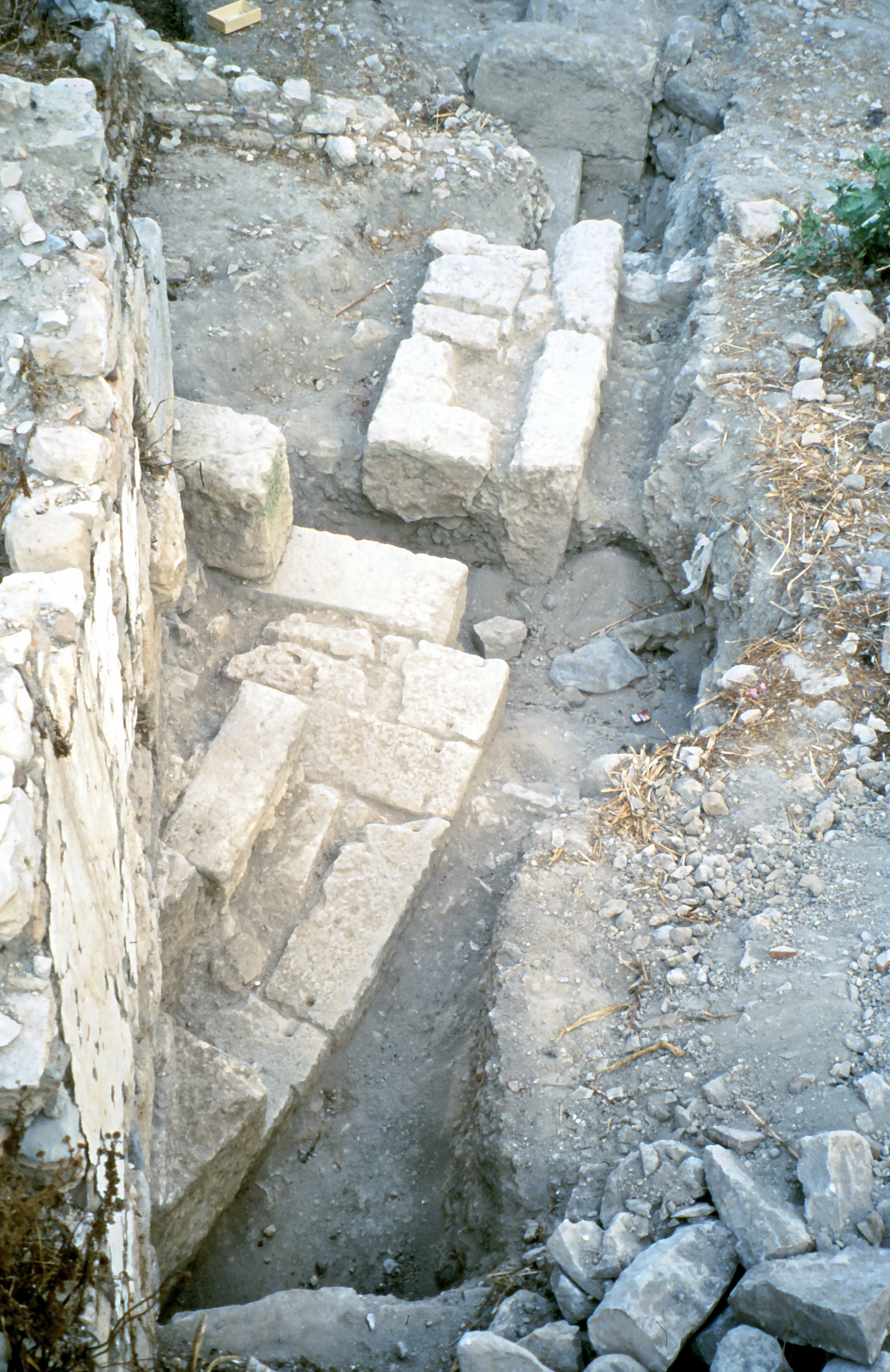
The northern wall of the cavea westwards.

The remains of the Greek theatre came to light during 2010 and 2011. The walls, stairs and steps of the cavea were a totally unexpected find. Evidence that the theatre arose in the second half of the 1st century AD is indicated by the find of a coin dating from the time of the Roman emperor Nero and a lot of sherds from the same period. Then the cavea had a diameter of 52 meters and could receive 3000 spectators. Later in the first half of the 2nd century AD it was enlarged to a diameter of 61 meters and 4000 spectators would have found a seat.

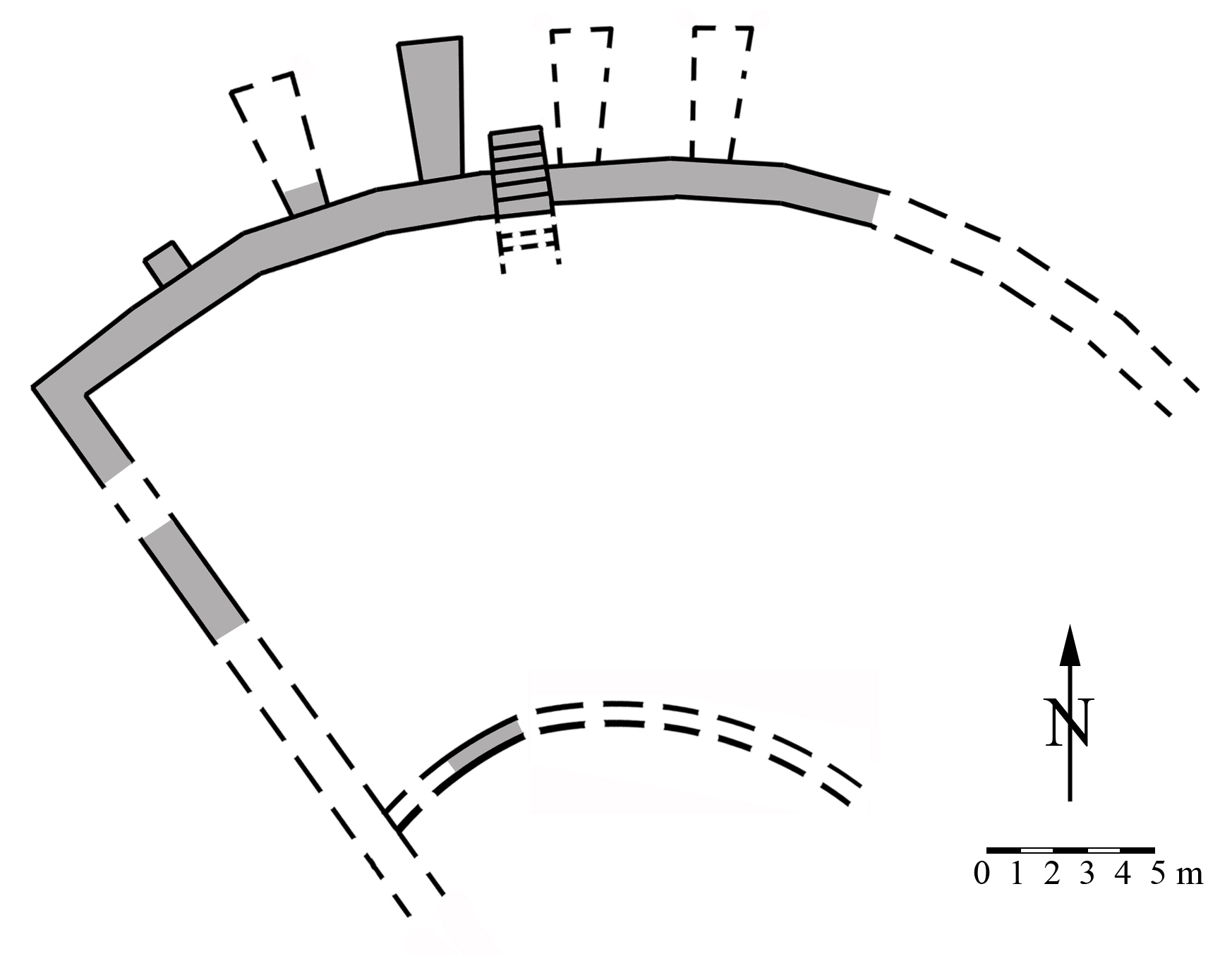
North half of the Cavea with the excavated walls and stairs (gray).

At this present time it has not been possible to excavate the foundations of the stage building, but the architectural members of a building typical for a scene building are known since the beginning of the 20th century. After the cavea of the theatre was excavated Helga Bumke suggested that the entablature of the so-called „Tabernakel" building was part of the scene building. The inscribed dedications on the architraves reveals that the stage building was consecrated to the gods Apollo, Artemis, Leto, Zeus, the emperor Hadrian and the people of Miletus. But it is not known who dedicated this building. As emperor Hadrian visited Miletus and Didyma in 129 AD the scene building was probably complete by that time. The winners of the musical contests, organized to worship Apollo, were honoured in several inscriptions from the Roman period. These competitions took place in the newly found theatre, but it can be assumed that a Hellenistic predecessor existed. An inscription from the beginning 3rd century BC reports that Antiochos I received a seat of honour during the choir contests at Didyma.

=== Other Buildings ===
The ancient inscriptions of Didyma testify that many more buildings existed there in antiquity than the mentioned ones above. During the many years of excavations hundreds of architectural fragments came to light which could be not allocated to a known building or monument. One of them is a Doric stoa from the 2nd century BC, and another one the so-called „Prophetenhaus" or chresmographeion, a smaller Doric building also from the 2nd century BC. The search of the foundations of these and other structures is difficult because the area around Apollo's temple is closely built-up. Therefore, it is almost impossible to use geophysical prospecting methods for the search. Interpreting the written sources and old maps make it possible to find places with ancient foundations. This was done by Helga Bumke in the case of the foundation of the temple of Artemis and another Hellenistic foundation southeast of the temple of Apollo in 2013. This squarish substructure measuring 11 meters by 12 meters consisted of limestone blocks, but no superstructure came to light. It may have had a cultic function because it is characterised by the same curious orientation as the temple of Apollo (or it was used as a propylon). Above the substructure was a small church built in Byzantine times which has seen several reconstructions up until the 19th century.

=== Churches ===
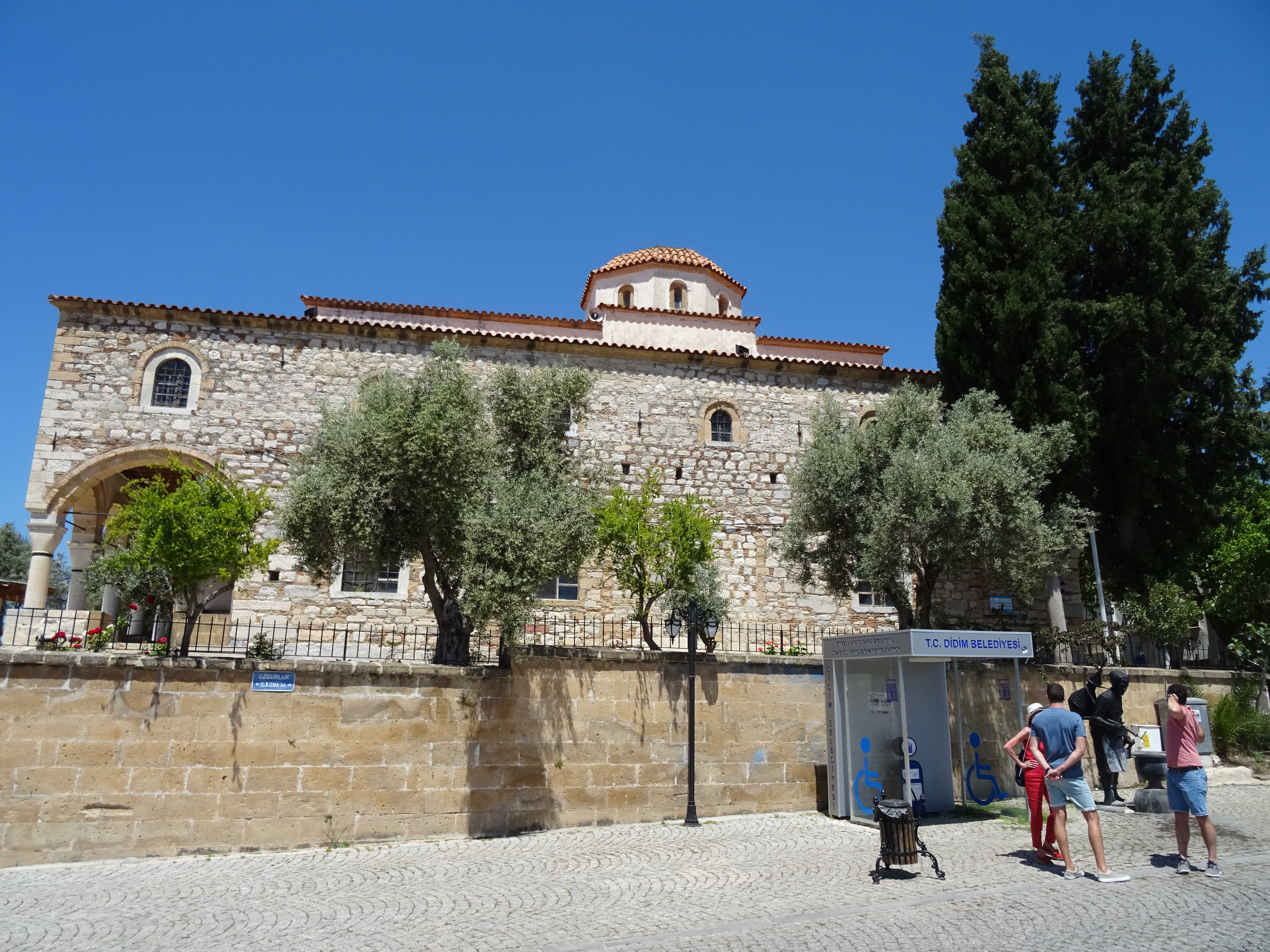
The mosque and formerly church northwards (the foundations of the temple of Artemis are behind).

The most famous church of Didyma stood in the sekos of the temple of Apollo. Its final remains were demolished in 1925. This church was made with blocks from the naiskos and other small buildings from outside the temple around 500 AD. After a serious earthquake in the 7th century AD, a reconstruction of the three-aisled basilica was erected. In the 11th century AD, another earthquake occurred and the church in the sekos collapsed. This was replaced by only a small chapel which was used for the Christian cult. Another early Christian church was constructed 100 meters north of the temple of Apollo, at approximately the same location where today the mosque stands. This church also employed the use of ancient blocks salvaged from the temple of Artemis nearby and the previously mentioned Doric stoa above. Its later history is not yet clear, but in 1830 their remains were used to erect a new church (dedicated to Saint Charalambos) for the recently arrived Greek settlers. In 1924 it was converted into a mosque for the Muslims just transported from North Greece during the Exchange of Populations.

More chapels or churches surely existed in Byzantine Didyma because it was the seat of a bishopric, but about this age little is known. Some of these Byzantine churches either fell into disrepair or used as animal pens after the area was abandoned in the 16th century and reused by the newly settled Greeks at the end of the 18th century when the quarrying of the temple marble became a profitable trade.

== See also ==
- Idyma
