= Conon (mythographer) =

Greek mythographer

Conon (Ancient Greek: Κόνων, gen.: Κόνωνος) was a Greek grammarian and mythographer of the age of Augustus (who lived 63 BC – 14 AD), the author of a work titled Διηγήσεις (Narrations), addressed to Archelaus Philopator, king of Cappadocia. It was a collection of fifty narratives relating to the mythical and heroic period, and especially the foundation of colonies.

An epitome of the work was preserved in the Bibliotheca of Photius, the 9th-century patriarch of Constantinople. Photius commends Conon's Attic style, and remarks that Nicolaus Damascenus borrowed much from him. There are separate editions of this abstract by Gale, by Teucher, and Kanne.

Dion Chrysostom mentions a rhetorician of this name, who may possibly be identical.

== Sources ==
- Conon, Fifty Narrations English translation by Brady Kiesling
- Text in Greek and translation to French by Abbé GEDOYN
