= Homoerotic themes in Greek and Roman mythology =

Homoeroticism is a prominent theme in Greco-Roman mythology, with many myths depicting intimate and romantic relationships between men. These are accompanied by related motifs such as cross-dressing, androgyny, and fluid expressions of gender and identity.

These myths have been described as being crucially influential on Western LGBTQ+ literature, with the original myths being constantly re-published and re-written, and the relationships and characters serving as icons. In comparison, lesbian relationships are rarely found in classical myths.

== Homosexuality and bisexuality ==
Apollo, the god of music and prophecy, was often invoked to bless homosexual unions. Due to his numerous same-sex relationships, in modern times he's considered a patron of homosexual love. Apollo was also called "the champion of male love" by Andrew Callimach. Other gods are sometimes considered patrons of homosexual love between males, such as the love goddess Aphrodite and gods in her retinue, such as the Erotes: Eros, Himeros, Anteros and Pothos. Eros is also part of a trio of gods that played roles in homoerotic relationships, along with Heracles and Hermes, who bestowed qualities of beauty (and loyalty), strength, and eloquence, respectively, onto male lovers. Sappho's poetry contained strong devotion to Aphrodite as well as same–sex love between women, leading to Aphrodite being identified as a patron goddess of lesbians.

== Same-sex relationships and pursuits ==
- Achilles and Antilochus
- Achilles and Patroclus
- Agamemnon and Argynnus
- Ameinias and Narcissus
- Apollo and Admetus
- Apollo and Adonis
- Apollo and Boreas
- Apollo and Branchus
- Apollo and Carnus
- Apollo and Cyparissus
- Apollo and Helenus
- Apollo and Hyacinth
- Apollo and Hymenaios
- Apollo and Iapis
- Asclepius and Hippolytus
- Athena and Myrmex
- Athis and Lycabas
- Cephalus and Pterelaus
- Chiron and Dionysus
- Cleostratus and Menestratus
- Cycnus and Phaethon
- Cycnus and Phylius
- Cydon and Clytius
- Dionysus and Ampelus
- Dionysus and Prosymnus
- Dionysus and Staphylus
- Eurybarus and Alcyoneus
- Euxynthetus and Leucocomas
- Hephaestus and Peleus
- Heracles and Abderus
- Heracles and Diomus
- Heracles and Eurystheus
- Heracles and Hylas
- Heracles and Adonis
- Heracles and Argus
- Heracles and Iolaus
- Heracles and Nestor
- Hermes and Amphion
- Hermes and Crocus
- Hermes and Perseus
- Hermes and Pollux
- Hesperus and Hymenaeus
- Hymenaeus and Argynnus
- Hypnos and Endymion
- Kalamos and Karpos
- Laius and Chrysippus
- Marsyas and Olympus
- Meles and Timagoras
- Minos and Atymnius
- Minos and Ganymede
- Minos and Miletus
- Minos and Theseus
- Nisus and Euryalus
- Orestes and Pylades
- Orpheus and Kalais
- Pan and Daphnis
- Paris and Antheus
- Polyphemus and Silenus
- Poseidon and Nerites
- Poseidon and Pelops
- Rhadamanthus and Talos
- Sarpedon and Atymnius
- Sarpedon and Miletus
- Thamyris and Hyacinth
- Theseus and Pirithous
- Zephyrus and Cyparissus
- Zephyrus and Hyacinth
- Zeus and Ganymede

== Sex and gender ==
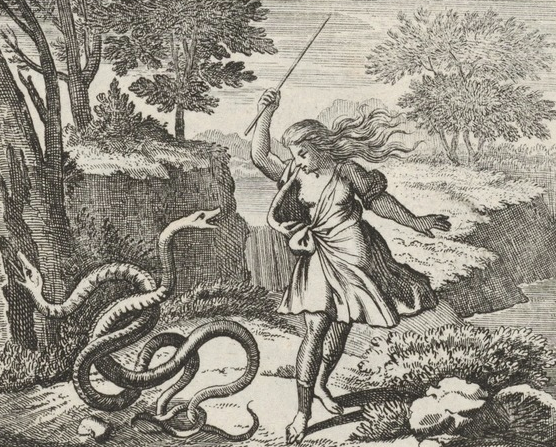
Tiresias strikes two snakes with a stick, and is transformed into a woman by Hera. Engraving by Johann Ulrich Kraus c. 1690. Taken from Die Verwandlungen des Ovidii (The Metamorphoses of Ovid).

=== Transgender ===
The gender-change theme also occurred in classical mythology. The reason for the transformation varies, as in the case of Siproites (Σιπροίτης), a hunter from Crete, who was transformed to a woman by Artemis after having seen the goddess bathing/nude.

There was also a motif of a woman needing to disguise herself as a male and later being transformed into a biological male by mysterious forces (mainly the gods). In the cases of Iphis and Leucippus, the woman's mother was pressured (by her husband) to bear a male child so the protagonist was forced to impersonate a male from birth. Later in life, manhood was "granted" through the blessing of a deity (Juno/Hera in Iphis' case and Leto in Leucippus').

Caeneus and Mestra, each of whom was a mate of a god (Caeneus was a rape victim of Poseidon/Neptune and Mestra was a lover of the same god), were granted manhood by the said god. Mestra, however, had the ability to change her shape voluntarily, instead of staying in male form like Caeneus and other instances above.

Tiresias, on the other hand, became female because he struck a couple of copulating snakes, displeasing Hera, who punished him by transforming Tiresias into a woman. Later the sentence was remitted, due to either trampling on the mating snakes or avoiding them, and he became male again. In another version, Tiresias' sex-change was caused by an argument between Zeus and Hera, on which they debated whether a male or a female had greater pleasure in sex, so they transformed him into a female to experiment.

- Caeneus
- Iphis
- Leucippus
- Mestra
- Siproites
- Tiresias

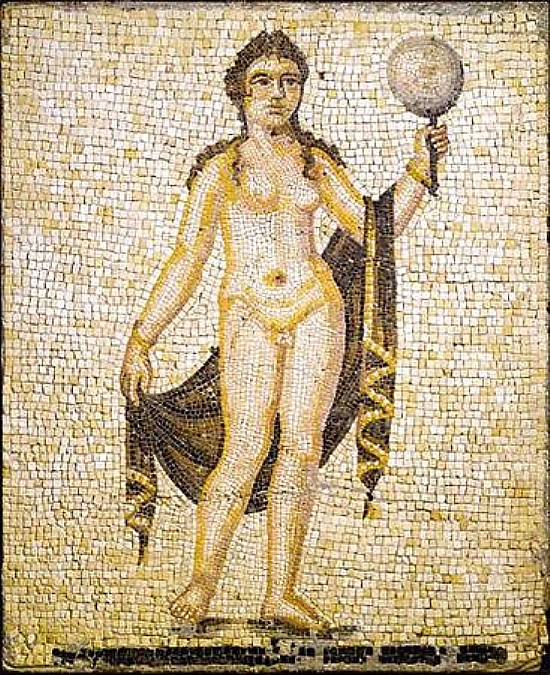
Mosaic of Hermaphroditus, North Africa, Roman period, 2nd-3rd century AD

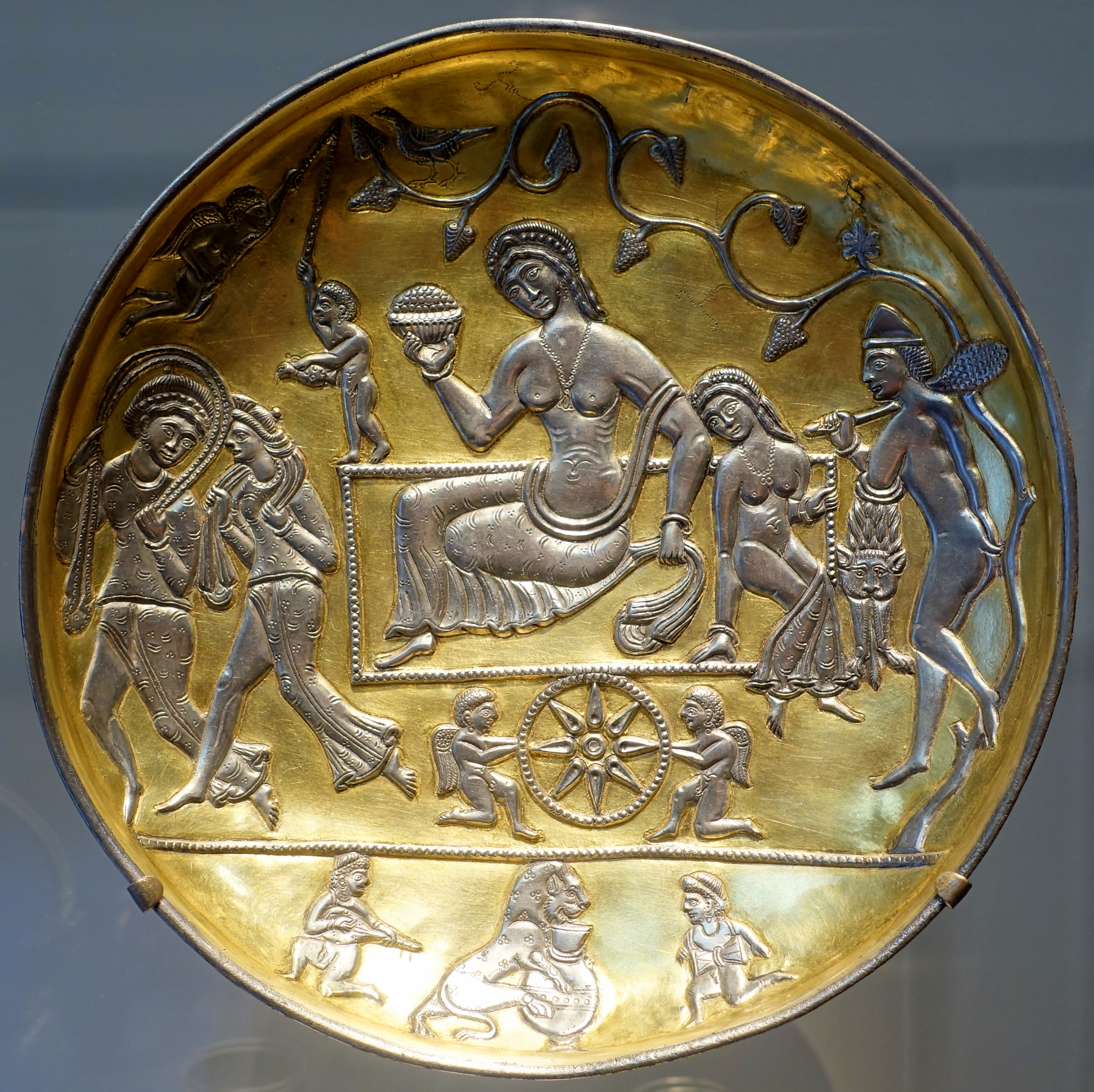
Plate depicting an androgynous Dionysus (depicted here with female-like breasts) with Ariadne and Satyr (or Heracles). Iran, Sasanian dynasty, 5th-7th c AD. Silver and gilt. National Museum of Asian Art collection

=== Androgynes and intersex ===
According to Leah DeVun, a "traditional Hippocratic / Galenic model of sexual difference – popularized by the late antique physician Galen and the ascendant theory for much of the Middle Ages – viewed sex as a spectrum that encompassed masculine men, feminine women, and many shades in between, including hermaphrodites, a perfect balance of male and female". DeVun contrasts this with an Artistotelian view of intersex, which argued that "hermaphrodites were not an intermediate sex but a case of doubled or superfluous genitals", and this later influenced Aquinas.

Hermaphroditus (also the namesake of the word hermaphrodite), the son of Hermes and Aphrodite, is considered the god of hermaphrodites and intersex people. Hermaphroditus was depicted as a winged youth with both male and female features, that is, usually female thighs, breasts, and style of hair, and male genitalia.

Dionysus has been dubbed "a patron god of hermaphrodites and transvestites" by Roberto C. Ferrari in the 2002 Encyclopedia of Gay, Lesbian, Bisexual, Transgender, and Queer Culture. He is often described as effeminate or "man-womanish" In ancient greek and roman literature. According to Seneca's Oedipus, Dionysus wore female clothing as a child to evade Hera's wrath, and even after reaching adulthood and reconciling with her, he continued to wear and favor feminine attire and ornaments. His adversary Lycurgus mocks Dionysus's effeminate appearance, describing his attire as women's garments. the satirist Lucian satirizes his effeminacy in Dialogues of the Gods and The Parliament of the Gods. In Orphic Hymn 41, the goddess Mise is referred to as an aspect of Dionysus, who is described as "male and female" (ἄρσενα καὶ θῆλυν).

In addition to Dionysus/Mise, several gods are referred to as "both male and female" or "both female and male" in the Orphic Hymns, including Selene, Athena, and Adonis. In Cyprus and Athens, an aspect of Aphrodite with male genitals and in some cases a beard, called Aphroditos, was worshipped. Macrobius (c. 400s AD) wrote in his Saturnalia, at 3.8.2:

There's also a statue of Venus on Cyprus, that's bearded, shaped and dressed like a woman, with scepter and male genitals, and they conceive her as both male and female. Aristophanes calls her Aphroditus, and Laevius says: Worshipping, then, the nurturing god Venus, whether she is male or female, just as the Moon is a nurturing goddess. In his Atthis, Philochorus, too, states that she is the Moon and that men sacrifice to her in women's dress, women in men's, because she is held to be both male and female.

- Agdistis (Cybele)
- Aphroditus
- The Enarees
- Hermaphroditus
- The Machlyes
- Phanes
- Salmacis
- The Scythians
- Venus Barbata
- Venus Castina

== See also ==
- LGBT themes in mythology
- LGBT themes in speculative fiction
- LGBT literature
- LGBT history
- Homosexuality in ancient Greece
- Homosexuality in ancient Rome
- Religion and homosexuality
- Transgender people and religion

== Bibliography ==
- Conner, Randy P.; Sparks, David Hatfield; Sparks, Mariya (1998). Cassell's Encyclopedia of Queer Myth, Symbol and Spirit. London: Cassell. ISBN 0-304-70423-7.
- Crompton, Louis (2006). Homosexuality and civilization. Harvard University Press. ISBN 978-0-674-02233-1.
- Downing, Christine (1989). Myths and mysteries of same-sex love. Continuum. ISBN 978-0-8264-0445-9.
- Kerenyi, Karl (1951). The Gods of the Greeks. London: Thames and Hudson.
- Miller, John F.; Strauss Clay, Jenny (2019). Tracking Hermes, Pursuing Mercury. Oxford: Oxford University Press. ISBN 978-0-19-877734-2.
- Penczak, Christopher (2003). Gay Witchcraft: Empowering the Tribe. Weiser. ISBN 978-1-57863-281-7.
- Pequigney, Joseph (2002). "Classical Mythology". GLBTQ Encyclopedia. New England Publishing Associates. Archived from the original on 15 April 2014.
