= LGBTQ themes in mythology =

LGBTQ themes in mythology occur in mythologies and religious narratives that include stories of romantic affection or sexuality between figures of the same sex or that feature divine actions that result in changes in gender. These myths are considered by some modern queer scholars to be forms of lesbian, gay, bisexual, transgender, or queer (LGBTQ) expression, and modern conceptions of sexuality and gender have been retroactively applied to them. Many mythologies ascribe homosexuality and gender fluidity in humans to the action of gods or of other supernatural interventions.

The presence of LGBTQ themes in mythologies has become the subject of intense study. The application of gender studies and queer theory to non-Western mythic tradition is less developed, but has grown since the end of the twentieth century. Myths often include being gay, bisexual, or transgender as symbols for sacred or mythic experiences. Devdutt Pattanaik argues that myths "capture the collective unconsciousness of a people", and that this means they reflect deep-rooted beliefs about variant sexualities that may be at odds with repressive social mores.

== Critical perspective ==
...Queer manifestations of sexuality, though repressed socially, squeeze their way into the myths, legends and lore of the land.

— Devdutt Pattanaik, The Man who was a Woman and other Queer Tales of Hindu Lore

The status of mythology varies by culture. Cultures may regard myths as containing psychological or archetypal truths. Myths may explain and validate the social institutions of a particular culture, as well as educate the members of that culture. This societal role has been posited for stories that included same-sex love, which educate people as to the correct attitude to adopt toward same-sex sexual activity and gender constructions.

Since the beginning of recorded history and in a multitude of cultures, myths, folklore and sacred texts have incorporated themes of same-sex eroticism and gender identity. Myths often include homosexuality, bisexuality or transgender themes as a symbol for sacred or mythic experiences. Homoeroticism or gender variance in myths have been analysed by mythologists and scholars according to modern conceptions of LGBT identities and behaviours, for example, deities that disguise themselves as, or adopt behaviors traditional to, the opposite gender for a given culture may be called transgender, and beings with no reproductive organs or with both male and female organs may be called androgynous or intersex. Individual myths have been denoted "queer" for rejecting a heteronormative and binary view of gender. The queer interpretations may be based on only indirect evidence, such as an unusually close same-sex friendship or dedication to chastity. Such readings have been criticised for ignoring cultural context or mis-applying modern or Western preconceptions, for example in assuming that celibacy means only avoiding penetration or reproductive sex (hence allowing homoerotic sex), while ignoring the widespread beliefs in the spiritual potency of semen that mandate an avoidance of all sex.

Researchers have long recognised the presence of LGBT themes in Western mythologies, and have studied the subject intensely. The application of gender studies and queer theory to non-Western mythic tradition is less developed, but has grown since the end of the twentieth century. Devdutt Pattanaik writes that myths "capture the collective unconsciousness of a people", and that this means they reflect deep-rooted beliefs about variant sexualities that may be at odds with repressive social mores.

Many mythologies ascribe homosexuality and gender variance in humans to the action of gods or other supernatural interventions. This includes myths in which gods teach people about same-sex sexual practices by example, as in Aztec religion or Hawaiian religion or myths that explain the cause for transgender identities or homosexuality, such as the story in which Prometheus accidentally creates some people with the wrong genitalia while drunk, or instances of reincarnation or possession by a spirit of the opposite gender in African diaspora religions.

It is common in polytheistic mythologies to find characters that can change gender, or have aspects of both male and female genders at the same time. Sexual activity with both genders is also common within such pantheons and is compared to modern bisexuality or pansexuality.

== Mythologies of Africa ==
=== Egyptian ===
Few records of homosexuality exist in Egyptian mythology, and existing written and pictorial works are reticent in representing sexualities. The sources that do exist indicate that same-sex relations were regarded negatively, and that penetrative sex was seen as an aggressive act of dominance and power, shameful to the receiver (a common view in the Mediterranean basin area).

The most well-known example of this occurs in the power-struggle between the sky-god Horus, and his uncle Set, the destructive god of the desert. Set's attempts to prove his superiority include schemes of seduction, in which he compliments Horus on his buttocks and tries to anally penetrate him. Unknowingly failing, Set ejaculates between Horus's thighs, allowing Horus to collect his semen to use against him. Set believes that he has conquered Horus by having "performed this aggressive act against him". Horus subsequently throws the semen in the river, so that he may not be said to have been inseminated by Set. Horus then deliberately spreads his own semen on some lettuce, which was Set's favorite food (the Egyptians regarded lettuce as phallic). After Set has eaten the lettuce, they go to the gods to try to settle the argument over the rule of Egypt. The gods first listen to Set's claim of dominance over Horus, and call his semen forth, but it answers from the river, invalidating his claim. Then, the gods listen to Horus' claim of having dominated Set, and call his semen forth, and it answers from inside Set. The association with an evil god such as Set reinforces the negativity towards all participants in homosexual relationships.

Some authors, however, have interpreted an at least more neutral message. In some versions, the act between Horus and Set was consensual, if improper, and Set's consumption of Horus' seed produced Thoth's lunar disc, thus being somewhat positive in outcome. Likewise, Set was not demonised until very late in Egyptian history, and the sexual act has been recorded since the first versions.

Human fertility, a major aspect of Egyptian mythology, often became intertwined with the crop fertility provided by the annual flooding of the river Nile. This connection appeared in the iconography of Nile-gods, such as Hapi, god of the Nile River, and Wadj-wer, god of the Nile Delta, who – although male – were depicted with female attributes such as pendulous breasts, symbolizing the fertility the river provides.

=== West African: Yoruba and Dahomean (Vodun) ===
The celestial creator deity of Dahomean religion is Mawu-Lisa, formed by a merger of the twin brother and sister gods Lisa (the moon) and Mawa (the sun). In combined form, they presented as intersex or transgender (with changing gender). Other androgynous gods include Nana Buluku, the "Great mother" that gave birth to Lisa and Mawu and created the universe, and contains both male and female essences.

The Akan people of Ghana have a pantheon of gods that includes personifications of the planets. These personifications manifest as androgynous or transgender deities, and include Abrao (Jupiter), Aku (Mercury), and Awo (Moon).

Possession by spirits is an integral part of Yoruba and other African religions. The possessed are usually women, but can also be men, and both genders are regarded as the "bride" of the deity while possessed. The language used to describe possession has a sexual and violent connotation but unlike in Yoruba-derived American religions, there is no link assumed between possession and homosexual or gender-variant activity in everyday life.

=== Zimbabwean ===
The mythology of the Shona people of Zimbabwe is ruled over by an androgynous creator god called Mwari, who occasionally splits into separate male and female aspects.

== Mythologies of Americas ==
=== Maya and Aztec ===
The Maya god Chin, reported from the sixteenth century, is said to have introduced homoeroticism into the Mayan culture and subsequently became associated with same-sex love. His example inspired noble families to purchase young men as lovers for their sons, creating legal relationships akin to marriage.

An important Mayan deity best known from the Classical period (200–900), the so-called Tonsured Maize God. The Classical Maya classified maize as masculine, but the Tonsured version of the Maize God is depicted in ancient Maya art as an effeminate young man associated with art and dance, was represented by queens on Maya stelae, and is thought to have constituted a third gender.

In the Codex Chimalpopoca, the male deity Tezcatlipoca and his alter ego sorcerer [necoc] Yāōtl "Enemies on Both Sides" once transformed themselves into women to copulate with Huemac.

Xōchipilli is an Aztec god seen as the patron of homosexuals and male prostitutes.

=== Native American and Inuit ===
In Inuit shamanism, the first two humans were Aakulujjuusi and Uumarnituq, both male. This same-sex couple desired company and decided to mate. This sexual encounter resulted in pregnancy for Uumarnituq. As he was physically not equipped to give birth, a spell was cast that changed his sex, giving him a vagina capable of passing the child. The now-female Uumarnituq was also responsible for introducing war into the world via magic, in order to curb overpopulation.

Many stories of Native Americans include Coyote seducing apparently lesbian couples, usually to his detriment. Other great spirits will sometimes take over a female body if no other presents itself when they wish to seduce a beautiful young woman.

=== Santería and Candomblé ===
Santería and Candomblé are syncretic religions derived from Yoruba diasporic beliefs and Catholicism, most prevalent in South Americas, including Cuba and Brazil. Their mythologies have many similarities to that of Yoruba, and contains a pantheon of Oríshas (spirits), comparable to (and often identified with) the lwa of Voodoo.

In one Cuban Santería "pataki", or mythological story, the sea goddess Yemaha is tricked into incestuous sex with her son Shango. To hide her shame at this event, she banished her other two sons, Inle and Abbata, to live at the bottom of the ocean, additionally cutting out Inle's tongue and making Abbata deaf. As a result of their isolation and loneliness, Inle and Abbata become passionate friends and then lovers, able to communicate empathically. This pataki is used to explain the origin of incest, muteness, and deafness in addition to homosexuality.

In Candomblé in Brazil there's Oxumaré, the rainbow serpent who is both male and female.

=== Haitian Vodou and Louisiana Voodoo ===
A large number of lwa (spirits or deities) exist in Haitian Vodou and Louisiana Voodoo. These lwa may be regarded as families of individuals or as a singular entity with distinct aspects, with links to particular areas of life.

Some lwa have particular links with magic, veneration of the dead or death such as the Gede and Bawon. A number of these are further particularly associated with transgender identities or same-sex interactions. These include Guede Nibo, a spirit caring for those who die young. He is sometimes depicted as an effeminate drag queen and inspires those he inhabits to lascivious sexuality of all kinds, especially transgender or lesbian behaviour in women. Gede Nibo's parents are Baron Samedi and Maman Brigitte; Baron Samedi is the leader of the Gede and Bawon and is depicted as bisexual dandy or occasionally transgender, wearing a top-hat and frock coat along with a woman's skirt and shoes. Samedi tends towards "lascivious movements" that cross gender boundaries and also imply a lust for anal sex.

Other bawon displaying gay behaviour are Baron Lundy and Baron Limba, who are lovers and teach a type of homoerotic nude wrestling at their school, believed to increase magical potency. Baron Oua Oua, who often manifests with a childlike aspect, has been called the baron "most closely linked to homosexuality" by Voodoo practitioners.

Another lwa, Erzulie, is associated with love, sensuality and beauty. Erzulie can manifest aspects that are LGBT-related, including transgender or Amazonian traits, in addition to traditionally feminine guises. When inhabiting men, these aspects can result in transgender or homoerotic behaviour, whereas they may result in lesbianism or anti-male sentiment in women. Erzulie Freda is seen as the protector of gay men, and Erzulie Dantor is associated with lesbians.

== Mexican folk religion ==
Santa Muerte is revered and seen as a saint and protector of the LGBT community in Mexico, since LGBTQ+ people are considered and treated as outcasts by the Catholic Church, evangelical churches, and Mexican society at large. Many LGBTQ+ people ask her for protection from violence, hatred, disease, and to help them in their search for love. Her intercession is commonly invoked in same-sex marriage ceremonies performed in Mexico. The now defunct Iglesia Católica Tradicional México-Estados Unidos, also known as the Church of Santa Muerte, recognized gay marriage and performed religious wedding ceremonies for homosexual couples.

== Mythologies of Asia ==
=== Chinese ===
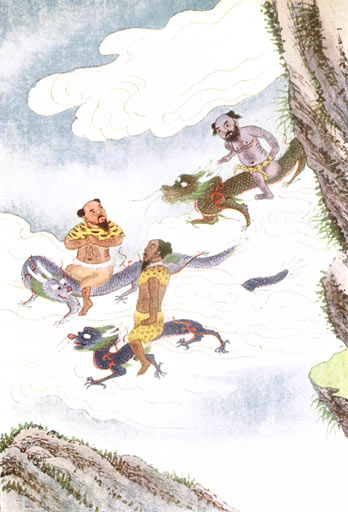
Dragon-gods, from Myths and Legends of China, 1922 by E. T. C. Werner. Dragons sometimes sexually assaulted older men.

Chinese mythology has been described as "rich in stories about homosexuality". The mythological stories and folklore of China reflect ancient Chinese perspectives toward homosexuality, rather than modern views. These myths are greatly influenced by religious beliefs, particularly Daoist and Confucian, and later incorporated Buddhist teachings.

The religion of the Shang and Predynastic Zhou were predominately shamanistic. Male same-sex love was believed to have originated in the mythical South, thus homosexuality is sometimes still called the "Southern wind". From this period, numerous spirits or deities were associated with homosexuality, bisexuality and transgender identities. These include Chou Wang, Lan Caihe, Shan Gu, and Yu the Great, and Gun.

Homosexual encounters are common in Chinese folk stories. The animal spirits or fairies often choose same-sex partners, usually young men or boys. According to the Xiaomingxiong, one exception to this age preference is the dragon, a powerful mythological beast. Chinese dragons "consistently enjoy sexual relationships with older men", one example being in the tale of "Old Farmer and a Dragon", in which a sixty-year-old farmer is forcibly sodomised by a passing dragon, resulting in wounds from penetration and bites that require medical attention.

Despite the later literature of some Daoist schools disapproval of homosexuality, Tu'er Shen is a deity in Chinese folklore who manages the love and sex between homosexual men. His name means "leveret deity". According to "The Tale of the Rabbit God" in the What the Master Would Not Discuss, Tu Er Shen was originally a man called Hu Tianbao, who fell in love with a handsome young imperial inspector of Fujian. One day Hu Tianbao was caught peeping on the inspector, at which point he confessed his reluctant affections for the other man. The imperial inspector had Hu Tianbao sentenced to death by beating. Since his crime was one of love, underworld officials decided to right the injustice by delegating Hu Tianbao as the god and safeguarder of homosexual affections.

In modern times, the priest Lu Weiming (盧威明) founded a temple in Yonghe City, Taiwan that worships Tu'er Shen and provides spiritual comfort for homosexual Daoists.

For thousands of years, male homosexuality was referred to in literature by alluding to two semi-legendary figures from the early Zhou dynasty. The first was Mizi Xia and the half-eaten peach which he shared with his lover, the actual historical figure, Duke Ling of Wey. The second was Lord Long Yang, who convinced an unnamed King of Wey to remain faithful to him by comparing himself to a small fish which the King might throw back if a larger fish came along. While both Mizi Xia and Lord Long Yang may have existed, nothing is known about them beyond their defining stories, and their presence in Chinese literature was very much that of legendary characters who served as archetypes of homosexual love.

=== Japanese ===
Shinto gods are involved in all aspects of life, including the practice of shudo (traditional pederasty). An overarching patron deity of male-male love and sex, "Shudō Daimyōjin", exists in some folk Shinto sects, but is not a part of the standard Shinto pantheon.

Other kami associated with same-sex love or gender variance include: Oyamakui, a transgender mountain spirit that protects industry and childbearing; and Inari Ōkami, the kami of agriculture and rice, who is depicted as various genders, the most common representations being a young female food goddess, an old man carrying rice, and an androgynous bodhisattva. Inari is further associated with foxes and kitsune, shapeshifting fox trickster spirits. Kitsune sometimes disguise themselves as women, hiding their true gender, to trick human men into sexual relations with them. A common belief in medieval Japan was that any woman encountered alone, especially at dusk or night, could be a fox.

==== Cross-dressing in Japanese Mythology ====
There is widespread agreement that cross-dressing of heroes and gods is widely observed in Japanese mythology. Through a woman dressed as a man or a man dressed as a woman, a double gender condition is created, gaining powerful power and divinity. Such beliefs existed in Japan before Westernization, according to Junko Mitsuhashi. Mitsuhashi calls this belief, Sōsei Genri (Japanese: 双性原理; no standard translation. lit. "the Double Gender Principle"). Yamato Takeru, the prince of Emperor Keikō, the hero of Japan's founding mythology, is cross-dressed and infiltrates the Kumaso's castle. He succeeded in killing the brave Kumaso Takeru. In Sankan Seibatsu, the mythical Japanese invasion of Korea, Empress Jingū dressed in a man and achieved stunning results. According to Mitsuhashi, these are examples of Sōsei Genri. Sōsei Genri can also be seen in the early modern fiction. For example, Inusaka Keno (Japanese: 犬坂毛野) and Inuzuka Shino (Japanese: 犬塚信乃), swordsmen in the Edo-period novel Nansō Satomi Hakkenden by Takizawa Bakin, are young men raised as a girl, but played superhuman activities to kill the enemy. Mitsuhashi considers that the cross-dressing of men seen at modern Japanese festivals originated from the ancient Sōsei Genri.

===== Yamato Takeru =====
Regarding Yamato Takeru's cross-dressing, it has had various views. Kojiki-den by Motoori Norinaga emphasized that it was a way to obtain the protection of Yamatohime-no-mikoto and more specifically Amaterasu, and most commentaries of Kojiki and historians such as Kazuo Higo supported Kojikiden's view. While Yū Mizuno acknowledged the spiritual power of the unmarried princess Yamatohime but argued that Amaterasu need not be taken into consideration, Kōjirō Naoki emphasized the spiritual dignity of Amaterasu and claimed that Yamatotakeru visited Ise Shrine. Toshihiko Moriya appealed to "common sense" and made the case for visiting Ise Shrine, but Mariko Hoshiyama was skeptical and saw the cross-dressing by Yamatotakeru as a part of the rites of coming-of-age. However, Sanae Fukutō points out that "a reexamination is now required" since the Kojiki and Nihon Shoki are entirely separate mythologies that should not be uncritically contrasted or compared.

====== Reincarnation into Yang Guifei ======
As a part of Shinkoku Shisō, Yamato Takeru's cross-dressing attracted attention in the Middle Ages. In Bai Juyi's Song of Everlasting Regret, there is a passage in which Emperor Xuanzong sees Yang Guifei's soul floating in Mount Penglai after her death. Japanese intellectuals identified Mount Penglai with Japan, and so they turned their attention to Bai Juyi's poetry. A setsuwa in the Keiranshūyōshū (渓嵐拾葉集) by Kōshu (光宗) identifies Yang Guifei's palace at Penglei with Atsuta Shrine in Japan. The Soga Monogatari states that Emperor Xuanzong also came to Japan after his death and became the god Hakkengū. In a Shinto theological book in 1523, Unshū Hinokawa Ame ga Uchi no Ki (雲州樋河上天淵記), Emperor Xuanzong planned to invade Japan in search of Yang Guifei, and it is said that the Japanese gods held a conference and had a god from Atsuta Shrine dress up as a woman and become Yang Guifei to calm Emperor Xuanzong's mind. Tōgoku Kikō (東国紀行) by Sōboku and Kiyohara Nobutaka also held this story in the Sengoku period. Edo period scholars such as Hayashi Razan (in Honchō Jinja-kō 本朝神社考, Tōkō Nichiroku 東行日録, Heishin Kikō 丙辰紀行), Matsushita Kenrin (in Ishō Nihonden) and Izawa Banryō (井沢蟠竜) criticized this as an ignorant theory, and it gradually fell out. A stupa dedicated to Yang Guifei was erected at Atsuta Shrine, but was removed during renovations during the Jōkyō era (1684-1688) but the stones, believed to have been fragments, can still be seen today.

===== Empress Jingū =====
Regarding Empress Jingū's cross-dressing, Shinobu Orikuchi understood it as a shamanic act, since warfare in ancient times was a divine ritual. He also pointed out that a similar example was the wife of the Asuka period warrior Kamitsukeno no Katana, who had dressed as a man and fought in the invasion against the Emishi. Hisashi Yamada shares a similar view, and believes that the example of armed Kikoe-ōgimi in Omoro Sōshi pointed out by Ifa Fuyū is also related to this cross-dressing.

あおりやへがふし

The song of Ōriyē

きこゑ大ぎみぎや、あけの、よろい、めしよわちへ、かたな、うちい、ぢやぐに、とよみよわれ

"Kikoe-ōgimi wears a red armour and fights with swords, which is why her fame resonates throughout this great kingdom."

又 とよむ せだかこが

"The supreme priestess, whose name resonates and who is filled with spiritual power! (repeat)"

又 月しろは、さだけて

"A god (月しろ) is the vanguard of Kikoe-ōgimi! (repeat)"

又 物しりは、さだけて

"A god (物しり) is the vanguard of Kikoe-ōgimi! (repeat)"

— Omoro Sōshi, Volume 1, Number 5

===== Susanoo =====
When Susanoo slays the dragon Yamata no Orochi, he wears the comb that Kushinadahime transformed into. Since combs symbolize women in ancient Japan, some have interpreted this as Susanoo cross-dressing. An early example is in The Tale of the Heike, written in the Middle Ages, which interprets Susanoo as cross-dressing. Takeo Kaneseki, Yoshiyuki Kojima, and Hayao Kawai have linked this attire of Susanoo to the cross-dressing Yamatotakeru. However, Shōichi Inoue claims that cross-dressing cannot be inferred from the act of wearing a comb.

八つの舟に酒をいれ、美女のすがたをつくッて、たかき岡にたつ.
"(Susanoo) filled eight barrels with sake, disguised himself as a beautiful woman, and stood on a high hill."

— The Tale of the Heike, Volume XI

==== Amaterasu's queerness ====
Amaterasu, the supreme deity in Japanese mythology and the imperial ancestor, is also called Ōhirume (ō-hiru-me; lit. "great-daylight-woman") and is generally known as a goddess. However, a lot of third gender interpretations have been performed since ancient times, so the pronoun here is they.

In ancient Japanese mythology, Amaterasu was surprised to see Susanoo ascending to Takamagahara, so they dressed as a man and armed themself. This is often thought to stem from Amaterasu's third gender shamanic nature.

Amaterasu retreats from conflict with their brother Susanoo into the cave of Amano-Iwato, depriving the Earth of sunlight and life. To coax Amaterasu from the cave, the deity of humour and dance, Ame-no-Uzume, performs a bawdy sexual dance that involved exposing her breasts and vulva. On Amaterasu's stepping out of the cave, Ishikori-dome no Mikoto held up a magical mirror, and the combination of the dance and their reflection distracted Amaterasu so much that they did not notice other deities closing the cave entrance behind them. In Japanese academia, Ame-no-Uzume's sexual dance has generally been understood to have a magical significance: an Edo period scholar Hirata Atsutane, for example, linked Ame-no-Uzume's genital exposure to genital folklore of the time. In the scene where the male god Ninigi-no-Mikoto descends to earth, Ame-no-Uzume similarly exposes her genitals and breasts. On the other hand, Conner, Sparks & Sparks (1998) is reading lesbianism in this story.

As seen above, Amaterasu is often noted for their gender variance or queerness. Already in the Heian period, Amaterasu was associated with cross-dressing or gender variance. Nakayama Tadachika's diary Sankaiki and Taira no Nobunori's diary Heihanki, written at the end of the Heian period, contain records of men's clothing being presented to Amaterasu at the Naikū of Ise Grand Shrine.

Medieval Shintoism offered esoteric interpretations of the ancient Japanese mythology. In many medieval sources, Amaterasu's gender is ambiguous and "confused". Nihongi ichi Jindaikan Shuibun (日本記一神代巻 取意文) in the early 15th century states that Amaterasu first appears as a man and is a god of yang, and sometimes as a woman and is a goddess of yin for the sake of enlightenment of the sentient beings. Tenchi Kanjōki (天地灌頂記) in 1568 states that Amaterasu at the Naikū of Ise Grand Shrine is female but resides in a male body, and that at Gekū is male but resides in a female body. Nichiiki Hongi (日諱貴本紀) in the Nanboku-chō period saw Amaterasu as physically androgynous, and of a gender variance, probably, "one that could not be determined as either a god or a goddess".^{:9} Furthermore, some medieval esoteric commentaries identify Kuni-no-Tokotachi with Konrin'ō (金輪王; a Chakravarti) and Rāgarāja (愛染明王 Aizen Myōō). Nichiiki Hongi, Daijingū Hon'en (大神宮本縁), and Nihongi Sanrin-ryū (日本記三輪流) consider Kuni-no-Tokotachi's spiritual essence to be an androgynous third gender.^{: 10—14} The third gender deities mentioned here, Amaterasu and Kuni-no-Tokotachi, are both regarded as supreme deities in Japanese panthea. According to Yui Yoshida, medieval esotericists considered Amaterasu, a third gender deity born from the marriage of the primordial brother and sister Izanagi and Izanami, to be more "complete" than Kuni-no-Tokotachi, a spontaneously generated third gender deity.^{: 22} In both Ise Shintō and Ryōbu Shintō, Amaterasu was associated with gender variance.^{: 125(20)} For example, Amaterasu is believed to have appeared in Hyūga as the boy deity Uhō Dōj in Ryōbu Shintō.

In the Edo period, Deguchi Nobutsune wrote in his Naikū Dantai Kōshō (内宮男体考証) that Amaterasu was female as a sun goddess and male as an imperial ancestor. Masuho Zankō, who advocated egalitarianism, used Amaterasu's androgynous nature as a basis for his argument on equality between men and women.

Amaterasu's gender variance or queer nature was retained in the early Meiji era. For instance, during the first years of the Meiji era, Emperor Meiji was the only male permitted to wear ohaguro. This was also recognized as cross-dressing by people at the time. Kei Chiba points out that in early modern Japan, ohaguro was a feminine grooming habit and may have signified a certain third gender nature of the emperor, the human deity and a descendant of Amaterasu.^{: 8} However, through the Meiji Restoration, Amaterasu's queer symbolization was eventually removed from the legitimacy and regarded as heresy. This elimination is also related to the fact that Amaterasu was sometimes used as a symbol of anti-government movements from the Edo period to the early Meiji era. For example, an uprising that occurred in Hokuetsu in 1874 used Amaterasu as a symbol and called for the restoration of the Tokugawa shogunate. Around 1885, Yohei Kobayashi (小林與平) started a social movement called Jindai Hukko Seigan Undō (神代復古請願運動), which called for a return to the pre-imperial era of myth, videlicet of Amaterasu. Kei Chiba argues that Amaterasu's queerness and dissident traits were an obstacle to the Meiji government's aims of Westernization and the emperor-centered family system of heteronormativity and patriarchy. The symbology of Amaterasu in ancient mythology was sometimes interpreted as cross-dressing, but ultimately their gender variance feature was "castrated" and they were "domesticated" under fascism as the supreme mother.

Even after the Meiji period, Amaterasu's gender variance continued to be believed in unorthodox new sects that was sometimes deemed heretical by the imperial government.^{: 12—13} Nao Deguchi, the originator of Oomoto-kyō, in their later years claimed that their soul is the same as that of Amaterasu's sister, and therefore that although their body is female (i.e. 変性男子; Henjōnansi), they are spiritually male. The shintai worshipped by the Jikōson's sect, which arose after the war and was banned by Supreme Commander for the Allied Powers, is considered as an androgynous deity that was a fusion of Emperor Jimmu and Amaterasu. Sayo Kitamura, the founder of Tenshō Kōtai Jingū-kyō, claimed that the god residing in her was a single deity embodied by the male deity Kōtaijin (皇大神) and the female deity Amaterasu.^{: 15—16}

==== Michiomi no Mikoto ====
Michiomi no Mikoto was the vanguard of the Jinmu's Eastern Expedition and also served as guards at the enthronement ceremony of Emperor Jimmu. He was appointed as a priest to worship Takamimusubi and given a woman's name Itsuhime (厳媛). Ryūzō Torii understood this as a change of sex, in other words, a kind of transgender shaman.

==== Shino no Hafuri and Amano no Hafuri ====
It has been suggested since the Edo period that the oldest recorded homosexual relationship in Japan was between Shino no Hōri/Hafuri (Japanese: 小竹祝) and Amano no Hōri/Hafuri (Japanese: 天野祝). These were priests (hōri) of different shrine, speculatively the sun goddess Amaterasu. When Shino died of illness, Amano committed suicide from grief, and the couple were buried together in the same grave.

According to Nihon Shoki, when Empress Jingū defeated the rebellion of Emperor Chūai's and Ōnakatsu Hime's son, prince Oshikuma, it became dark as night even though it was day. It was discovered that the cause of this strange phenomenon was the sin of azunai (阿豆那比之罪) committed by Shino and Amano. Although Nihon Shoki states that the sin of azunai was the sin of burying priests from two shrines in the same grave, homophobic Edo period researchers argued that the sin of azunai was a sin related to homosexuality.

=== Indian ===
==== Buddhist ====
In traditional Thai Buddhism, accounts propose that "homosexuality arises as a karmic consequence of violating Buddhist proscriptions against heterosexual misconduct" in a previous incarnation. Thai Buddhists also believe the disciple Ānanda to have been reincarnated several times as a woman, and in one previous life to have been transgender. Ānanda is popular and charismatic, and known for his emotionality. In one story of one of his previous lives, Ānanda was a solitary yogi who fell in love with a nāga, a serpent king of Indian folklore, who took the form of a handsome youth. The relationship became sexual, causing Ānanda to regretfully break off contact, to avoid distraction from spiritual matters.

According to one legend, male same-sex love was introduced into Japan by the founder of Shingon Buddhism, Kūkai. Historians point that this is probably not true, since Kūkai was an enthusiastic follower of monastic regulations.

Some bodhisattvas change sexes in different incarnations, which causes some to associate this with homosexuality and transgender identities. Guanyin, Avalokiteśvara, and Tara are known to have different gender representations.

==== Hindu ====
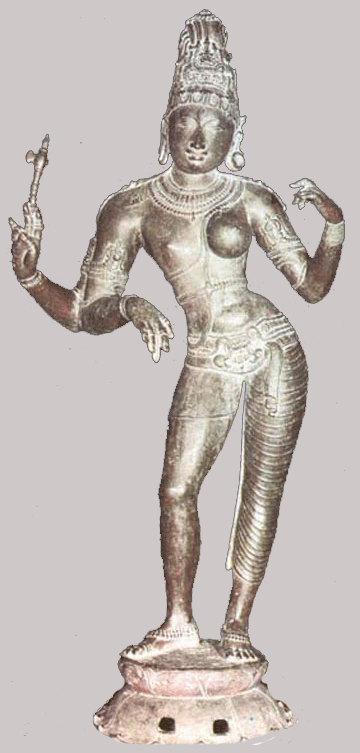
Shiva and Shakti in the form of Ardhanarisvara

""Hindu society had a clear cut idea of all these people in the past. Now that we have put them under one label 'LGBT', there is lot more confusion and other identities have got hidden."

— Gopi Shankar Madurai in National Queer Conference 2013

Hindu mythology has many examples of deities changing gender, manifesting as different genders at different times, or combining to form androgynous or hermaphroditic beings. Gods change sex or manifest as an Avatar of the opposite sex in order to facilitate sexual congress. Non-divine beings also undergo sex-changes through the actions of the gods, as the result of curses or blessings, or as the natural outcome of reincarnation.

Hindu mythology contains numerous incidents where sexual interactions serve a non-sexual, sacred purpose; in some cases, these are same-sex interactions. Sometimes the gods condemn these interactions but at other times they occur with their blessing.

In addition to stories of gender and sexual variance that are generally accepted by mainstream Hinduism, modern scholars and queer activists have highlighted LGBT themes in lesser known texts, or inferred them from stories that traditionally are considered to have no homoerotic subtext. Such analyses have caused disagreements about the true meaning of the ancient stories.

=== Philippines ===
In Tagalog mythology, the hermaphrodite Lakapati is identified as the most important fertility deity in the Tagalog pantheon. A prayer dedicated to Lakapati was recited by children when sowing seeds: "Lakapati, pakanin mo yaring alipin mo; huwag mong gutumin (Lakapati, feed this thy slave; let him not hunger)".

In Suludnon mythology, there are accounts of female binukots (well-kept maidens) who had powers to transition into male warriors. The most famous of which are Nagmalitong Yawa and Matan-ayon. In one epic, after Buyong Humadapnon was captured by the magical binukot Sinangkating Bulawan, the also powerful female binukot, Nagmalitong Yawa, cast her magic and transitioned into a male warrior named Buyong Sumasakay. He afterwards successfully rescued the warrior Buyong Humadapnon. In a similar epic, the female binukot Matan-ayon, in search of her husband Labaw Donggon, sailed the stormy seas using the golden ship Hulinday together with her less powerful brother-in-law Paubari. Once when she was bathing after sailing far, Buyong Pahagunong spotted her and tried to make her his bride. The event was followed by a series of combat, where in one instance, Matan-ayon transitioned into the male warrior Buyong Makalimpong. After a series of battles, Labaw Donggon arrives and attacks Buyong Pahagunong, while Buyong Makalimpong once again transitioned into Matan-ayon. Matan-ayon then has a conversation with the supreme goddess Laonsina about why the men are fighting and agree to sit back and watch them if they truly are seeking death.

In Waray mythology, the supreme creator deity has both female and male aspects. Usually spoken of in her female aspect, Malaon ("the ancient one"), she was regarded as a more sympathetic deity of justice and equality. However, her male aspect, Makapatag (literally "the leveler"), is regarded as a destructive deity of punishment and vengeance.

=== Abrahamic ===
==== Christian ====
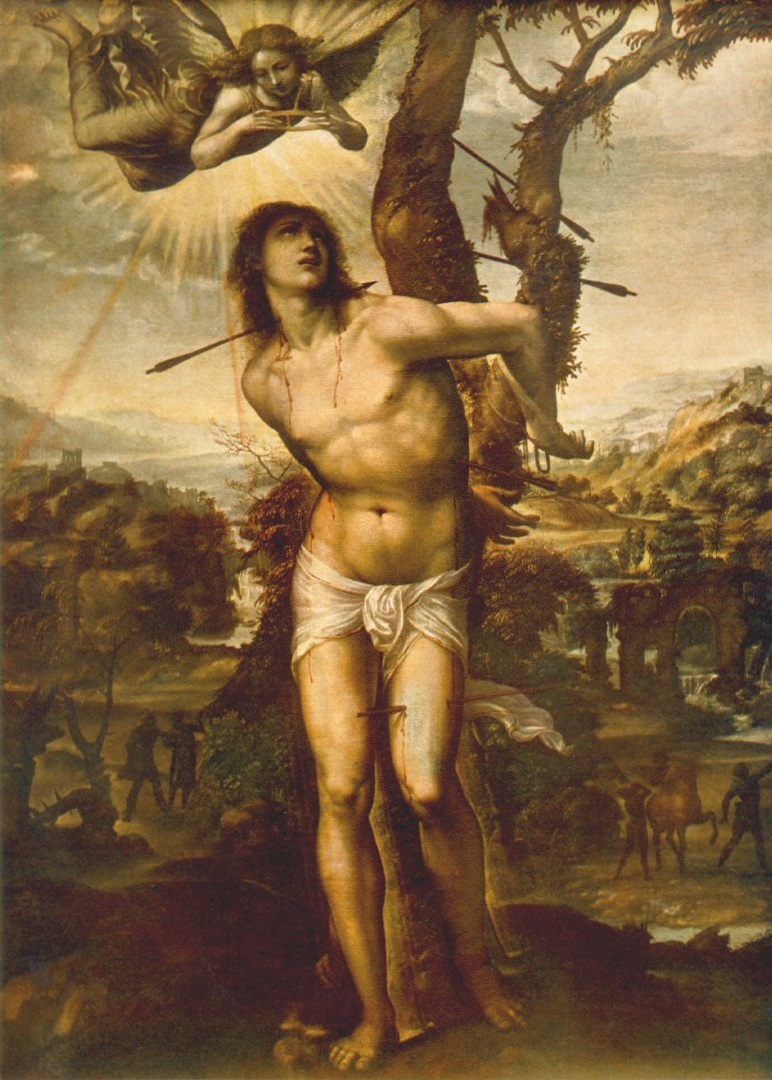
Saint Sebastian, history's first recorded LGBT icon

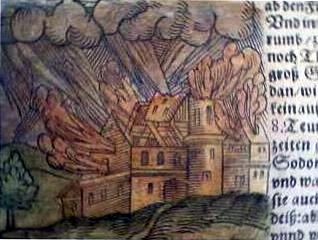
The destruction of Sodom as illustrated by Sebastian Münster (1564)

The saints Sergius and Bacchus' close relationship has led many modern commentators to believe they were lovers. The most popular evidence for this view is that the oldest text of their martyrology, in the Greek language, describes them as erastai (Koine Greek: ἐρᾰσταί, romanized: erastaí, lit. 'lovers'. Historian John Boswell considered their relationship to be an example of an early Christian same-sex union, reflecting his contested view of tolerant early Christian attitudes toward homosexuality.

The official stance of the Eastern Orthodox Church is that the ancient Eastern tradition of adelphopoiesis, which was done to form a "brotherhood" in the name of God and is traditionally associated with these two saints, had no sexual implications.

Mark D. Jordan writes that stories involving paired male saints are often portrayed as examples of heroic brotherly love. He argues that these stories can be interpreted as extolling the virtues of male friendships, but alternatively as suggestions of homoerotic feelings.

Saint Sebastian is a long-standing gay icon. The combination of his strong, shirtless physique, the symbolism of the arrows penetrating his body, and the look on his face of rapturous pain have intrigued artists (gay or otherwise) for centuries, and began the first explicitly gay cult in the 19th century. Richard A. Kaye wrote, "contemporary gay men have seen in Sebastian at once a stunning advertisement for homosexual desire (indeed, a homoerotic ideal), and a prototypical portrait of tortured closet case."

==== Islamic and Pre-Islamic Arabian ====
Islamic folk beliefs remain common, such as the myths surrounding the jinn, long-lived shape-shifting spirits created from "smokeless fire" (Quran 15:27) and which correspond to the second group of angels who were created on the fifth day of Creation in the text of Jewish Kabbalah called the Bahir "Illumination", which were created from "flameless fire". Some believe their shape-shifting abilities allow them to change gender at will but this is not consistent throughout the Islamic world although their ability to fly and travel exceedingly fast are consistent traits of the Jinn. The word Jinn means "hidden from sight" and they are sometimes considered to be led by Iblis, representing powers of magic and rebellion, and posing as bringers of wealth as the devil acclaim.

These traits are associated with the Jinn on account of Iblis' rebellion against the order of God to acknowledge Adam's ability to be superior to the Jinn and his refusal to bow down stating that "he was created from fire and Adam was created from clay" (Quran 7:11-12). The ability of the Jinn to travel to the heavens and listen to the discussion of angels and bring back what they overhear and relay it to seers and oracles has linked them with magic (Quran 72:8-10).

Jinn are served by the al-Jink and mukhannathun, transgender and homoerotically inclined wanderers with entertainment and spiritual functions. In pre-Islamic Arabic and Oikoumene cultures, third-gender individuals such as mukhannathun were worshippers in widespread goddess cults. These cults revered a trio of goddesses: al-lāt, al-Uzza, and Manāt. which in pre-Islamic Arabia were believed to be daughters of God but were denounced as false idols in Quran 53:19-23.

Arabian mythology also contains magical sex-changing springs or fountains, such as al-Zahra. Upon bathing in or drinking from al-Zahra, a person will change sex. The folklore of Swat in northern Pakistan often includes same-sex relationships in which the "beloved" is a handsome younger man or boy.

==== Judaism ====
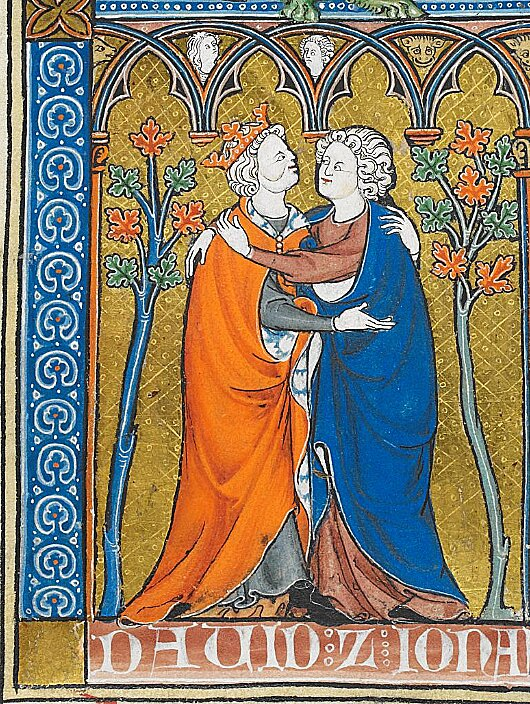
David and Jonathan in "La Somme le Roy" (1290 CE)

The story of David and Jonathan has been described as "biblical Judeo-Christianity's most influential justification of homoerotic love". The relationship between David and Jonathan is mainly covered in the Hebrew Bible in the 1st Book of Samuel as part of the story of David's ascent to power. The mainstream view found in modern biblical exegesis argues that the relationship between the two is merely a close platonic friendship. However, there has recently been a tradition of interpreting the love between David and Jonathan as romantic or sexual.

Another biblical hero, Noah, best known for his building an ark to save animals and worthy people from a divinely-caused flood, later became a wine-maker. One day he drank too much wine and fell asleep naked in his tent. When his son Ham enters the tent, he sees his father naked, and Canaan, one of Ham's sons is cursed with banishment. In Jewish tradition, it is also suggested that Ham had anal sex with Noah or castrated him.

=== Mesopotamian: Sumerian, Akkadian, Babylonian, Assyrian, Phoenician, and Canaanite ===
The ancient regions of Mesopotamia and Canaan were inhabited by a succession of overlapping civilisations: Sumer, Phoenicia, Agade, Babylonia, and Assyria. The mythologies of these people were interlinked, often containing the same stories and mythological gods and heroes under different names.

The Eridu Genesis, "The Creation of Man", from circa the 20th century BC, lists physically differing people created by the goddess Ninmah. (Note: Ninmah (Sumerian: "Great Queen") has many names, and is identified with Ninhursag (Sumerian: "Lady of the mountain"), Nintu (Akkadian: "Lady of Birth"), Belet-ili (Babylonian: Lady of the gods), Aruru, Mami, Mamma. (Dalley 1998, p. 326)) These included "the woman who cannot give birth" and "the one who has no male organ or female organ", which have been regarded as being third gender or androgynous. Enki, the supreme god, is accepting of these people and assigns them roles in society as naditu (priestesses) and girsequ (servants to the king).

The Akkadian mythical epic Atrahasis contains another iteration of this story in which Enki specifically requests that Nintu create a "third-category" of people that includes third-gender people, barren women, and an "infant-stealing demon".

In ancient Mesopotamia, worship of the goddess Inanna included "soothing laments" sung by third-gender priests called "gala". (Note: Inanna (Sumerian) is identified with Ishtar (Babylonian), Astarte (Phoenician), Atargatis (Syrian) and in later texts Aphrodite (Greek).) According to First Babylonian dynastic texts, these priests were created specifically for this purpose by the god Enki. Some gala took female names, and the word itself means "penis+anus", hinting at their androgynous status. The cultural practice, or "me", of androgynous, third-gender or homoerotically inclined priests were part of those said to have been stolen by Innana from Enki in "The Descent of Innana" myth. In the Babylonian Erra myth, the gender of the "kurgaru" and "assinnu" priests was supernaturally changed by the goddess Ishtar, making them feminine. The changes may also facilitate possession by the goddess, causing a psychological change or prompting physical castration.

The relationship between the semi-divine hero Gilgamesh and his "intimate companion" Enkidu in the Sumerian Epic of Gilgamesh has been interpreted as a sexual one by some modern scholars. Enkidu was created as a companion to Gilgamesh by the goddess Aruru, and civilised by a priestess. As Gilgamesh and Enkidu were of similar ages and status, their relationship has been seen as relatively egalitarian, in contrast with the typically pederastic mode of ancient Greece.

=== Zoroastrianism ===
Zoroastrianism has been said to have a "hatred of male anal intercourse". This is reflected in its mythology: When Ahriman, the "Spirit of Aridity and Death" and "Lord of Lies", seeks to destroy the world, he engages in self-sodomy. This homosexual self-intercourse causes an "explosion of evil power" and results in the birth of a host of evil minions and demons. Ahriman has also been regarded as the patron of men who partake of homosexual sex. However, this negative portrayal of homosexuality in Zoroastrianism is not found in the Gathas, their original holy book which is said to be the direct sayings of the prophet Zoroaster.

== Mythologies of Europe ==
=== Celtic ===
Celtic mythology has no known stories of gay or lesbian relationships nor LGBT characters. Peter Chicheri argues that non-procreative sexual experiences were removed from myths by Christians.

Conner, Sparks & Sparks (1998) suggest that the heroes and foster-brothers Cúchulainn and Ferdiadh may have had a sexual relationship. The tale has led to comparisons to Greek "warrior-lovers", and Cúchulainn's reaction to the death of Ferdiadh in particular compared to Achilles' lament for Patroclus.

Bodhmall and Liath Luachra were Fionn mac Cumhaill's foster-mothers who lived togeather on the Slieve Bloom Mountains. They have been speculated to be a couple, which was not unusual in early Irish celtic society.

In the Fourth Branch of the Mabinogi of Welsh mythology, Gwydion helps his brother Gilfaethwy rape Goewin, Math's female servant. When Math hears of this, he turns his nephews into a series of mated pairs of animals; Gwydion becomes a stag for a year, then a sow, and finally a wolf. Gilfaethwy becomes a hind, a wild boar, and a she-wolf. Each year they must mate and produce an offspring which is sent to Math: Hyddwn, Hychddwn and Bleiddwn; after three years Math releases his nephews from their punishment.

In the Matter of Britain, originating in Welsh mythology, the Knights of the Round Table, Lancelot and Galehaut, share intimacy as recounted in the 13th century Lancelot-Grail. The nature of their relationship is a subject of debate among modern scholars, with some interpreting it as intimate friendship and others as love similar to that between Lancelot and Guinevere.

The 14th-century chivalric romance Sir Gawain and the Green Knight is considered by some modern scholars to blur the line between male homosociality common at the time and male homosexuality. The Green Knight's attractiveness defies the homosocial rules of King Arthur's court and poses a threat to their way of life, with the friendship between him and Gawain being seen with homoerotic overtones.

=== Greek and Roman ===
Greek mythology features male same-sex love in many of the constituent myths. These myths have been described as being crucially influential on Western LGBT literature, with the original myths being constantly re-published and re-written, and the relationships and characters serving as icons. In comparison, lesbianism is rarely found in classical myths.

- Achilles and Antilochus
- Achilles and Patroclus
- Achilles and Troilus
- Agamemnon and Argynnus
- Ameinias and Narcissus
- Apollo and Admetus
- Apollo and Adonis
- Apollo and Boreas
- Apollo and Branchus
- Apollo and Carnus
- Apollo and Cyparissus
- Apollo and Helenus
- Apollo and Hyacinthus
- Apollo and Hymenaios
- Apollo and Iapis
- Ares and Alectryon
- Artemis and Callisto
- Asclepius and Hippolytus
- Athena and Myrmex
- Athis and Lycabas
- Boreas and Hyacinthus
- Cephalus and Pterelaus
- Chiron and Dionysus
- Cleostratus and Menestratus
- Cycnus and Phaethon
- Cycnus and Phylius
- Cydon and Clytius
- Deiphobus and Antheus
- Dionysus and Ampelus
- Dionysus and Prosymnus
- Eurybarus and Alcyoneus
- Euxynthetus and Leucocomas
- Helios and Nerites
- Hephaestus and Peleus
- Heracles and Abderus
- Heracles and Diomus
- Heracles and Eurystheus
- Heracles and Hylas
- Heracles and Iolaus
- Hermes and Amphion
- Hermes and Crocus
- Hermes and Perseus
- Hermes and Pollux
- Hesperus and Hymenaeus
- Hymenaeus and Argynnus
- Hypnos and Endymion
- Ianthe and Iphis
- Kalamos and Karpos
- Laius and Chrysippus
- Marsyas and Olympus
- Meles and Timagoras
- Minos and Atymnius
- Minos and Ganymede
- Minos and Miletus
- Minos and Theseus
- Nisus and Euryalus
- Orestes and Pylades
- Orpheus and the Thracians
- Orpheus and Kalais
- Pan and Daphnis
- Paris and Antheus
- Polyphemus and Silenus
- Poseidon and Nerites
- Poseidon and Pelops
- Polyeidos and Glaucus
- Rhadamanthus and Talos
- Sarpedon and Atymnius
- Sarpedon and Miletus
- Silvanus and Cyparissus
- Tantalus and Ganymede
- Thamyris and Hyacinthus
- Theseus and Pirithous
- Zephyrus and Cyparissus
- Zephyrus and Hyacinthus
- Zeus and Aëtos
- Zeus (Artemis) and Callisto
- Zeus and Euphorion
- Zeus and Ganymede

Apollo, an eternal beardless youth himself, had the most male lovers of all the Greek gods, as could be expected from a god who presided over the palaestra. In spite of having no male lovers himself, the love god Eros was sometimes considered patron of pederastic love between males. Aphroditus was an androgynous Aphrodite from Cyprus, in later mythology became known as Hermaphroditus the son of Hermes and Aphrodite.

Thamyris, the Thracian singer who developed love for Hyacinthus, is said to have been the first man to fall in love with another man. In Ovid's Metamorphoses, the characters Iphis and Caeneus change sex.

Antinous (c. 111 – c. 130) was a Greek youth from Bithynia and a favourite and lover of the Roman emperor Hadrian. Following his premature death before his 20th birthday, Antinous was deified on Hadrian's orders, being worshipped in both the Greek East and Latin West, sometimes as a god and sometimes merely as a hero.

=== Norse ===
Georges Dumézil suggested that Freyr, a Norse god of fertility, may have been worshiped by a group of homosexual or effeminate priests, as suggested by Saxo Grammaticus in his Gesta Danorum.

Some Old Norse deities are attested as changing their shape at will, turning into animals or otherwise disguising themselves. For example, the god Loki is attested as disgusing himself as a woman. In Gylfaginning, he transforms himself into a mare and, after being chased all night by a stallion Svaðilfari, he gives birth to Sleipnir, an eight-legged foal.

Norwegian archaeologist Brit Solli suggests that Odin may have been connected to a shamanistic cult that viewed gender transgression as a source of power.

According to socialist David F. Greenberg:

at first...stigmatization did not extend to active male homosexuality. To take revenge on the disloyal priest Bjorn and his mistress Thorunnr in the Gudmundar Saga "it was decided to put Thorunnr into bed with every buffoon, and to do that to Bjorn the priest, which was considered no less dishonorable." Dishonorable to Bjorn, not to his rapists. In the Edda, Sinfjotli insults Gudmundr by asserting that "all the einherjar (Odin's warriors in Valhalla) fought with each other to win the love of Gudmundr (who was male)." Certainly he intended no aspersions on the honor of the einherjar. Then Sinfjotli boasts that "Gundmundr was pregnant with nine wolf cubs and that he, Sinfjotli, was the father." Had the active, male homosexual role been stigmatized, Sinfjotli would hardly have boasted of it.

== Mythologies of Oceania ==
=== Australian Aboriginal ===
The indigenous population of Australia have a shamanistic religion, which includes a pantheon of gods. The Rainbow Serpent of the Wunambal known as Ungud has been described as androgynous or transgender. Clever men identify their erect penises with Ungud and his androgyny inspires some to undergo ceremonial subincision of the penis. Angamunggi is another transgender rainbow-serpent god, worshipped as a "giver of life".

Other Australian mythological beings include Labarindja, blue-skinned wild women or "demon women" with hair the colour of smoke. Stories about them show them to be completely uninterested in romance or sex with men, and any man forcing his attention upon them could die, due to the "evil magic in their vaginas". They are sometimes depicted as gynandrous or intersex, having both a penis and a vagina. This is represented in ritual by having their part played by men in women's clothes.

=== Pacific Island: Celebes, Vanuatu, Borneo and the Philippines ===
Third gender, or gender variant, spiritual intermediaries are found in many Pacific island cultures, including religion in pre-colonial Philippines, such as the bajasa of the Torajan people of Sulawesi, the bantut of the Tausūg people of the south Philippines, and the bayogin. These shamans are typically biologically male but display feminine behaviours and appearance. The pre-Christian Philippines had a polytheistic religion, which included the transgender or hermaphroditic gods Bathala and Malyari, whose names means "Man and Woman in One" and "Powerful One" respectively; these gods are worshipped by the Bayagoin.

The Big Nambas of Vanuatu have the concept of divinely approved homoerotic relationships between men, with the older partner called the dubut. This name is derived from the word for shark, referring to the patronage of the shark-human hydrid creator god Qat.

Among their pantheon of deities, the Ngaju of Borneo worship Mahatala-Jata, an androgynous or transgender god. The male part of this god is Mahatala, who rules the Upperworld, and is depicted as a hornbill living above the clouds on a mountain-top; the female part is Jata, who rules the Underworld from under the sea in the form of a katuali. These two manifestations are linked via a jewel-encrusted bridge that is seen in the physical world as a rainbow. Mahatala-Jata is served by balian, female hierodules, and basir, transgender shamans metaphorically described as "water snakes which are at the same time hornbills".

Similar transgender shamans, the "manang bali", are found in the Iban. Girls fated to become manang bali may first dream of becoming a woman and also of being summoned by the deities Menjaya Raja Manang or Ini. Menjaya Raja Manang began existence as a male god until the wife of her brother Sengalang Burong became sick. This prompted Menjara to become the world's first healer, allowing her to cure her sister-in-law, but this treatment also resulted in Menjara changing into a woman or androgynous being.

=== Polynesian: Hawaiian and Māori ===
Polynesian religions feature a complex pantheon of deities. Many of these gods refer to their companions of either sex as "aikane", a term encompassing passionate friendship and sexual-love, often in bisexual contexts.

Wahine-ʻŌmaʻo, a goddess of Hawaiian religion whose name means "ʻŌmaʻo woman", is depicted in relationships with other goddesses Hiʻiaka and Hopoe. When Hiʻiaka was suspected of infidelity with her sister Pele's husband, the volcano goddess Pele killed Hiʻiaka's beloved Hopoe by covering her in lava. In addition to Wahineomo and Hopoe, Hiʻiaka had sapphic relationships with the fern goddess Pauopalae and Pele-devotee Omeo. Omeo was part of the retinue that brought the bisexual Prince Lohiau to Pele after his death. During his life Lohiau was the lover of both the female Pele and male Paoa.

Other Polynesian LGBT figures include the Hawaiian Haakauilanani, a male servant and lover to the "Earth mother" creator goddess Papahānaumoku and her husband Wākea. Non-divine LGBT characters also exist in Polynesian mythology, such as the male priest Pakaʻa and his chief and lover Keawe-nui-a-ʻUmi, and the famed fisherman Nihooleki, who was married to a woman but also had a relationship with the pig god Kamapuaʻa. Kamapua'a was also responsible for sending the love-god Lonoikiaweawealoha to seduce Pele's brother gods Hiiakaluna and Hiiakalalo, hence distracting them from attacking him. Kamapuaʻa's other male lovers included Limaloa, the bisexual god of the sea and mirages.

Hiʻiaka, a daughter or sister of Pele, had aikane (from: "ai", meaning: [intimate sexual relationship]; kane, [man, husband, consort]) relationships with several female lovers including Hopoe, Omeo, Wahineʻomaʻo, and Pauo-Palae.

The Healing Stones of Kapaemahu tells the story of four māhū - individuals of dual male and female mind, heart, and spirit - who long ago brought healing arts from Tahiti to Hawaiʻi. Before they left, they used special dual male-female kiʻi to transfer their powers to four large boulders that the people brought to Waikiki. These stones still exist on Waikiki Beach and may be the only monument in the world to honor and uplift gender fluidity.

== See also ==
- Religion and homosexuality
- Queer theology
- LGBT literature
- LGBT history
- LGBT themes in speculative fiction
