= Euthymus of Locri =

An Ancient Greek Olympic boxer who became a mythological hero

Euthymus or Euthymos of Locri (Ancient Greek: Εὔθυμος) appears in ancient tradition as both a celebrated Olympic boxer and a figure who blends into myth. Ancient sources present him not only as an Olympic champion but also as a man who confronted a spirit in Temesa.

== Early life ==
Euthymus was from the region near the headland called Zephyrion, and he was said to be the son of Astycles. However, local tradition also gives him a mythic origin: he is said to be the son of the river Caecinus, which separates Locris from the land of Rhegium.

Claudius Aelianus writes he was known for his extraordinary strength. The people of Locri pointed to a huge stone that he supposedly lifted and carried to place in front of his house.

== Olympic career ==
At one Olympic Games, Theagenes of Thasos entered both the boxing and pankration competitions at the same Olympiad. In the boxing contest, he defeated Euthymus, but the bout was so demanding that he was left exhausted and lacked the strength to win the pankration competition later in the festival. The Hellanodikai (Olympic judges) subsequently ruled that Theagenes had entered the boxing competition not out of a genuine desire to compete for the title, but merely to deprive Euthymus of victory. As punishment, they imposed a fine of one talent to be dedicated to Zeus and a further talent for the harm done to Euthymus. In addition, Theagenes was required to make a separate private payment to Euthymus as compensation.

At the following Olympic Festival, Theagenes paid the fine owed to the god and, as compensation to Euthymus, did not enter the boxing competition. Euthymus won the Olympic boxing competition.

Euthymus won the Olympic boxing title three times, at the 74th, 76th, and 77th Olympiads. His defeat by Theagenes of Thasos was during the 75th Olympiad. His successes established his reputation as one of the most distinguished victors of his time.

== Statues ==
His statue at Olympia was made by Pythagoras of Rhegium and was regarded as very worth seeing.

Pliny the Elder states that Callimachus recorded an extraordinary event. A statue of Euthymus located in Locri and the statue of Euthymus at Olympia were both struck by lightning on the same day.

== Divinization ==
Pliny the Elder states that, by the command of the Delphic oracle and with the approval of Zeus, Euthymus was declared a sacred hero or divine figure while he was still alive and fully aware of this honor. Pliny further relates that the oracle ordered sacrifices to be offered to Euthymus, and these sacrifices were performed repeatedly both during his lifetime and after his death.

== Myth (Against the Hero of Temesa) ==
Euthymus is also connected to a local myth from Temesa in Italy.

=== Suda ===
According to the Suda, the city was said to be haunted by a violent spirit of a dead man, named Alybas. The story goes that Odysseus, in his wanderings after the capture of Troy, came to Temesa in Italy near Sicily. There, one of his sailors became drunk, raped a maiden, and was stoned to death by the local people. Odysseus paid no attention to the loss and sailed away. The spirit of the dead man did not leave the people of Temesa in peace. It came out against them and killed them, so that they were ready to abandon their city and flee. The Pythian Oracle ordered them not to leave, but to propitiate the hero by building a sanctuary and giving him each year the most beautiful virgin as a wife.

Euthymus, learning that these rites had been carried out for many years, entered the sanctuary. Seeing the girl, he pitied her and also fell into desire for her. He armed himself and prepared to fight the spirit. When the spirit came at night, Euthymus defeated it in combat and drove it away so that it no longer appeared there. After this, Euthymus married the girl.

=== Claudius Aelianus ===
Claudius Aelianus writes that Euthymus defeated the Hero in Temesa, that haunted Temesa and demanded tribute from the local inhabitants. Euthymus entered the spirit's temple, a place that most people could not approach, and fought it. He forced the spirit to surrender more wealth than it had taken from others. This story gave rise to a proverb: when someone acquires something that turns out to be useless or brings no benefit, people would say, "The Hero of Temesa has come to him."

The story goes on to say that Euthymus later went down to the River Caecinus, which flowed near the city of the Locrians, and was never seen again.

=== Pausanias ===
Pausanias writes that Odysseus was driven by storms to Temesa during his wanderings after the fall of Troy. One of his sailors became drunk and violated a local maiden. For this crime, the inhabitants stoned him to death. Odysseus, however, showed no concern for the sailor's fate and departed with his fleet. The spirit of the slain sailor thereafter haunted Temesa, attacking and killing the inhabitants without distinction of age. The terror became so severe that the people resolved to abandon the city altogether. When they consulted the Delphic oracle, they were instructed to remain in Temesa, establish a sacred precinct and temple for the dead man, and appease him with annual offerings. They were further commanded to give him each year the fairest maiden of the city as a bride. After obeying these instructions, the people were no longer troubled by the spirit's attacks.

Euthymus arrived at Temesa while one of these offerings was being prepared. Learning the reason for the ceremony, he insisted on entering the sanctuary and seeing the maiden who had been selected. At first he felt pity for her and afterwards fell in love with her. The girl promised that she would marry him if he could save her. Euthymus then armed himself and waited for the spirit's appearance. When the spirit came, Euthymus engaged it in combat and defeated it. The ghost was driven from the land and vanished by plunging into the sea. As a result, the inhabitants of Temesa were permanently freed from the tribute and the terror that had afflicted them. Euthymus subsequently married the rescued maiden and celebrated a distinguished wedding. Pausanias also records another tradition according to which Euthymus lived to an extraordinary old age and eventually departed from the world in a mysterious manner rather than dying a normal death.

Pausanias further reports having seen a copy of an ancient painting depicting the event. The painting included figures identified as the youth Sybaris, the river Calabrus, the spring Lyca, a hero-shrine, and the city of Temesa. In the center was the spirit defeated by Euthymus. The figure was portrayed as terrifying in appearance, black in color, and clothed in a wolf skin. An inscription in the painting identified the spirit as Lycas.

Some modern scholars argue that this figure belongs among the werewolf figures of ancient Greek tradition.

=== Strabo ===
According to Strabo, there was also a different version of the myth.

Polites, a companion of Odysseus, is said to have been treacherously murdered by the inhabitants of Temesa. Because of his violent death, he becomes a wrathful hero whose spirit haunted the region. According to an oracle, the people of the area were required to offer him regular tribute, and his relentless demands became proverbial: merciless people were said to be "beset by the hero of Temesa." The hero was honored at a sanctuary near the city, situated in a grove of wild olive trees. After the Epizephyrian Locrians take control of the city, Euthymus confronts Polites, engages him in combat, defeats him, and thereby freed the inhabitants from the tribute.

== See also ==
Other tales of a hero slaying a monster to save a love interest in Greek legend and mythology:

- Perseus and Andromeda
- Heracles and Hesione
- Menestratus and Cleostratus
- Eurybarus and Alcyoneus
