= Damsel in distress =

Trope and stock character in storytelling

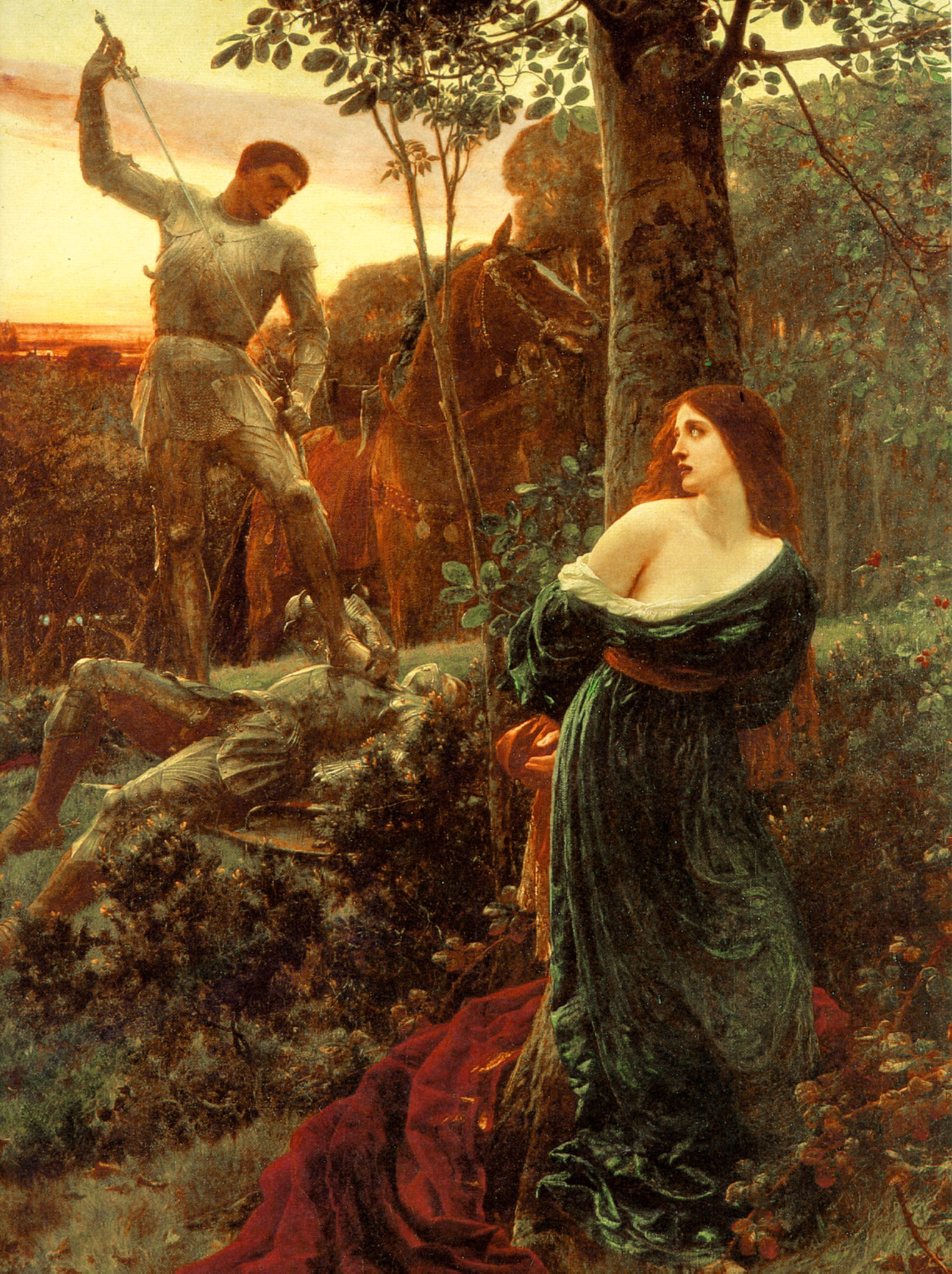
Frank Bernard Dicksee's 1885 painting Chivalry

The damsel in distress is a narrative device in which one or more men must rescue a woman who has been kidnapped or placed in other peril. The "damsel" is often portrayed as beautiful, popular, and of high social status; she is usually depicted as a princess in works with fantasy or fairy tale settings. Kinship, love, lust or a combination of those motivate the male protagonist to initiate the narrative, and potentially become a hero of valour.

Critics have linked the helplessness of these women to societal views that women as a group need to be taken care of by men and treated nicely. Throughout the history of the trope, the role of the woman as the victim in need of a male savior has remained constant, but her attackers have changed to suit the tastes and collective fears of the period: "monsters, mad scientists, Nazis, hippies, bikers, aliens, etc."

== Etymology ==
The word damsel derives from the French demoiselle, meaning 'young lady', and the term damsel in distress in turn is a translation of the French demoiselle en détresse. It is an archaic term not used in modern English except for effect or in expressions such as this. It can be traced back to the knight-errant of Medieval songs and tales, who regarded protection of women as an essential part of the chivalric code, which includes a notion of honour and nobility. The English term damsel in distress itself first seems to have appeared in Richard Ames's 1692 poem "Sylvia's Complaint of Her Sexes Unhappiness".

== History ==
=== Ancient history ===
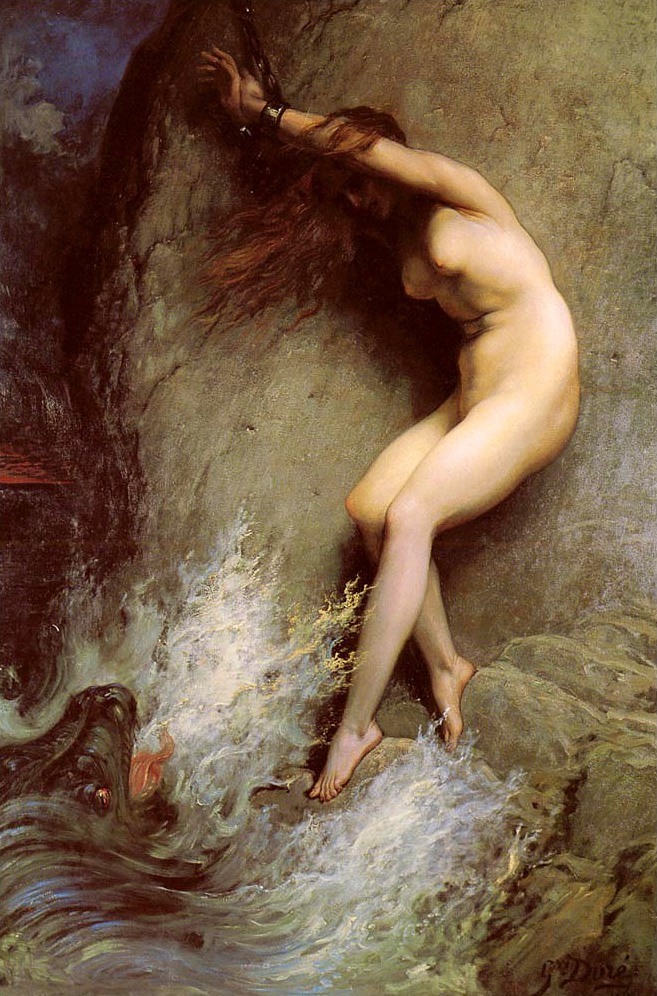
Gustave Doré's depiction of Andromeda chained to the rock—a Romantic-era portrayal of the damsel in distress from Greek mythology

The damsel in distress theme featured in ancient mythology. Greek mythology, while featuring a large retinue of competent goddesses, also contains helpless maidens threatened with human sacrifice. For example, Andromeda's mother offended the Nereids and Poseidon, who sent a beast to ravage the land. To appease him Andromeda's parents fastened her to a rock in the sea. The hero Perseus slew the beast, saving Andromeda. Andromeda in her plight, chained naked to a rock, became a favorite theme of later painters. This theme of the princess and dragon is also pursued in the myth of Saint George. The homosexual variant is also present in the stories of Cleostratus and Alcyoneus, youths who are to be sacrificed to man-eating serpentine monsters before they are saved by their love interests Menestratus and Eurybarus respectively.

In ancient Indian mythology, the damsel in distress theme is featured in the epics Ramayana and Mahabharata. In the Ramayana, Sita is kidnapped by Ravana, leading to Rama and Hanuman embarking on a journey to rescue her. In the Mahabharata, Draupadi is abused by Duryodhana, motivating the Pandava brothers to seek revenge.

=== Post-classical history ===
European fairy tales frequently feature damsels in distress. Evil witches trapped Rapunzel in a tower, cursed Snow White to die in Snow White, and put the princess into a magical sleep in Sleeping Beauty. In all of these, a valorous prince comes to the maiden's aid, saves her, and marries her (though Rapunzel is not directly saved by the prince, but instead saves him from blindness after her exile).

The damsel in distress was an archetypal character of medieval romances, where typically she was rescued from imprisonment in a tower of a castle by a knight-errant. Geoffrey Chaucer's The Clerk's Tale of the repeated trials and bizarre torments of patient Griselda was drawn from Petrarch. The Emprise de l'Escu vert à la Dame Blanche (founded 1399) was a chivalric order with the express purpose of protecting oppressed ladies.

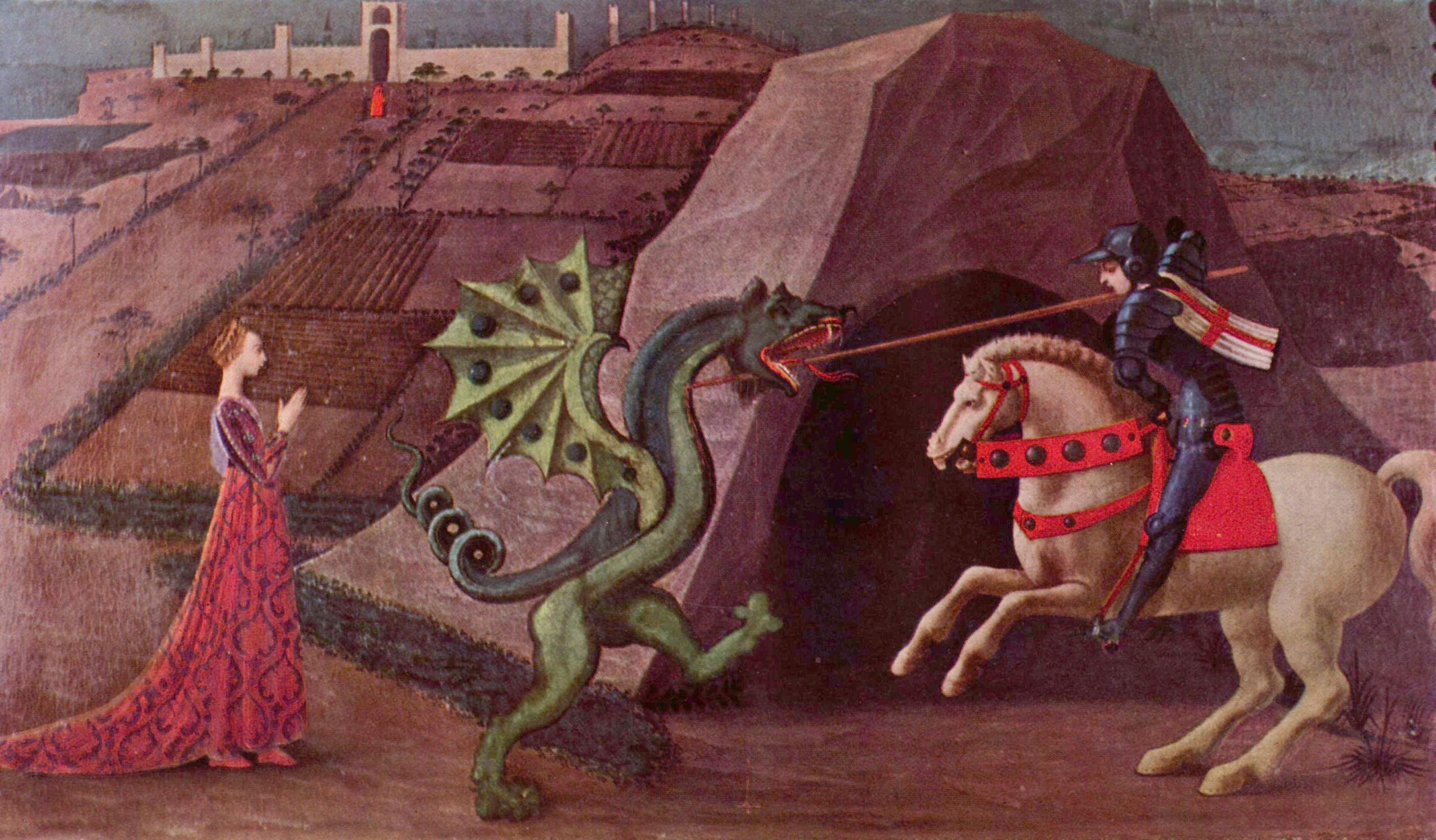
Paolo Uccello's depiction of Saint George and the dragon, c. 1470, a classic image of a damsel in distress

The theme also features in the medieval legend of Saint George who saved a princess from being devoured by a dragon. A late addition to this saint's hagiography, not attested in the several first centuries when he was venerated, it is nowadays the main act for which Saint George is remembered.

Obscure outside Norway is Hallvard Vebjørnsson, the Patron Saint of Oslo, recognised as a martyr after being killed while valiantly trying to defend a woman—most likely a slave—from three men accusing her of theft.

=== Modern history ===
==== 17th century ====
In the 17th century English ballad Spanish Lady (one of several English and Irish songs with that name), a Spanish lady captured by an English captain falls in love with her captor and begs him not to set her free but to take her with him to England, and in this appeal describes herself as "A lady in distress".

==== 18th century ====
The damsel in distress makes her debut in the modern novel as the title character of Samuel Richardson's Clarissa (1748), where she is menaced by the wicked seducer Lovelace. The phrase "damsel in distress" is found in Richardson's The History of Sir Charles Grandison (1753):

And he is sometimes a mighty Prince ... and I am a damsel in distress

Reprising her medieval role, the damsel in distress is a staple character of Gothic literature, where she is typically incarcerated in a castle or monastery and menaced by a sadistic nobleman, or members of the religious orders. Early examples in this genre include Matilda in Horace Walpole's The Castle of Otranto, Emily in Ann Radcliffe's The Mysteries of Udolpho, and Antonia in Matthew Lewis's The Monk.

The perils faced by this Gothic heroine were taken to an extreme by the Marquis de Sade in Justine, who exposed the erotic subtext which lay beneath the damsel-in-distress scenario.

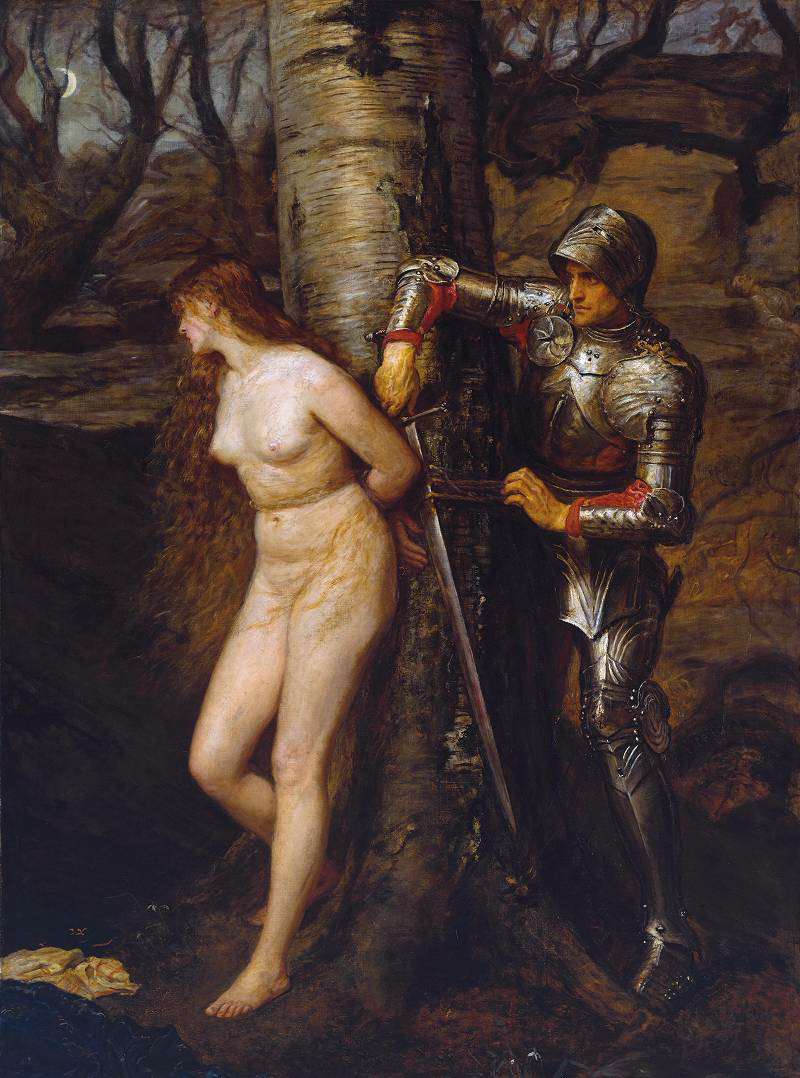
John Everett Millais's The Knight Errant of 1870 saves a damsel in distress and underlines the erotic subtext of the genre.

One exploration of the theme of the persecuted maiden is the fate of Gretchen in Goethe's Faust. According to the philosopher Schopenhauer:

"The great Goethe has given us a distinct and visible description of this denial of the will, brought about by great misfortune and by the despair of all deliverance, in his immortal masterpiece Faust, in the story of the sufferings of Gretchen. I know of no other description in poetry. It is a perfect specimen of the second path, which leads to the denial of the will not, like the first, through the mere knowledge of the suffering of the whole world which one acquires voluntarily, but through the excessive pain felt in one's own person. It is true that many tragedies bring their violently willing heroes ultimately to this point of complete resignation, and then the will-to-live and its phenomenon usually end at the same time. But no description known to me brings to us the essential point of that conversion so distinctly and so free from everything extraneous as the one mentioned in Faust" (The World as Will and Representation, Vol. I, §68)

==== 19th century ====
The misadventures of the damsel in distress of the Gothic novel continued in a somewhat caricatured form in Victorian melodrama. According to Michael Booth in his classic study English Melodrama, the Victorian stage melodrama featured a limited number of stock characters: the hero, the villain, the heroine, an old man, an old woman, a comic man and a comic woman engaged in a sensational plot featuring themes of love and murder. Often the good but not very clever hero is duped by a scheming villain, who has eyes on the damsel in distress until fate intervenes to ensure the triumph of good over evil.

Such melodrama influenced the fledgling film industry and led to damsels in distress being the subject of many early silent films, especially those that were made as multi-episode serials. Early examples include The Adventures of Kathlyn in 1913 and The Hazards of Helen, which ran from 1914 to 1917. The silent film heroines frequently faced new perils provided by the Industrial Revolution and catering to the new medium's need for visual spectacle. Here we find the heroine tied to a railway track, burning buildings, and explosions. Sawmills were another stereotypical danger of the Industrial age, as recorded in a popular song from a later era:

... A bad gunslinger called Salty Sam was chasin' poor Sweet Sue

He trapped her in the old sawmill and said with an evil laugh,
If you don't give me the deed to your ranch
I'll saw you all in half!
And then he grabbed her (and then)
He tied her up (and then)

He turned on the bandsaw (and then, and then...!) ...

— Along Came Jones by The Coasters

==== 20th century ====
Jungle girl Nyoka, played by Kay Aldridge, frequently found herself in distress in Perils of Nyoka.

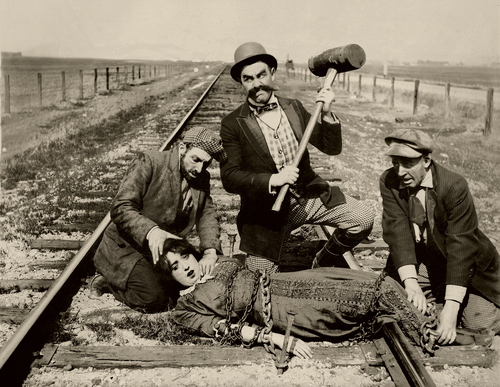
Barney Oldfield's A Race for a Life [1913] with left to right:Hank Mann; Ford Serling; At St John and in foreground Mabel Normand

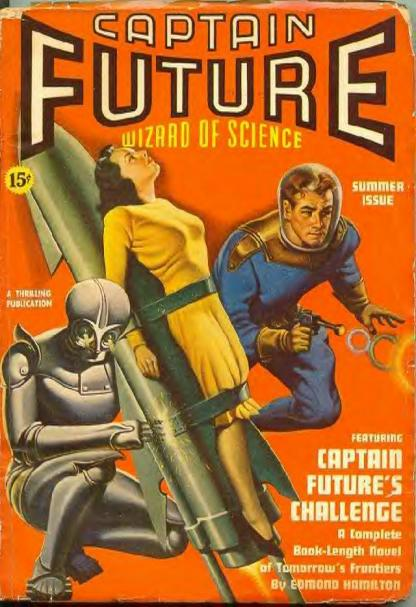
Pulp Science Fiction hero Captain Future in the act of saving a Damsel in distress (cover art by Earle K. Bergey)

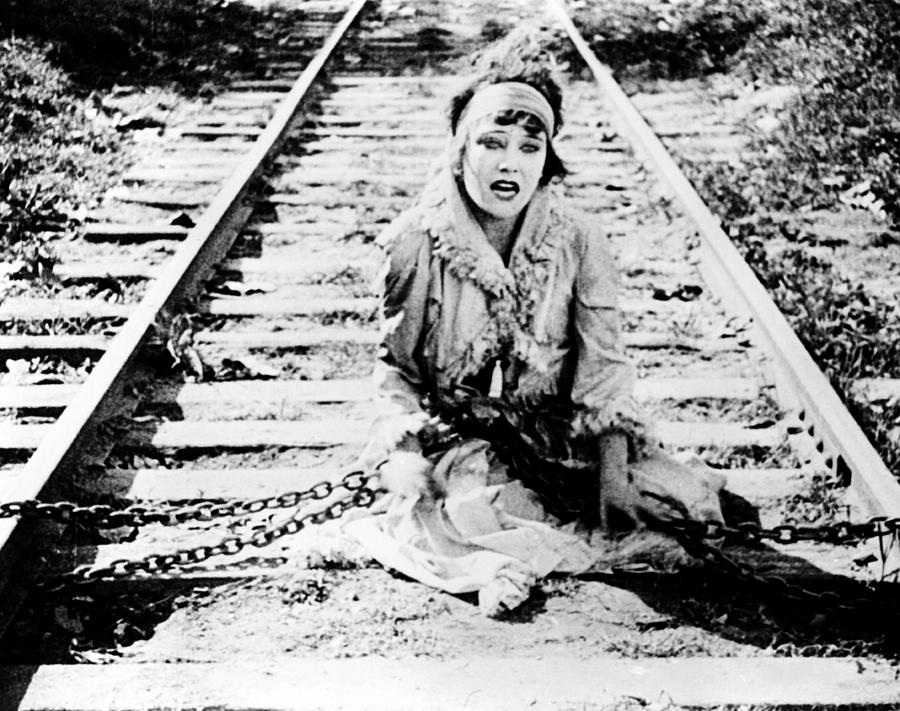
Gloria Swanson in Teddy at the Throttle (1917)

During the First World War, the imagery of a damsel in distress was extensively used in Allied propaganda (see illustrations). Particularly, the Imperial German conquest and occupation of Belgium was commonly referred to as the Rape of Belgium – effectively transforming Allied soldiers into knights bent on saving that rape victim. This was expressed explicitly in the lyrics of "Keep the Home Fires Burning" mentioning the "boys" as having gone to help a "Nation in Distress".

A form of entertainment in which the damsel-in-distress emerged as a stereotype at this time was stage magic. Restraining attractive female assistants and imperiling them with blades and spikes became a staple of 20th century magicians' acts. Noted illusion designer and historian Jim Steinmeyer identifies the beginning of this phenomenon as coinciding with the introduction of the "sawing a woman in half" illusion. In 1921 magician P. T. Selbit became the first to present such an act to the public. Steinmeyer observes that: "Before Selbit's illusion, it was not a cliche that pretty ladies were teased and tortured by magicians. Since the days of Robert-Houdin, both men and women were used as the subjects for magic illusions". However, changes in fashion and great social upheavals during the first decades of the 20th century made Selbit's choice of "victim" both practical and popular. The trauma of war had helped to desensitise the public to violence and the emancipation of women had changed attitudes to them. Audiences were tiring of older, more genteel forms of magic. It took something shocking, such as the horrific productions of the Grand Guignol theatre, to cause a sensation in this age. Steinmeyer concludes that: "beyond practical concerns, the image of the woman in peril became a specific fashion in entertainment".

The damsel-in-distress continued as a mainstay of the comics, film, and television industries throughout the 20th century. Imperiled heroines in need of rescue were a frequent occurrence in black-and-white film serials made by studios such as Columbia Pictures, Mascot Pictures, Republic Pictures, and Universal Studios in the 1930s, 1940s and early 1950s. These serials sometimes drew inspiration for their characters and plots from adventure novels and comic books. Notable examples include the character Nyoka the Jungle Girl, whom Edgar Rice Burroughs created for comic books and who was later adapted into a serial heroine in the Republic productions Jungle Girl (1941) and its sequel Perils of Nyoka (1942). Additional classic damsels in that mold were Jane Porter, in both the novel and movie versions of Tarzan, and Ann Darrow, as played by Fay Wray in the movie King Kong (1933), in one of the most iconic instances. The notorious hoax documentary Ingagi (1930) also featured this idea, and Wray's role was repeated by Jessica Lange and Naomi Watts in remakes. As journalist Andrew Erish has noted: "Gorillas plus sexy women in peril equals enormous profits". Small screen iconic portrayals, this time in children's cartoons, are Underdog's girlfriend, Sweet Polly Purebred and Nell Fenwick, who is often rescued by inept Mountie Dudley Do-Right. On the original Teenage Mutant Ninja Turtles TV series, the television newswoman April O'Neil was repeatedly held captive by the evil Shredder and often needed to be rescued by the titular turtles.

The James Bond novels of Ian Fleming, originally published in the 1950s and 1960s, would sometimes feature the "Bond girl" tied up by a villain and needing to be rescued by Bond, and this theme continued into a number of the films, produced from the early 1960s onward, including Dr. No, The Spy Who Loved Me, Octopussy and Spectre, all of which show Bond rescuing the female lead, who has been tied up. In some films, Bond and a female character are tied up together (for example, in Live and Let Die and Moonraker). In other films, Bond is shown tied up and in peril (examples include Goldfinger, You Only Live Twice, The World Is Not Enough, Casino Royale and Skyfall) and in some cases is rescued by the female lead (such as in Licence to Kill and Spectre).

The protagonists of the Disney Princess franchise are often depicted as damsels in distress, with the leads of Snow White and the Seven Dwarfs and Sleeping Beauty requiring rescue by Prince love interest from a witch's evil plan. Scholars have noted the emphasis on youth and femininity in these narratives: with the damsel princess being depicted as youthful and hyperfeminine, while their witch captors are older "evil femme fatales or ugly hags" embodying masculine traits.

Frequently cited examples of a damsel in distress in comics include Lois Lane, who was eternally getting into trouble and needing to be rescued by Superman, and Olive Oyl, who was in a near-constant state of kidnap, requiring her to be saved by Popeye.

Coined by Gail Simone in 1999, "women in refrigerators" is a literary trope where female characters are injured, sexually assaulted, killed, or depowered (an event colloquially known as fridging), sometimes to stimulate "protective" traits, and often as a plot device intended to move a male character's story arc forward. The phrase is used to analyze why such plot devices are used disproportionately on female characters. It refers to an incident in Green Lantern vol. 3 #54 (1994), written by Ron Marz, in which Kyle Rayner, the title hero, comes home to his apartment to find that the villain Major Force had killed his girlfriend, Alexandra DeWitt, and stuffed her in a refrigerator. Simone and a number of collaborators created the website Women in Refrigerators which hosts a list of works which they believe express the trope.

== Critical and theoretical responses ==
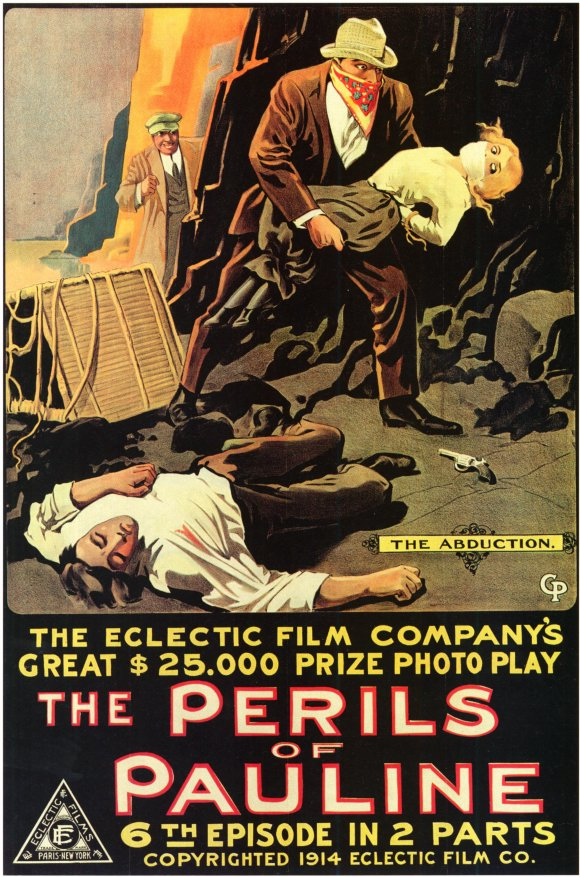
A poster for The Perils of Pauline (1914)

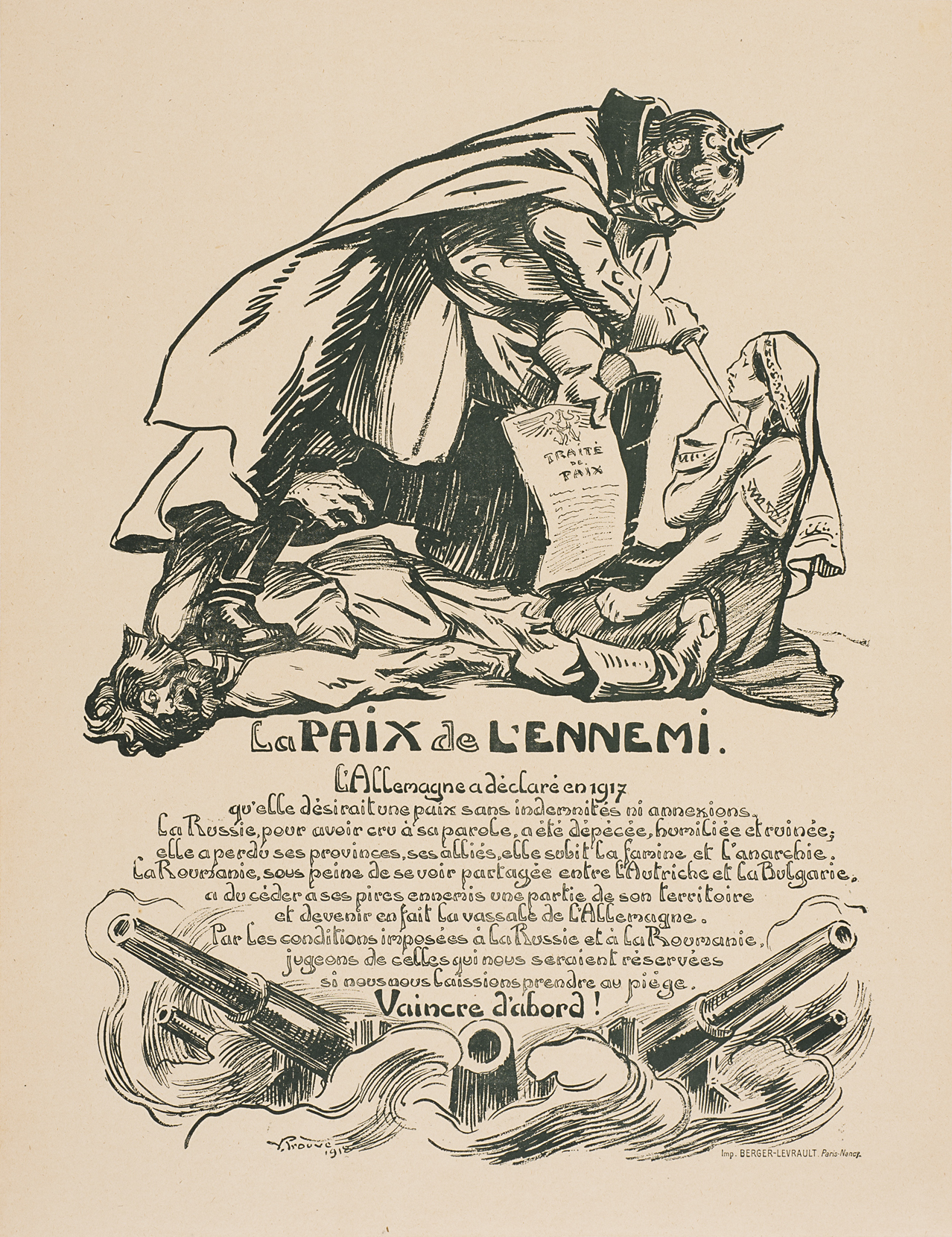
Romania as a helpless "damsel in distress" threatened by the brutal Imperial Germany, in a French World War I caricature

A U.S. World War I poster (Harry R. Hopps; 1917) invites prospective recruits to symbolically save a "damsel in distress" from the monstrous Germans.

Damsels in distress have been cited as an example of differential treatment of genders in literature, film, and works of art. Feminist criticism of art, film, and literature has often examined gender-oriented characterisation and plot, including the common "damsel in distress" trope, as perpetrating regressive and patronizing myths about women. Many modern writers and directors, such as Anita Sarkeesian, Angela Carter and Jane Yolen, have revisited classic fairy tales and "damsel in distress" stories or collected and anthologised stories and folk tales that break the "damsel in distress" pattern.

== Empowered damsel ==
Films featuring an empowered damsel date to the early days of filmmaking. One of the films most often associated with the stereotypical damsel in distress, The Perils of Pauline (1914), also provides at least a partial counterexample, in that Pauline, played by Pearl White, is a strong character who decides against early marriage in favor of seeking adventure and becoming an author. Despite common belief, the film does not feature scenes with Pauline tied to a railroad track and threatened by a buzzsaw, although such scenes were incorporated into later re-creations and were also featured in other films made in the period around 1914. Academic Ben Singer has contested the idea that these "serial-queen melodramas" were male fantasies and has observed that they were marketed heavily at women. The first motion picture serial made in the United States, What Happened to Mary? (1912), was released to coincide with a serial story of the same name published in McClure's Ladies' World magazine.

Empowered damsels were a feature of the serials made in the 1930s and 1940s by studios such as Republic Pictures. The "cliffhanger" scenes at the end of episodes provide many examples of female heroines bound and helpless and facing fiendish death traps. But those heroines, played by actresses such as Linda Stirling and Kay Aldridge, were often strong, assertive women who ultimately played an active part in vanquishing the villains.

C. L. Moore's short story "Shambleau" (1933) – generally acknowledged as epoch-making in the history of science fiction – begins in what seems a classical damsel in distress situation: the protagonist, space adventurer Northwest Smith, sees a "sweetly-made girl" pursued by a lynch mob intent on killing her and intervenes to save her, but finds her not a girl nor a human being at all, but a disguised alien creature, predatory and highly dangerous. Soon, Smith himself needs rescuing and barely escapes with his life.

These themes have received successive updates in modern-era characters, ranging from "spy girls" of the 1960s to current film and television heroines. In her book The Devil with James Bond (1967) Ann Boyd compared James Bond with an updating of the legend of Saint George and the "princess and dragon" genre, particularly with Dr. No's dragon tank. The damsel in distress theme is also very prominent in The Spy Who Loved Me, where the story is told in the first person by the young woman Vivienne Michel, who is threatened with imminent rape by thugs when Bond kills them and claims her as his reward.

The female spy Emma Peel in the 1960s television series The Avengers was often seen in "damsel in distress" situations. The character and her reactions, portrayed by actress Diana Rigg, differentiated these scenes from other film and television scenarios where women were similarly imperiled as pure victims or pawns in the plot. A scene with Emma Peel bound and threatened with a death ray in the episode From Venus with Love is a direct parallel to James Bond's confrontation with a laser in the film Goldfinger. Both are examples of the classic hero's ordeal as described by Campbell and Vogler. The serial heroines and Emma Peel are cited as providing inspiration for the creators of strong heroines in more recent times, ranging from Joan Wilder in Romancing the Stone and Princess Leia in Star Wars to "post feminist" icons such as Buffy Summers from Buffy the Vampire Slayer, Xena and Gabrielle from Xena: Warrior Princess, Sydney Bristow from Alias, Natasha Romanoff from the Marvel Cinematic Universe, Kim Possible from the series of the same name, Sarah Connor from the Terminator franchise, and Veronica Mars, also from the series of the same name.

Reflecting these changes, Daphne Blake of the Scooby-Doo cartoon series (who throughout the series is captured dozens of times, falls through trap doors, etc.) is portrayed in the Scooby-Doo film as a wisecracking feminist heroine (quote: "I've had it with this damsel in distress thing!"). The film Sherlock Holmes (2009) includes a classical damsel in distress episode, where Irene Adler (played by Rachel McAdams) is helplessly bound to a conveyor belt in an industrial slaughterhouse, and is saved from being sawn in half by a chainsaw; yet in other episodes of the same film Adler is strong and assertive – for example, overcoming with contemptuous ease two thugs who sought to rob her (and robbing them instead). In the film's climax, it is Adler who saves the day, dismantling at the last moment a device set to poison the entire membership of Parliament.

In the final scene of the Walt Disney Pictures film Enchanted (2007) the traditional roles are reversed when male protagonist Robert Philip (Patrick Dempsey) is captured by Queen Narissa (Susan Sarandon) in her dragon form. In a King Kong–like fashion, she carries him to the top of a New York skyscraper, until Robert's beloved Giselle climbs it, sword in hand, to save him.

A similar role reversal is evident in Stieg Larsson's The Girl with the Dragon Tattoo, in whose climactic scene the male protagonist is captured by a serial killer, locked in an underground torture room, chained, stripped naked, and humiliated when his female partner enters to save him and destroy the villain. Still another example is Foxglove Summer, part of Ben Aaronovitch's Rivers of London series - where the protagonist Peter Grant is bound and taken captive by the Queen of the Faeries, and it is Grant's girlfriend who comes to rescue him, riding a Steel Horse.

Another role reversal is in Titanic (1997), written and directed by James Cameron. After Jack Dawson is handcuffed to a pipe in the master-at-arms's office to drown, Rose DeWitt Bukater leaves her family to rescue him and they head back to the upper deck.

In Robert J. Harris's WWII spy thriller The Thirty-One Kings (2017), the chivalrous protagonist Richard Hannay takes time off from his vital intelligence mission to help a beautiful young woman, harassed on a Paris street by two drunken men. She laughingly thanks him though saying she could have dealt with the men by herself. Hannay has no suspicion that she is herself the dangerous Nazi agent he had been sent to apprehend, and that she recognized him and knows his mission. Unsuspectingly he drinks the glass of brandy she offers him - whereupon he loses consciousness and wakes up securely bound. Gloating and jeering, the girl mocks Hannay for his sense of chivalry proving to be his undoing. Destined to an ignominious watery death, it is the would be rescuer who is in very big distress; fortunately, his friends show up in the nick of time to save him from the clutches of the femme fatale.

== In video games ==
In computer and video games, female characters are often cast in the role of the damsel in distress, with their rescue being the objective of the game. An early example of the damsel archetype in video games is Pauline, a Nintendo character in the 1981 arcade game Donkey Kong. The gameplay involves Mario rescuing her from the top of a construction site after she is kidnapped and held captive by a giant ape.

In the Dragon's Lair game series, Princess Daphne, the beautiful daughter of King Aethelred, serves as the series' damsel in distress. The first Dragon's Lair game, released in 1983, involves the hero Dirk the Daring facing a series of challenges to rescue Daphne from a dragon named Singe. Jon M. Gibson of GameSpy called her "the epitome" of the trope.

Princess Peach throughout much of the Mario franchise is also a paradigmatic example. She is repeatedly kidnapped across the Super Mario series, beginning with her debut in Super Mario Bros. in 1985. In most games in the series she is kidnapped and trapped in a castle by the villain Bowser and his minions in order for Mario to rescue her. Peach has been described as the "quintessential damsel in distress" and her repeated abductions as a running joke and pop culture reference by Time.

Princess Zelda in the early The Legend of Zelda series has been described by Gladys L. Knight in her book Female Action Heroes as "perhaps one [of] the most well-known 'damsel in distress' princesses in video game history". In most games in the series she is given the role of a "princess in peril", requiring the hero, Link, to rescue her, although later games, such as Breath of the Wild, presented her as a more realized character.

In 1989, another Nintendo character, Princess Daisy, was cast in the role of damsel in distress in Super Mario Land. In Prince of Persia, an imprisoned princess is the game's objective, necessitating the player character to rescue her.

== See also ==
- Courtly love
- Feminist film theory
- Feminist literary criticism
- Feminist science fiction
- Final girl
- Knight-errant
- Literary trope
- Male gaze
- Missing white woman syndrome
- Portrayal of women in comics
- Portrayal of women in video games
- Predicament escape
- Princess and dragon
- Scream queen
- Stock character
- Strong female character
- Women in refrigerators

== Bibliography ==
- Chisholm, Hugh, ed. (1911). "Andromeda" . Encyclopædia Britannica (11th ed.). Cambridge University Press.
- Mario Praz (1930) The Romantic Agony Chapter 3: 'The Shadow of the Divine Marquis'
- Robert K. Klepper, Silent Films, 1877-1996, A Critical Guide to 646 Movies, pub. McFarland & Company, ISBN 0-7864-2164-9
