= Hesione =

Name of several Greek mythological figures

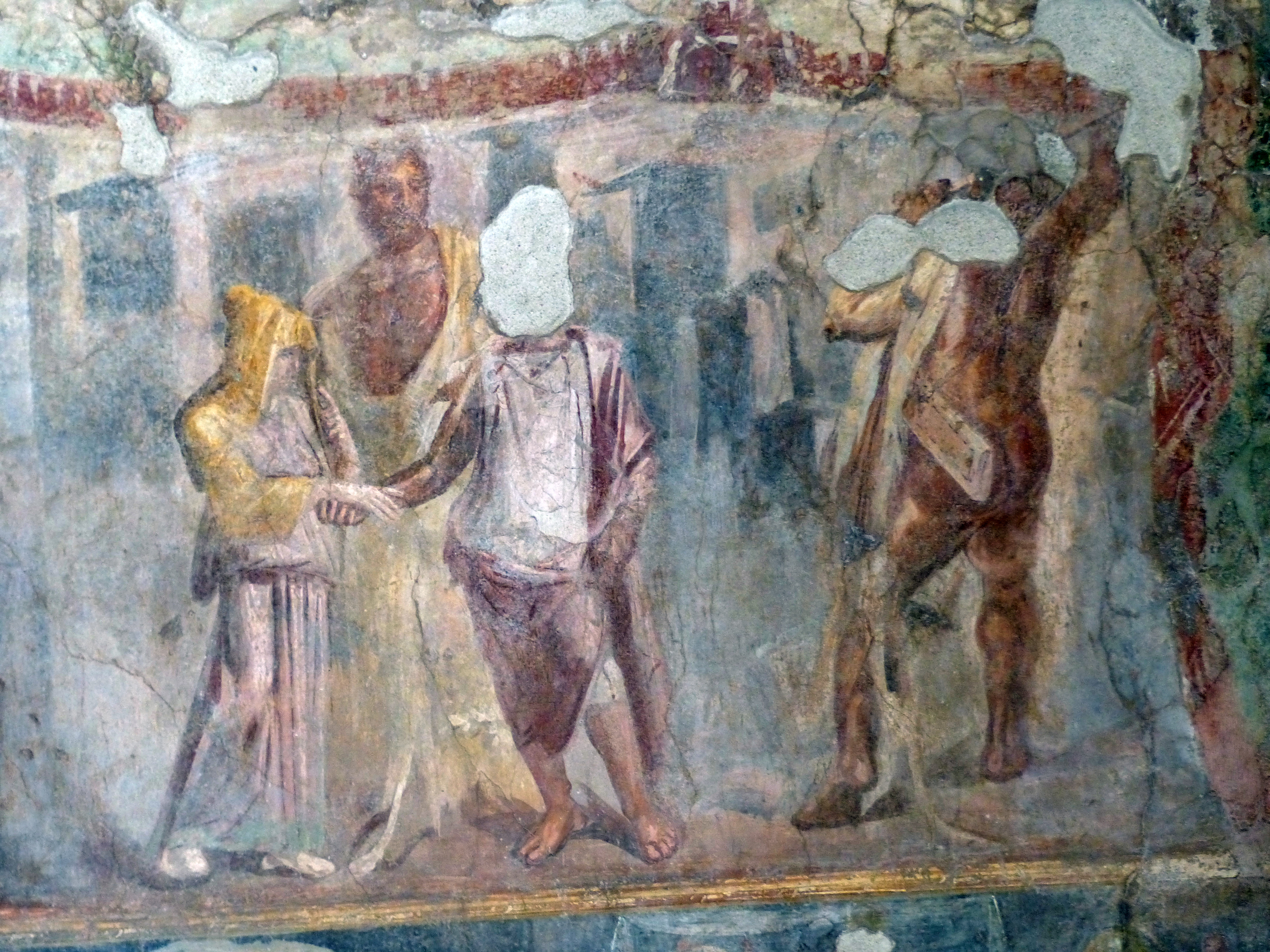
The marriage of Telamon and Hesione or Hesione's farewell to her brother Priam under the attention of Heracles and Telamon on the right, detail of fresco from the triclinium of the House of Octavius Quartio at Pompeii

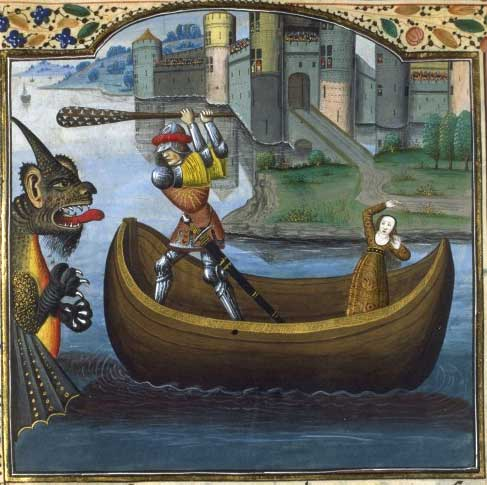
Heracles saves Hesione from the sea monster; 15th-century miniature

In Greek mythology, Hesione (Note: /hɪˈsaɪəni/, hiss-EYE-ən-ee; Ancient Greek: Ἡσιόνη) was a Trojan princess and daughter of Laomedon taken captive by Telamon. By him, she was mother of the hero Teucer. In later accounts, her abduction eventually led to the Trojan War.

== Mythology ==
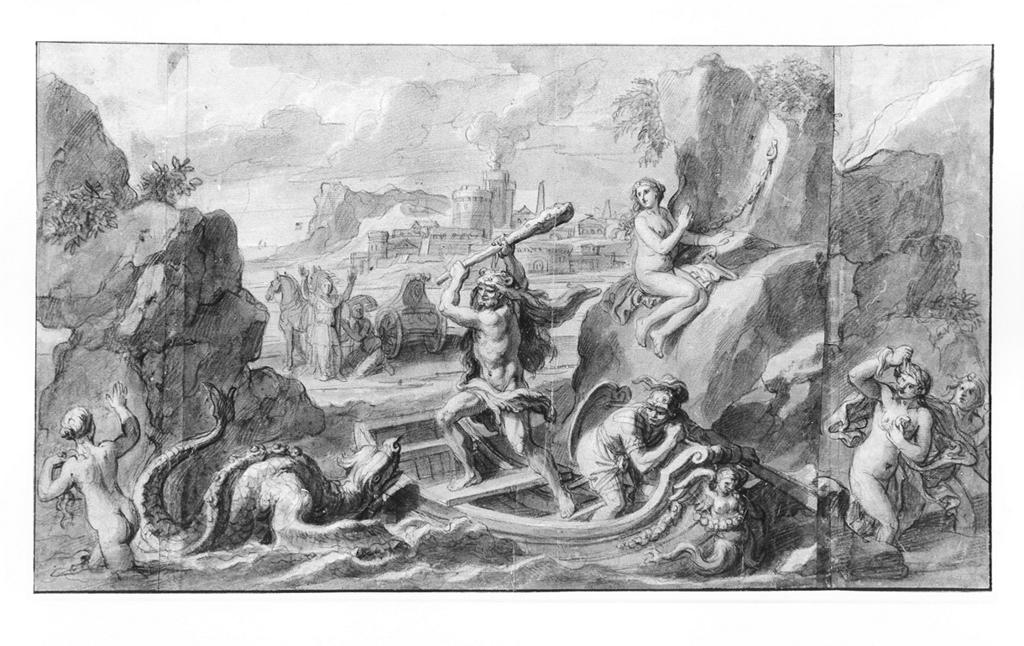
François-Alexandre Verdier

According to the Bibliotheca, the most prominent Hesione was a Trojan princess, daughter of King Laomedon of Troy, sister of Priam and second wife of King Telamon of Salamis. The first notable myth Hesione is cited in is that of Heracles, who saves her from a sea monster. However, her role becomes significant many years later when she is described as a potential trigger of the Trojan War.

Apollo and Poseidon were angry with King Laomedon because he refused to pay the wage he promised them for building Troy's walls. Apollo sent a plague and Poseidon a sea monster to destroy Troy. Oracles promised deliverance if Laomedon would expose his daughter Hesione to be devoured by the sea monster Cetus (in other versions, the lot happened to fall on her) and he exposed her by fastening her naked to the rocks near the sea. Heracles, Telamon, and Oicles happened to arrive on their return from the expedition against the Amazons. Seeing her exposed, Heracles promised to save her on condition that Laomedon would give him the wonderful horses he had received from Zeus as compensation for Zeus' kidnapping of Ganymede. Laomedon agreed, and Heracles slew the monster. In some accounts, after being swallowed by it, he hacked at its innards for three days before it died. He emerged, having lost all his hair. However, Laomedon refused to give him the promised award.

In a later expedition, Heracles attacked Troy, slew Laomedon and all of Laomedon's sons except the youngest, Podarces. Heracles gave Laomedon's daughter Hesione as a prize to Telamon instead of keeping her for himself. He allowed her to take with her any captives that she wished; she chose her brother Podarces. Heracles allowed her to ransom him in exchange for her veil. Therefore, Podarces henceforth became known as Priam, from ancient Greek πρίασθαι priasthai, meaning "to buy". Heracles then bestowed the government of Troy on Priam. However, it is also claimed that Priam simply happened to be absent campaigning in Phrygia during Heracles' attack on Troy.

Hesione was taken home by Telamon, married him, and bore him a son, Teucros, half-brother to Telamon's son from his first marriage, Ajax. Alternatively, she became pregnant with Trambelus while still on board the ship and then escaped to Miletus. Arion, the king of Miletus, found her hidden in a forest and rescued her. He raised Trambelus as if the boy was his own son. It is also possible, though, that the mother of Trambelus was not Hesione, but a certain Theaneira.

According to Vergil, Priam came to Salamis to visit his lost sister.

Many years later, Priam sent Antenor to Greece to demand Hesione's return. The Trojan envoys were rejected and driven away. Priam then sent his son Paris to retrieve her. According to Dares Phrygius, Paris stopped on Cythera to sacrifice to the gods. There, he fell in love with the Spartan queen Helen, bringing her back to Troy instead of his aunt.

Dracontius, however, wrote that Paris arrived in Salamis to request Hesione's return. Hesione embraced Paris, praising his likeness to Priam. Even so, the Trojans were again harshly rejected by Telamon. It was on the way home from Salamis that Paris landed on Cyprus and met Helen. The pair fell in love and eloped, inciting the Trojan War.

In the account of Dares, Priam was ultimately willing to accept the abduction of Helen, due to the Greeks' refusal to return Hesione.

=== Spurious references ===
The name Hesione in Dictys Cretensis 4.22 appears to be an error for Plesione of Dictys 1.9 and that in turn an error for Pleione.

== See also ==
Similar tales of a hero saving a love interest from a monster:

- Perseus and Andromeda
- Eurybarus and Alcyoneus
- Menestratus and Cleostratus

== Bibliography ==
- Apollodorus; Hyginus (2007). Apollodorus' Library and Hyginus' Fabulae: Two Handbooks of Greek Mythology. R. Scott Smith (translator). Hackett. ISBN 978-0872208209.
- Schwab, G. (2001). Gods and Heroes of Ancient Greece. New York: Pantheon Books.
