= Meganeira =

Several Greek mythological women

Meganeira or Meganira (Ancient Greek: Μεγάνειρα, romanized: Megáneira, lit. 'great lady', 'woman of high status' or 'woman of great men') is a name that may refer to one of the following figures in Greek mythology:

- Meganeira, daughter of Crocon and Saesara, and mother of Apheidas and Elatus by Arcas, son of Zeus and Callisto.
- Meganeira, mother by Diomus of Alcyoneus. Together with her family, they lived in the city of Crisa at the foot of the Parnassus. This Alcyoneus was destined by lot to be sacrificed to the monster Sybaris on the basis of an oracle. However, the boy was saved by Eurybarus, who fell in love with the handsome lad and killed the monster.
- Meganeira, same as Metanira, wife of King Celeus of Eleusis.
