= Euphemus (mythology) =

Name of several distinct characters in Greek mythology

In Greek mythology, Euphemus (/juːˈfiːməs/; Ancient Greek: Εὔφημος, romanized: Eúphēmos, lit. 'reputable', 'well-spoken' or 'of good report', pronounced [eʊ̯́pʰɛːmos]) was the name of several distinct characters:

- Euphemus, son of Poseidon and an Argonaut.
- Euphemus, a descendant of the river god Axius and the father of the hero Eurybarus who defeated the female monster Sybaris.
- Euphemus, son of Troezenus and a leader of the Thracian Cicones. He was an ally of the Trojans. According to late writers, he was killed either by Achilles or by one of the following four: Diomedes, Idomeneus and the two Ajaxes who at one point united to attack the opponents. He was buried in Troy next to a statue of Ares.
- Euphemus, surname of Zeus on Lesbos.
