= Alcyoneus (son of Diomos) =

Sacrificial victim in Greek mythology

In Greek mythology, Alcyoneus (/ælˈsaɪəˌnuːs/; Ancient Greek: Ἀλκυονεύς, romanized: Alkuoneús, lit. 'kingfisher') is a young and handsome man from Crissa (an ancient Greek city near Delphi), the only son of Diomus and Meganeira. He features in a short myth where he is chosen to be the sacrificial victim for a beast called Sybaris that terrorised Delphi and the surrounding area, a prototypical example of the hero slays a monster and saves a princess tale. His tale survives in the writings of second-century author Antoninus Liberalis, and might originate from an older work by Nicander of Colophon.

== Etymology ==
The masculine first name Alkyoneus, along with the feminine spelling Alkyone, is derived from the ancient Greek noun alkuṓn (ἀλκυών), which refers to a sea-bird distinct for its mournful song, usually the common kingfisher bird in particular. The exact meaning of that word is uncertain and cannot be determined, as Robert S. P. Beekes theorised it to be of pre-Greek origin, instead of Indo-European.

Nevertheless, Greek folk etymology falsely connected it to the words ἅλς (háls, meaning "brine, salt") and κυέω (kuéō, meaning "to conceive"); because of that, the word for the bird was often misspelled with a rough breathing (halkuṓn) instead of a smooth one (alkuṓn). The English name of the genus of the kingfisher bird, Halcyon, and the related phrase "halcyon days", are also derived from this root.

== Mythology ==
In Delphi, a terrifying monster called Sybaris terrorized the region from the Mount Cirphis, preying particularly on the young, either animals or humans, on a daily basis. The inhabitants sought out the help of the god Apollo, and he informed them that they would be salvaged if they sacrificed a youth to the monster's cave. A beautiful and good-natured youth named Alcyoneus, the only child of Diomus and Meganeira, was chosen by lot.

He was crowned with garlands by the priests of Crissa and led with a procession to Sybaris's cave. On their way there they happened upon the young and brave Eurybarus, who was coming down from neighbouring Curetis in Aetolia. Eurybarus fell in love with Alcyoneus at first sight, and immediately inquired to learn where he was being taken to and why. Upon learning of the prophecy and the necessary sacrifice, Eurybarus willingly offered to take Alcyoneus' place, not wanting him to perish. He took the garlands from Alcyoneus and wore them himself, and then ordered the entourage to lead him to Sybaris instead.

Thus Eurybarus entered the cavern of the monster instead of Alcyoneus. He dragged Sybaris out of her den, and tossed her off the crags of the mountain. Sybaris cracked her head on the rocks on the footings of Crissa, and was never heard of again. Thus Alcyoneus' life was saved, and the people of Crissa were safe from her.

== Culture ==
The myth is the typical heroic tale where the fearsome monster that demands a human sacrifice is slain, the most famous of which in Greek mythology is that of Perseus and Andromeda whom he saved from a sea-monster sent by the sea-god Poseidon. Another similar myth is Heracles being willingly swallowed by a sea-monster and then killing it from the inside in order to save its would-be victim, the princess Hesione.

The tale of Alcyoneus and Eurybarus is identical to a legend said about Euthymus, an early fifth-century BC Olympic victor from Locri, in which he saved a Temesian woman from being sacrificed to a ghostly monster and then married her. A notable subversion is that in this case, the ogre is female and its beautiful victim male, and similarly the couple is a homosexual one, both rare variants of the dragon-slayer fairytale type (ATU 300 in the Aarne-Thompson-Uther Index). Pausanias, a second-century geographer, describes a copy of an older painting depicting a landscape in Temesa in which a youth is about to be sacrificed to a dusky monster called Lycas (meaning "wolfish"); the caption next to the youth reads Sybaris.

Another myth with similarities is that of Menestratus and Cleostratus, two lovers from Thespiae. The teenage Cleostratus was chosen by lot to be sacrificed to a dragon that ravaged Thespiae, but Menestratus took his place, clad in a fish hook-coated breastplate; the dragon perished when it devoured him, thus salvaging Cleostratus and Thespiae. A major difference is that Cleostratus and Menestratus are an established couple before disaster strucks, whereas Alcyoneus and Eurybarus only meet when Alcyoneus is being led to Sybaris, and there is no confirmation of an eventual relationship between the two.

== See also ==
- Damsel in distress
- Princess and dragon
- Saint George and the Dragon
- Sleeping Beauty (1959 film)
- Homoerotic themes in Greek and Roman mythology
