= Cleostratus (mythology) =

Youth from Thespiae in Greek mythology

In Greek mythology, Cleostratus (Ancient Greek: Κλεόστρατος, romanized: Kleóstratos, lit. 'renowned army') is a teenage boy from Thespiae, a town in Boeotia, who is chosen to be offered to a dragon in a yearly sacrifice to the monster, until he is saved by his lover Menestratus. His and Menestratus's myth is known thanks to the Description of Greece, a second-century work by Greek traveller and geographer Pausanias. Cleostratus' myth is an early example of the popular hero-tale where the hero saves a damsel or princess from a vicious dragon.

== Etymology ==
The ancient Greek proper name Κλεόστρατος is a compound word composed of the words κλέος (kléos, Doric form κλέϝος, kléwos) and στρατός (stratós) which translate to "glory" or "fame" and "army, military force" respectively. Both words have Proto-Indo-European origins; κλέος is derived from the verb κλύω, which means 'to hear, to understand', itself from the root *ḱlew-, 'to hear', while στρατός is from the root *str̥tós, earlier *ster- ("to spread, to extend").

== Mythology ==
Cleostratus lived in Thespiae, a town in Boeotia; no family or lineage of his is recorded. He was the young eromenos of a man named Menestratus. Their homeland was attacked by a dragon, which ravaged Thespiae and caused great destruction. The horrified people of Thespiae asked their god for guidance on how to get rid of it, (Note: The identity of the god who ordered the annual sacrifices is disputed; it seems that it was the king of the gods Zeus, who is introduced in the preceding sentence in the original Greek text, but it could also be Apollo, the oracular god who handed out prophecies.) and he told them they needed to sacrifice each year a youth (ephebos) to the dragon. (Note: Cleostratus would have been around the ages of 18-20.) The Thespians did as told, and after an unspecified number of years and sacrifices, Cleostratus was chosen by lot to be the next sacrificial victim.

Menestratus, however, who would not allow Cleostratus to suffer death at the jaws of the dragon, came up with a plan to save him. Although he was probably not a teenager at the time and thus ineligible, he volunteered to take Cleostratus' place, nevertheless, and entered the dragon's den of his own volition, clad in a bronze breastplate that had an upward-pointing fish-hook fastened on its plate, hoping the sharp points would kill the dragon once it swallowed it. His plan was successful and the dragon perished, but so did Menestratus himself in the process, whose sacrifice saved both Cleostratus and the other Thespians.

Following the deaths of the dragon and Menestratus, the people of Thespiae would erect a bronze statue to honour Zeus, thereafter worshipped in the town under the epithet 'Saviour', although it had not been Zeus who actually saved the city; it is not always possible to find coherent explanations for all aspects of Greek myths and legends.

== Origin and interpretation ==
The second-century Greek traveller Pausanias is the sole surviving source for this tale, however the myth can be assumed to be of at least Hellenistic origin (the period between 323 BC and 30 BC).

=== Parallels within Greek mythology ===
The Thespian myth is an example of the common heroic trope where a young person is supposed to be sacrificed to a monster, and then saved; the most famous of these in Greek mythology is the story of Perseus saving Andromeda from Poseidon's sea-monster. Another example is how Heracles allowed himself to be swallowed by the sea-beast Cetus and then hacked it from the inside in order to save the Trojan princess Hesione. Other stories of monster-slaying were prevalent all over ancient Greece.

Cleostratus' story is particularly similar to that of Alcyoneus and Eurybarus of Crissa, with Cleostratus' role paralleling that of Alcyoneus'. In both stories there is a theme of a horrifying, and apparently serpentine, beast that savagely ravages a town; the Thespian dragon causes undefined damage, while Sybaris specifically targets livestock and humans. A man then decides to confront it once and for all, willingly taking the place of a young man or boy they have fallen in love with, who is supposed to be sacrificed to the beast after being chosen by the community. Differences include that Cleostratus and Menestratus are an established couple, whereas Eurybarus only met Alcyoneus on the day the youth was about to die. Also, unlike Eurybarus, Menestratus does not survive the encounter with the beast. The stories of Cleostratus and Alcyoneus bear the most pressing parallels to the myths of Andromeda and Hesione, only with land-based monsters supplanting marine ones.

=== Legends ===
Another tale of the same type is a legend said about Euthymus of Locri, an Olympic victor of the fifth century BC from Epizephyrian Locris, who killed a beast and saved a beautiful woman from it, then married her. Unlike that legend, and more in line with the Alcyoneus-Eurybarus story, the lovers of Thespiae are of the same sex, a rather rare variant of the fairytale trope where the hero saves the damsel in distress from a dragon.

The use of a hooked or bladed armour to slay the monster is also a common motif in dragon-slaying tales around the globe; in the Persian epic poem Shahnameh (written circa 1000 AD) a chariot covered by a box from which swords protrude is used to kill the dragon, while in the British legend of the Blacksmith of Kirkudbright the eponymous hero kills the White Snake by wearing a suit of armour with retractable spikes and allowing the beast to swallow him.

A similar close parallel is found in a little-known and deeply rooted in folklore legend about the iconoclast Eastern Roman emperor Constantine V (r. 741–775), in which he faced a lion and a dragon with the use of a lorica falcata (a breastplate armored with spikes). The ending of the story is not preserved, but it is clear that Constantine succeeded and lived, unlike Menestratus, while human sacrifice and the fair maiden in need of rescue are not present. Although the similarities between them do no warrant a relation of direct connection, it is nevertheless possible that a small part of ancient lore survived into the legend of Constantine.

== See also ==
- Saint George and the dragon
- Damsel in distress
- Princess and dragon

== Bibliography ==
- Antoninus Liberalis, The Metamorphoses of Antoninus Liberalis translated by Francis Celoria (Routledge 1992). Online version at the Topos Text Project.
- Baring-Gould, Sabine (1897). Curious Myths of the Middle Ages. Longmans, Green, and Co.
- Beekes, Robert S. P. (2009). Lucien van Beek (ed.). Etymological Dictionary of Greek. Leiden Indo-European Etymological Dictionary Series. Vol. 1. Leiden, the Netherlands: Brill Publications. ISBN 978-90-04-17420-7.
- Beekes, Robert S. P. (2010). Lucien van Beek (ed.). Etymological Dictionary of Greek. Leiden Indo-European Etymological Dictionary Series. Vol. 2. Leiden, the Netherlands: Brill Publications. ISBN 978-90-04-17418-4.
- Celoria, Francis (1992). The Metamorphoses of Antoninus Liberalis: A Translation with a Commentary. Canada, USA: Routledge. ISBN 0-415-06896-7.
- Felton, Debbie (2021). Monsters and Monarchs: Serial Killers in Classical Myth and History. Austin, US: University of Texas. ISBN 978-1-4773-0379-5.
- Fontenrose, Joseph Eddy (1980) [1st Pub. 1959]. Python: A Study of Delphic Myth and Its Origins. Los Angeles: University of California Press. ISBN 0-520-04091-0.
- Gero, Stephen (June 6, 1978). "The Legend of Constantine V as Dragon-Slayer". Greek, Roman and Byzantine Studies. 19 (2). Brown University.
- Grimal, Pierre (1987). The Dictionary of Classical Mythology. Wiley-Blackwell. ISBN 0-631-13209-0.
- Hansen, William F. (2002). Ariadne's Thread: A Guide to International Oral Narratives in Classical Literature. Cornell University Press. ISBN 0-8014-3670-2.
- Liddell, Henry George; Scott, Robert (1940). A Greek-English Lexicon, revised and augmented throughout by Sir Henry Stuart Jones with the assistance of Roderick McKenzie. Oxford: Clarendon Press. Online version at Perseus.tufts project.
- March, Jennifer R. (May 31, 2014). Dictionary of Classical Mythology. Oxbow Books. ISBN 978-1-78297-635-6.
- Ogden, Daniel (February 19, 2008). Perseus. Oxford, New York: Routledge. ISBN 0-203-93213-7.
- Ogden, Daniel (September 9, 2021). The Dragon in the West: From Ancient Myth to Modern Legend. Oxford: Oxford University Press. ISBN 978-0-19-883018-4.
- Pausanias, Description of Greece with an English Translation by W.H.S. Jones, Litt.D., and H.A. Ormerod, M.A., in 4 Volumes. Cambridge, MA, Harvard University Press; London, William Heinemann Ltd. 1918. Online version at the Perseus Digital Library.
- Tripp, Edward (June 1970). Crowell's Handbook of Classical Mythology (1st ed.). Thomas Y. Crowell Co. ISBN 069022608X.
