= Diomus (mythology) =

Men in Greek mythology

In Greek mythology, Diomus (Ancient Greek: Δίομος, romanized: Díomos) can refer to multiple people, including:

- Diomus, the Crissan husband of Meganeira and father by her of Alcyoneus, the young boy chosen to be sacrificied to Sybaris, the dreadful monster ravanging the city. Alcyoneus was saved by Eurybarus, who fell in love with him.
- Diomus, the son of Collytus and a favorite of the hero Heracles from whom the Attic deme of Diomea (Ancient Greek: Διόμεια, just outside the Themistoclean Wall of Athens) was said to have derived its name. Heracles fell in love with him while being generously hosted by Colyttus. After the death of the hero, Diomus offered sacrifices to Heracles but a swift or white dog disturbed the process by snatching the meat. Diomus then founded the Cynosarges sanctuary. In another version his name was Didymus, and was told by an oracle to establish the sanctuary after the dog incident. Yet another variation states that the dog was being sacrificed to Heracles, but an eagle snatched the meat away.
- Diomus, another name for Sopater, the farmer who sacrificied an ox at an Athenian festival during the time that animal sacrifice was not yet permitted.

== Bibliography ==
- Antoninus Liberalis, The Metamorphoses of Antoninus Liberalis translated into English by Francis Celoria (Routledge 1992). Online version at the Topos Text Project.
- Porphyry of Tyre, On Abstinence from Animal Food, translated into English by Thomas Taylor (1758-1835), first published 1823. Available online on Topos Text.
- Stephanus of Byzantium, Ethnica, Stephani Byzantii Ethnicorum quae supersunt, edited by August Meineike (1790-1870), published 1849. A few entries have been translated by Brady Kiesling. Available online at Topos Text.
- Sudas, The Suda, translated and edited by several authors, including David Whitehead and Antonella Ippolito. Suda on Line.
