= Sybaris (mythology) =

Monster in Greek mythology

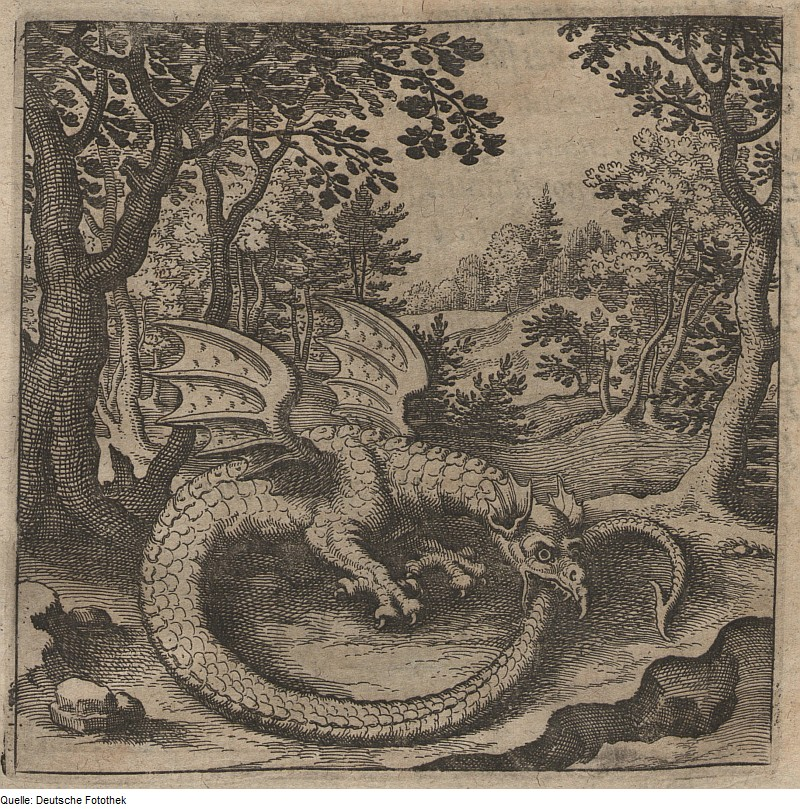
Sybaris

Sybaris (Ancient Greek: Σύβαρις) or Lamia (Ancient Greek: Λαμία) of Mount Cirphis, Greece, was a legendary cave-dwelling giant beast that devoured both livestock and humans. It was hurled from an overhanging rock and killed by the hero Eurybatus. Though no precise physical description is given in the primary source, it has been hypothesized by modern commentators that she must have been a dragon or an anguiped.

== Mythology ==
According to Greek myth, as recorded by Antoninus Liberalis, there was a vast cave at Mount Cirphis, close to Krisa. In this cave lived a giant, monstrous creature (Greek: θηρίον μέγα και υπερφυές). Some called it Lamia, while others referred to it as Sybaris. The creature was said to emerge daily from its cave, preying upon livestock and people. Krisa, situated a little southwest of Delphi (although the Homeric Hymn to Pythian Apollo suggests that Krisa was the ancient name for Delphi).

The people of the region asked the Oracle of Delphi how to end the depredations. The god Apollo answered that a young man should be offered to the beast to achieve peace from it. The young and handsome Alcyoneus, son of Diomos and Meganeira, was selected to be the victim, but the young hero Eurybatus (Eurybarus), son of Euphemos and a descendant of the river god Axios, and who by divine inspiration was passing through the region, was overcome with love for Alcyoneus and became determined to save him. He took his place as the victim and hurled the dragon from the mountainside, striking it against the rocks where a fountain sprung up.

This spring was later named "Sybaris" by the locals, and was the namesake of the city of Sybaris (in what is now Italy), founded by the Locrians.

== Interpretations ==
Although the primary text only refers to the Lamia-Sybaris as a giant beast, and gives no particulars on her physical description regarding any serpentine features, modern commentators have given circumstantial evidence suggesting she was a dragoness, due to paralleling stories of the male dragon Python, that also despoiled the Delphi region.

The second-century geographer Pausanias described a copy of an older painting depicting a landscape in Temesa in which a young man captioned Sybaris is about to be sacrificed to a dusky monster called Lycas (meaning "wolfish").

Antoninus Liberalis gave "Lamia" as an alternate name for the creature, perhaps conflating Sybaris with the better known Lamia.
