= Carnus =

Mythical Greek seer

In Greek mythology, Carnus (also spelled Carneus and Carneius) (Ancient Greek: Κάρνος) was a seer from Acarnania, who was instructed in the art of divination by Apollo. According to the poet Praxilla, he was a son of Europa, who was brought up by Apollo and Leto. Alternatively, he was Apollo's lover and friend in some accounts.

Carnus accompanied the Heraclidae, and was killed by Hippotes with a spear for giving obscure prophecies. Apollo then struck the Dorians with plague; having consulted an oracle, they banished Hippotes from their camp and established a cult of Apollo Carneius with the institution of the Carneia to propitiate the god.
