= Menestratus (Thespiae) =

Hero from Thespiae in Greek mythology

In Greek mythology, Menestratus (/ˌmɛnɪˈstrætəs/; Ancient Greek: Μενέστρατος, romanized: Menéstratos, lit. 'vigorous army') is a Thespian man who dies trying to slay a dragon in an attempt to save his lover from the monster. His story is recounted in Description of Greece, a second-century work by Greek traveller and geographer Pausanias.

== Mythology ==
Menestratus lived in Thespiae, where he met and became lovers with a male youth named Cleostratus. Soon, a great dragon started ravaging their city, and the citizens looked to Zeus for help. The god commanded them to sacrifice a teenage boy each year to the monster, which they did for an undisclosed number of years. When the lot fell to Cleostratus, Menestratus devised a trick in order to save his lover from such fate. He made a bronze breastplate with a fish-hook on each plate, point turned upwards. Clad in the breastplate he willingly offered himself to the dragon, convinced it would kill it. The dragon devoured him, and like Menestratus had predicted, it died indeed, though at the cost of Menestratus' own life. Afterwards, the Thespians erected a bronze cult statue to honour Zeus the Saviour.

== Culture ==
The story bears a lot of similarities to the myth of Alcyoneus and Eurybarus. In both cases a horrifying beast terrorises a place, and a man chooses to confront it in the stead of their love interests, who are the intended sacrificial victims. Unlike Eurybarus however, Menestratus does not survive the ordeal. The lovers being of the same sex is noted to be a rare variant among the many versions of the dragon-slaying fairytale trope.

== See also ==
- Perseus and Andromeda
- Dragonslayer
