= Eurybarus =

Heroic son of Euphemus in Greek mythology

Eurybarus or Eurybaros (Ancient Greek: Εὐρύβαρος), Eurybatos (Εὐρύβατος) or Eurybates (Εὐρυβάτης) was a Greek mythological hero, son of Euphemus and a descendant of the river god Axios.

== Mythology ==
Eurybarus was a young man but brave, and by divine inspiration happened to be coming from Curetis and encountered the young and handsome Alcyoneus as he was being led from Crisa to the cave of the monster Sybaris on Mount Cirphis to be sacrificed to deliver the Delphians from her menace. Falling in love at first sight with him, and asking why they were doing so, Eurybarus realized that he could neither defend him nor let him perish wretchedly. He tore the wreath from Alcyoneus's head, placed it on his own, and gave orders that he himself should be led forward instead.

As soon as he entered the cavern, Eurybarus dragged Sybaris from her den and threw her off the crags. She struck her head against the footings of Crisa and faded from sight. From that rock sprang a fountain, which the locals call Sybaris.

== Analysis ==
The myth corresponds to Aarne-Thompson-Uther Index tale type ATU 300, "The Dragon-Slayer."

It is similar to the legend of the boxer Euthymos except the victim is male and monster is female.

== See also ==
- Menestratus and Cleostratus
- Perseus and Andromeda
