= Timagoras =

Unfortunate lover in Greek mythology

In Greek mythology, Timagoras (Ancient Greek: Τιμαγόρας, romanized: Timagóras) is a foreigner living in Athens, who falls in love with a lovely Athenian boy, Meles. His love is nevertheless rejected by the youth, who depending on versions tasks him to accomplish a number of difficult requests only to turn him down anyway, or bids him to jump from a great height. The spurned Timagoras ends his life the same way in both cases, by flinging himself from the rock of the Athenian Acropolis and finding death at the crags below.

The myth is attested in two main authors, second-century traveller Pausanias, and the author of the Suda, a Byzantine lexicon of the tenth century AD. The myth is one of the several examples of a devoted suitor courting in vain the cruel object of his desire, and eventually taking his life.

== Mythology ==
=== Pausanias ===
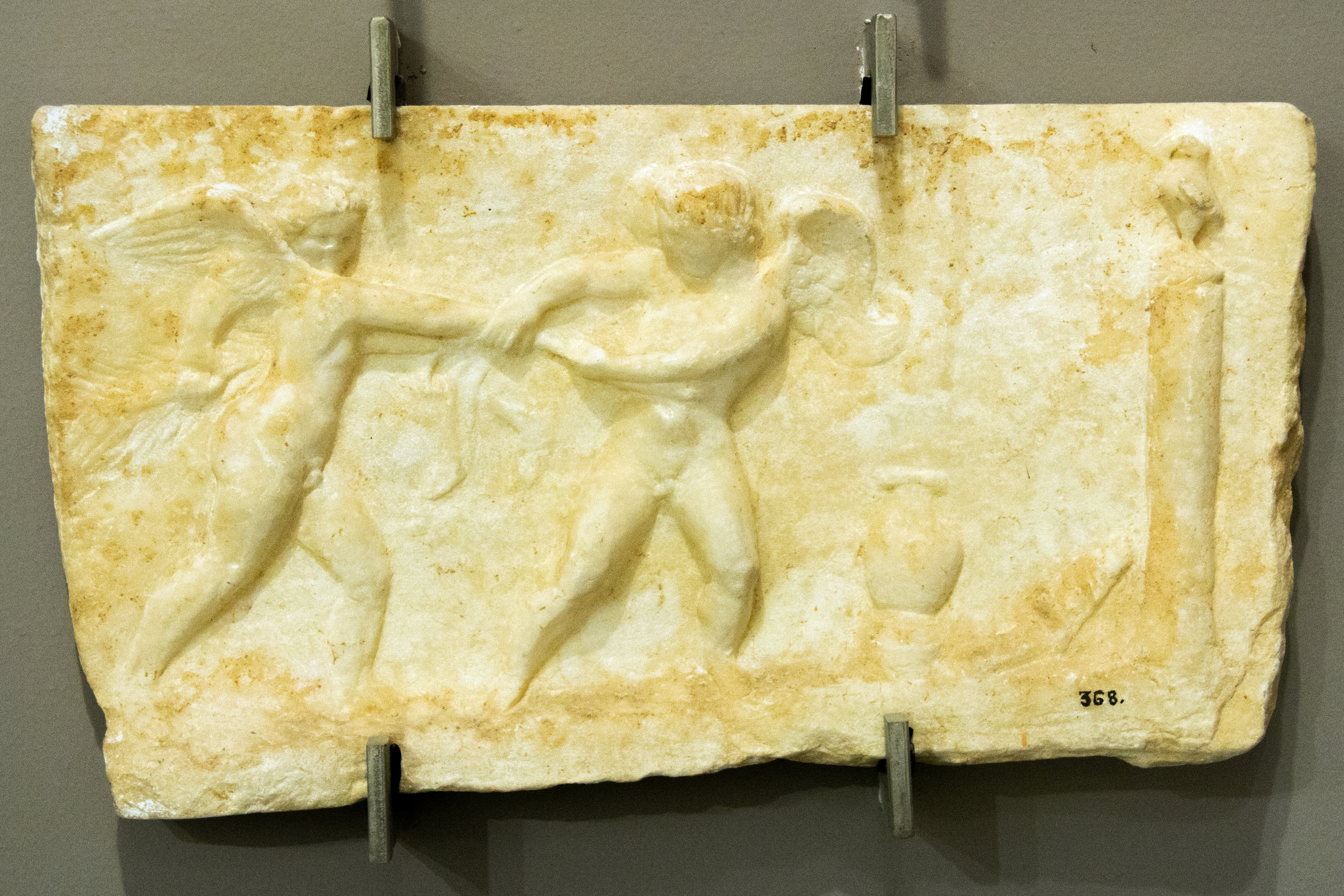
Eros and Anteros on a first-century marble relief from Knossos, Crete.

Timagoras was a foreign-born resident of Athens (a metic, allowed permanent residence but no political rights) who fell in love with a local Athenian boy, Meles. Meles rejected Timagoras' affections however, and challenged him to climb to the highest point of the rock (the Athenian Acropolis) and jump from there. Timagoras little valued his life compared to his wish to fulfill every demand or whim of the boy's, so he obliged and killed himself after falling from great height. When Meles learnt that Timagoras had actually gone through with his suggestion, he was overwhelmed with remorse and guilt. He too then threw himself from the same place and died. The foreign residents of Athens then erected an altar to Anteros, god of mutual love, whorshipped as the avenging spirit of Timagoras.

=== Suda ===
The same tale is elaborated more in the Byzantine encyclopedia Suda, whose author swapped the names of the men involved, with Timagoras becoming the pretty boy and Meletus the unfortunate suitor. According to the encyclopedia, the boy was noble-born and wealthy, with irresistible beauty. But he was also cruel, so when courted, he made his would-be suitor perform a number of tasks for him. First he asked for hunting hounds from a foreign land, then an enemy's well-bred horse, a lovely chlamys owned by someone else and other such things. The last thing he asked for were some birds of a lovely and domesticated breed, and Meletus did bring them to him. But Timagoras, ever disdainful, rejected the gift and the man. Meletus, still in love but also vexed and fed up with the dishonour and the endless trials, took his own life after leaping from the Acropolis.

The goddess of justice, Dike, would not let the boy to gloat and get away with it. The boy took up the birds in his arms, and then, as if by divine intervention dragging him, he too in bad luck threw himself from the rock and perished as well. A statue commemorating the tragedy was put in place, depicting a lovely and nude boy carrying two roosters and throwing himself headlong.

== In ancient culture ==
Although Anteros is sometimes presented as the opposite of his brother Eros, in the story of Timagoras where he (apparently) strikes the indifferent Meles with remorse, he becomes an avenger of love, and thus in league with Eros. Pausanias mentions the altar in conjunction with the Eros statue dedicated by Charmus, a sixth-century BC Greek polemarch said to have been the beloved of Pisistratus and the lover of Pisistratus' son, Hippias. Both variations exist as cult aetia, that is stories explaining the origin of worship-related customs (the altar and the statue).

The myth is a typical tale of pederastic love, whose structure has been characterised as the "hybristic eromenos" type of such stories, paralleling the tales of Narcissus and Leucocomas, where the beloved takes advantage of the erastes' affection and love. Ancient Greek men were expected to court adolescent boys, who might be limited in number or even entirely uninterested in the advances of older men. Those tales seem to constitute moral parables that teach lessons on navigating the sexual relationships between men and teenage boys. Love of boys was encouraged, but it could be dangerous if inappropriate, especially when it came to those on the younger side who were seen as more impulsive or lacking judgement, in need of moral lessons on pride, cruelty and thoughtfulness. Meles, a meirakion, would have been around the ages of thirteen to twenty.

Antoninus Liberalis and Ovid record a similar myth in which a man named Phylius undertakes a number of tasks for the sake of the unimpressed Cycnus, only to fall out of love eventually, and Cycnus to transform into a swan after jumping off of a cliff.

== See also ==
Other cases of love rejection in Greek mythology:

- Coresus and Callirhoë
- Arceophon and Arsinoe
- Iphis and Anaxarete

== Bibliography ==
- Antoninus Liberalis, The Metamorphoses of Antoninus Liberalis translated by Francis Celoria (Routledge 1992). Online version at the Topos Text Project.
- Calimach, Andrew (2023). "The Boy-Lover's Leap: The Tangled Tale of Timagoras and Meletus". academia.edu.
- Calimach, Andrew (2022). "The Dangerous Meirakiskós". academia.edu.
- Crompton, Louis (October 2006). Homosexuality and Civilization. Harvard University Press. ISBN 978-0-674-01197-7.
- Frazer, James G. (1898). Pausanias's Description of Greece. Vol. 2: Commentary on Book I. Cambridge University Press.
- Frey, Alexandra (October 1, 2006). "Meles". In Cancik, Hubert; Schneider, Helmuth (eds.). Brill's New Pauly. Translated by Christine F. Salazar. Basle: Brill Reference Online. ISSN 1574-9347.
- Grant, Michael; Hazel, John (August 2, 2004). Who's Who in Classical Mythology. London and New York: Routledge. ISBN 0-415-26041-8.
- Grimal, Pierre (1987). The Dictionary of Classical Mythology. Wiley-Blackwell. ISBN 0-631-13209-0.
- Hard, Robin (2004). The Routledge Handbook of Greek Mythology: Based on H. J. Rose's "Handbook of Greek Mythology". Routledge. ISBN 9780415186360.
- Kinsey, Brian (January 2012). Gods and Goddesses of Greece and Rome. Cavendish Square Publishing, LLC. ISBN 978-0-7614-7951-2.
- Licht, Hans (2012). Dawson, Lawrence H. (ed.). Sexual Life In Ancient Greece. Translated by J. H. Freese. Routledge. ISBN 978-0-7103-0702-6.
- Oswalt, Sabine G. (1969). Concise Encyclopedia of Greek and Roman mythology. Glasgow: Collins sons & Co. Ltd.
- Ovid (2000). Metamorphoses. Translated by Anthony S. Kline. Borders Classics. ISBN 9781587261565.
- Pausanias, Description of Greece with an English Translation by W.H.S. Jones, Litt.D., and H.A. Ormerod, M.A., in 4 Volumes. Cambridge, MA, Harvard University Press; London, William Heinemann Ltd. 1918. Online version at the Perseus Digital Library.
- Rose, Herbert J. (2004). A Handbook of Greek Mythology (6th ed.). London, New York: Routledge. ISBN 0-415-04601-7.
- Smith, William (1873). A Dictionary of Greek and Roman Biography and Mythology. London, UK: John Murray, printed by Spottiswoode and Co. Online version at the Perseus.tufts library.
- Stephenson, Craig E. (August 2019). Anteros: A Forgotten Myth. Routledge. ISBN 978-0-415-57230-9.
- Sudas, Suda, translated and edited by several authors, including Jennifer Benedict. Suda on Line.
