= Euxynthetus =

Cretan man in Greek mythology

In Greek mythology, Euxynthetus (Ancient Greek: Εὐξύνθετος, romanized: Euxúnthetos, lit. 'well-built') or Promachus (Ancient Greek: Πρόμαχος, romanized: Prómakhos, lit. 'first in battle') is a Cretan hero, enamoured hopelessly with the beautiful youth Leucocomas, who did not reciprocate his love but made him carry out a number of mock trials with the false promise to reward him with his affections.

Although the story of Euxynthetus and his unrequited love enjoyed much popularity during the Roman times, today it is mostly lost, and only disconnected surviving fragments are left to give a glimpse of the original narrative.

== Etymology ==
Euxynthetus' name is a compound word made up from the prefix εὐ- ("well" or "good"), ξυν a variation of συν ("together"), the stem -θε- from the verb τίθημι ("to put, to place") and the masculine suffix -τος. It thus translates to 'well-put together', 'well-knit' and hence denotes good physique and muscle mass.

In one author his name is Promachus, translating to 'first in battle' or 'he who fights in the front lines.' It was a very common epithet of Athena, the goddess of war.

== The story ==
Every full narrative of the story of Euxynthetus has been lost, and his myth can only be pieced together from the various fragments and passing references in surviving works. The tale might be as old as at least Aristotle, and was included in On Love, a lost work by the poet Theophrastus who lived during the fourth and third centuries BC. A fragmentary papyrus from Oxyrhynchus was found with a segment containing a full narrative on Euxynthetus and Leucocomas, of which only the opening lines are preserved.

As far as we can reconstruct, the story went like this; Euxynthetus and Leucocomas, a young and lovely adolescent, were natives of the island of Crete from either Leben or Knossos. Euxynthetus was deeply in love with the handsome boy, but the unimpressed and disdainful Leucocomas was less enthusiastic about him. Leucocomas bid Euxynthetus to bring about a number of increasingly hard tasks, which Euxynthetus gladly undertook in vain hope that he would have success with the boy if he did as told.

No full narrative of what those quests entailed, and the manner Euxynthetus accomplished them, survives. It is known that one of them was for Euxynthetus to fetch Leucocomas' dog back from Praesus. The final one included retrieving a renowned helmet and bringing it to him. Euxynthetus obtained the helmet, but by that point he had grown to dislike Leucocomas and his antics. So when he returned with the helmet, he placed it not on Leucocomas but on the head of another handsome young man while Leucocomas watched. Leucocomas, unable to control his jealousy, killed himself with his sword.

== In culture ==
Fourth-century BC philosopher Aristotle might have referred to this story when he used an unclear myth as an example in his expertise on recklessness versus cowardy, writing that "[I]f a man is in love he is more reckless than cowardly, and endures many dangers, like the man [...] from Crete in the myth." Plutarch seems to imply that the god of desire Eros had a role in the story as the avenger of outraged lovers who is quick to punish those ill-mannered in love.

Another similar myth is recorded by Antoninus Liberalis and Ovid, writing of a man named Phylius, who carried about several tasks in order to impress the good-looking Cycnus, only to fall out of love eventually because of the boy's frivolousness, while Cycnus transformed into a swan after jumping off of a cliff afterwards. Those tales also parallel the twelve labours Heracles had to carry out for Eurystheus. Graham Anderson recognises in it a folktale element of a person performing a task for another, who is bad-behaved.

=== Ancient Greek pederastic love ===
Young adult Greek men would court teenage boys to become their lovers, and were expected to grant expensive gifts and wisdom to them, in return for their affections. In Crete it was customary for the would-be lover to ritually abduct his object of desire with the help of the boy's friends (and the father's approval by necessity), and spend two months hunting and feasting in seclusion, after which he would gift the boy a military garb, an ox and a drinking cup, and several other costly presents later.

Men's courtship of adolescent boys was a result of the unavailability of women, but those youths themselves could be limited in number or even entirely uninterested in the advances of older men. Much like the lover, the beloved also had an etiquette he was expected to follow. In some parts of Greece, such as Classical Athens, the beloved should show restraint at first by resisting the ardent lover and present himself as hard to win over, just like women were expected to behave in heterosexual courtships. This was done to preserve the younger male's honour and reputation, who would yield at the right time and not show himself as impatient. The beloved was expected to give in eventually and not torment the lover for an eternity, at least in the periods and places where those behaviours were part of the norm.

Andrew Calimach describes the myth as a typical tale of pederastic love of the "hubristic eromenos" structure, also seen in the tales of Narcissus–Ameinias and Meles–Timagoras, in both of which the erastes and his conditionless devotion are taken advantage by a self-absorbed eromenos who endangers the life of the would-be suitor due to his arrogance and hubris. These types of myths probably attempted to teach lessons on navigating the sexual relationships between men and teenage boys, and warn youths of the dangers of their pride, cruelty and thoughtfulness.

== See also ==
Opposite-sex myths of rejection in Greek legend:

- Callirhoë
- Arsinoe
- Gorgo

== Bibliography ==
- Anderson, Graham (2000). Fairytale in the Ancient World. Routledge. ISBN 978-0-415-23702-4.
- Antoninus Liberalis, The Metamorphoses of Antoninus Liberalis translated by Francis Celoria (Routledge 1992). Online version at the Topos Text Project.
- Aristotle, Eudemian Ethics in Aristotle in 23 Volumes, Vol. 20, translated by H. Rackham. Cambridge, MA, Harvard University Press; London, William Heinemann Ltd. 1981. Available at Perseus Digital Library.
- Calimach, Andrew (2023). "The Boy-Lover's Leap: The Tangled Tale of Timagoras and Meletus". academia.edu.
- Calimach, Andrew (2022). "The Dangerous Meirakiskós". academia.edu.
- Calimach, Andrew (2021). "The Greek Myth of Muscleman and Blondie". academia.edu.
- Cantarella, Eva (1992). Bisexuality in the Ancient World. Yale University Press. ISBN 0-300-04844-0.
- Celoria, Francis (1992). The Metamorphoses of Antoninus Liberalis: A Translation with a Commentary. Routledge. ISBN 0-415-06896-7.
- Chrystal, Paul (2016). In Bed with the Ancient Greeks. Amberley Publishing Limited. ISBN 9781445654126.
- Conon, Fifty Narrations, surviving as one-paragraph summaries in the Bibliotheca (Library) of Photius, Patriarch of Constantinople translated from the Greek by Brady Kiesling. Online version at the Topos Text Project.
- Fortenbaugh, William; Gutas, Dimitri (2011). Theophrastus of Eresus Commentary. Vol. 6.1: Sources on Ethics. Leiden, Boston: BRILL. ISBN 978-90-04-19422-9.
- Grenfell, Bernard P.; Hunt, Arthur S., eds. (1922). The Oxyrhynchus Papyri (PDF). Vol. XV. England, UK: Egypt Exploration Society.
- Koehl, Robert B. (1986). "The Chieftain Cup and a Minoan Rite of Passage". Journal of Hellenic Studies. 106. The Society for the Promotion of Hellenic Studies. JSTOR 629645.
- Ovid (2000). Metamorphoses. Translated by Anthony S. Kline. Borders Classics. ISBN 9781587261565.
- Plutarch, Amatorius in Plutarch's Morals, translated from the Greek by several hands. Corrected and revised by. William W. Goodwin, Ph.D. Boston. Little, Brown, and Company. Cambridge. Press Of John Wilson and son. 1874. 4. Available online on Perseus Digital Library.
- Rose, Herbert J. (2004). A Handbook of Greek Mythology (6th ed.). London, New York: Routledge. ISBN 0-415-04601-7.
- Schmitt, P. (2000), "Athena Apatouria et la ceinture. Les aspects féminins des apatouries à Athènes", Annales: Economies, Societies, Civilisations, London, England: Thames and Hudson
- Strabo, The Geography of Strabo. Edition by H.L. Jones. Cambridge, Mass.: Harvard University Press; London: William Heinemann, Ltd. 1924. Online version at the Perseus Digital Library.
