= Cayster (mythology) =

Greek river-god

- Personification of Cayster river
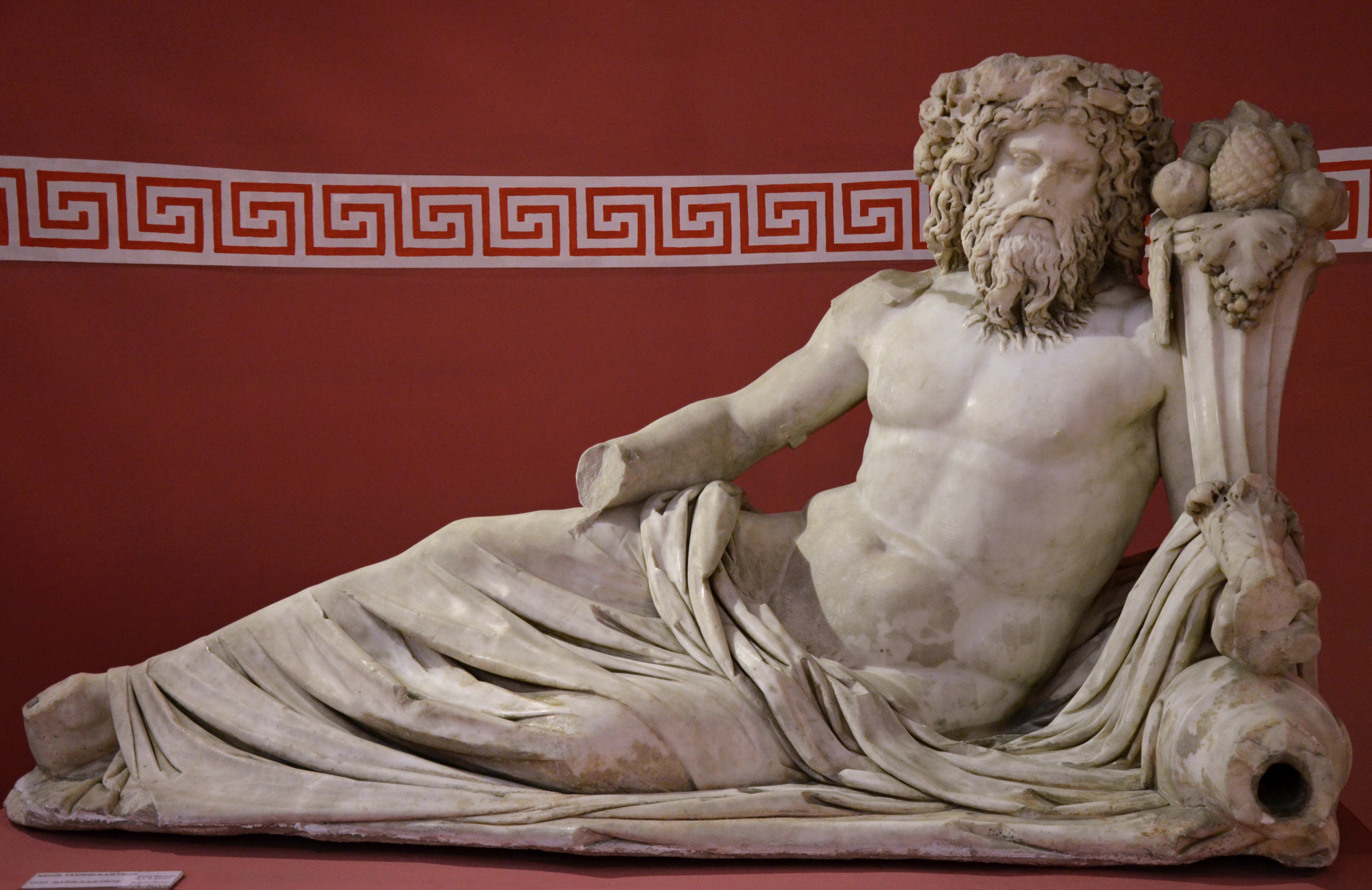
- 2nd-century Roman statue of the reclining river-god Cayster from Smyrna, now in the İzmir Museum of History and Art.
- Abode: Ionia, Lydia

Genealogy
- Children: Ephesus

In Greek mythology, Cayster, also Causter or Caystrus (Ancient Greek: Κάϋστρος, romanized: Káüstros), is a river god, deification of the river by the same name flowing in the regions of Lydia and Ionia. The river is now known as Küçük Menderes ("small Meander"), in modern Turkey.

== Family ==
In the Theogony, Hesiod made the three thousand river-gods the sons of the Titans Oceanus and Tethys, though Cayster is not mentioned by name among them. Cayster was the father of Ephesus, who gave his name to the nearby city of Ephesus, and later along with Coresus founded the sanctuary of Ephesian Artemis.

== Mythology ==
According to a late version, the Cayster actually took its name from a mortal named Cayster, son of the Amazon Penthesilea, who married Derceto in Ascalon and had Semiramis by her.

While describing the disastrous ride and fall of Phaethon from the sun-chariot, Philostratus the Elder noted that the swans scattering around would sing the tale to Cayster and Ister.

== Worship ==
According to Strabo, Cayster had a hero-temple shared with the hero Asios very close to the homonymous river.

== Bibliography ==
- Hesiod, Theogony, in The Homeric Hymns and Homerica with an English Translation by Hugh G. Evelyn-White, Cambridge, MA., Harvard University Press; London, William Heinemann Ltd. 1914. Online version at the Perseus Digital Library.
- Pausanias, Description of Greece with an English Translation by W.H.S. Jones, Litt.D., and H.A. Ormerod, M.A., in 4 Volumes. Cambridge, MA, Harvard University Press; London, William Heinemann Ltd. 1918. Online version at the Perseus Digital Library.
- Philostratus the Elder, Imagines, translated by A. Fairbanks, Loeb Classical Library No, 256. Harvard University Press, Cambridge, Massachusetts. 1931. ISBN 978-0674992825. Internet Archive
- Strabo, The Geography of Strabo, edition by H.L. Jones. Cambridge, Mass.: Harvard University Press; London: William Heinemann, Ltd. 1924. Online version at the Perseus Digital Library.
