= Callirhoë (Calydonian woman) =

Calydonian maiden in Greek mythology

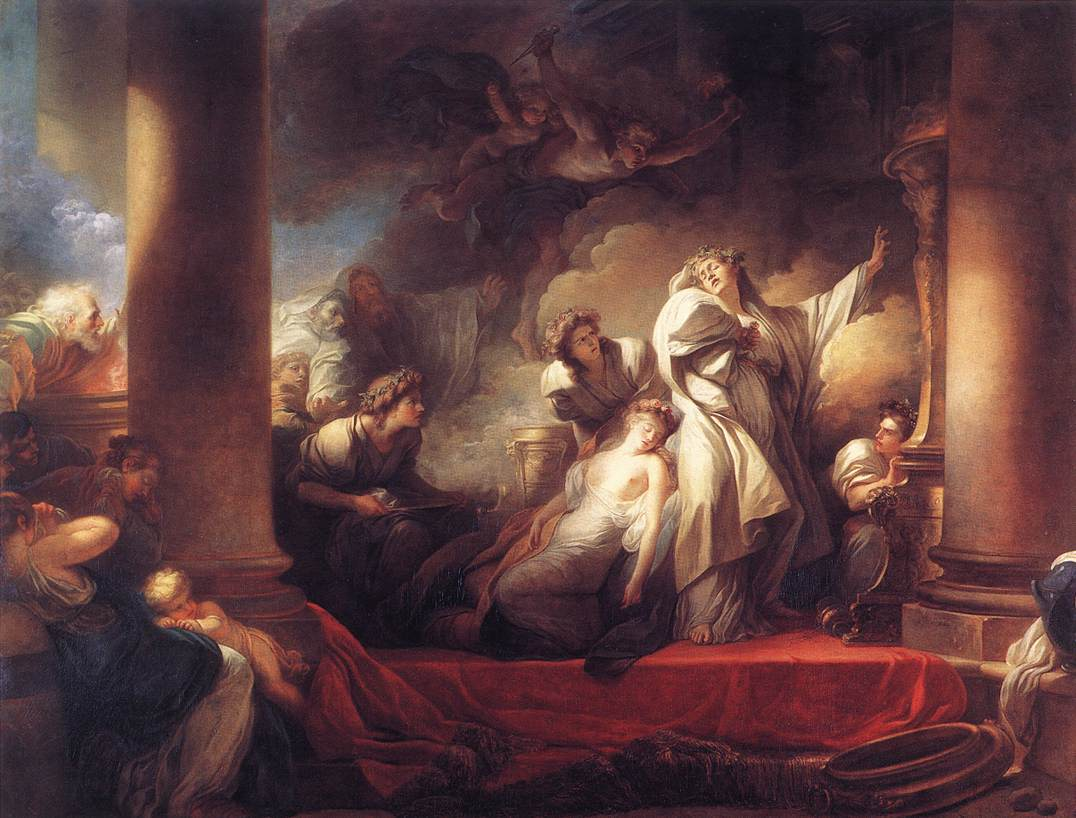
Coresus Sacrificing Himself to Save Callirhoe, oil-on-canvas by Jean-Honoré Fragonard, 1765.

In Greek mythology, Callirhoë (/kəˈlɪroʊiː/; Ancient Greek: Καλλιρόη, romanized: Kallirhóē, lit. 'beautiful-flowing') is a beautiful maiden from Calydon, an ancient Greek kingdom. Callirhoë was loved by a priest named Coresus but her rejection of him caused a horrific plague to ravage Calydon by the wrath of Dionysus, the god that Coresus served. The curse would only be lifted if Callirhoë was sacrificed to the god. Her myth is preserved in the writings of Pausanias, a Greek traveller of the second century AD.

Although little-known and not as notable as others, Callirhoë's myth found its audience during the early modern period and the Renaissance, inspiring a number of works among western artists, including plays, operas, poetry and paintings.

== Etymology ==
Callirhoë's name is the feminine spelling of the ancient Greek noun καλλίρροος, which translates to "flowing beautifully," a compound word from the words καλός ("beautiful") and ῥοή ("stream", "flow").

== Mythology ==
Callirhoë was a beautiful maiden living in Calydon, a city-state in southwestern Greece, who attracted the attention of Coresus, a priest of Dionysus Calydonius. But Coresus' boundless love for Callirhoë could only be matched by Callirhoë's own disdain toward him, since the girl wanted nothing to do with the priest. Despite Coresus' many prayers and promises to her, Callirhoë would not be swayed and kept rejecting him.

Coresus then begged Dionysus himself (apparently for revenge instead of assistance), and the angered god sent a terrible, raging plague to Calydon. The inflicted people would rave around as if intoxicated, and eventually succumb to the disease and die. The suffering Calydonians consulted the oracle of Zeus and Dione at Dodona, the oracle preferred at Aetolia, and were informed that this was the madness-inducing disease was the result of Dionysus' wrath, which would only cease if Callirhoë, or anyone else willing to take her place, was sacrificed to him by Coresus himself.

Callirhoë tried but failed to find a way out of the dire situation, as the oracle's instructions were clear. Finding no one else to substitute her she appealed to her parents, but they too refused to take her place leaving the city no other option but to sacrifice Callirhoë. The altar was prepared for the occasion, and Callirhoe led to it like an animal, but still despite all his resentment Coresus could not bring himself to slay her. Instead he drew his knife at himself, and died in her place as a proxy, for his love had been genuine and outweighed his bitterness.

As Callirhoë watched Coresus' body lying lifeless on the ground, she was overcome with pity for the unfortunate priest. In shame of her past actions she cut her own throat by the Calydonian spring not far from the harbour, which was called 'Callirhoe' after her thereafter. The plague was presumably ended too.

== Interpretation ==
The myth is a typical example of Dionysus inflicting destructive and collective mania ("madness"), his most common way of punishing mortals who displease him; the entire city is punished for the humiliation his priest suffers, and in the end Dionysus is not only responsible for the girl’s death but for that of his own priest Coresus as well. Robert Bell thinks that Callirhoë's tale, who suffers a rather unfair treatment due to a man's wounded pride, as well as myths similar to that one, show a hint of male chauvinism, and that Callirhoe might have even killed herself to avoid condemnation and hostility from the rest of the Calydonians.

The aetiological elements of the tale concern the cult image that Coresus prays to, which was eventually housed in the sanctuary of Dionysus Calydonius in the city of Patrae, on the opposite side of the strait, before being looted by the Romans during the first century BC. The myth was also likely used to explain the name of the lovely-flowing spring near Calydon.

Callirhoë's case is not unlike that of King Admetus, who was given a chance to escape death provided that someone else was willing to take his place, only for nobody but his wife to accept to do so.

== In western culture ==
Although Callirhoë has no presence in classical iconography, poetry or theatre, starting with the early modern period, the myth of Callirhoe has influenced a number of works by several western artists, who incorporated traces of her story in their art, or even adapted it as a whole.

Callirhoë's myth inspired the characters of Aminta and Lucrina in Giovanni Battista Guarini's tragicomedy Il pastor fido, whose tragic tale is narrated early in the play by the protagonists, who face a dilemma between love and duty to the state. It also influenced Luca Marenzio's lyrical madrigal, who expanded upon the play's brief mention of the story of Aminta; like in the Greek myth, Aminta asks a deity (in this case Diana, goddess of the wild) to avenge him after his rejection by Lucrina, but chooses to kill himself rather than sacrifice the girl. As he lies dying, Lucrina suddenly experiences a love epiphany, and joins him in death using his blade. Meanwhile André Cardinal Destouches' 1712 opera Callirhoé deviated a bit from Pausanias' writing, as in it the princess Callirhoé is unhappily betrothed to Corésus, the high priest of Bacchus, but he orders his priests to wreck the city with fire after he catches her with her beloved. The play is more of a historical drama, stripped of the supernatural element, with themes of abuse of power by the phanatical clergy.

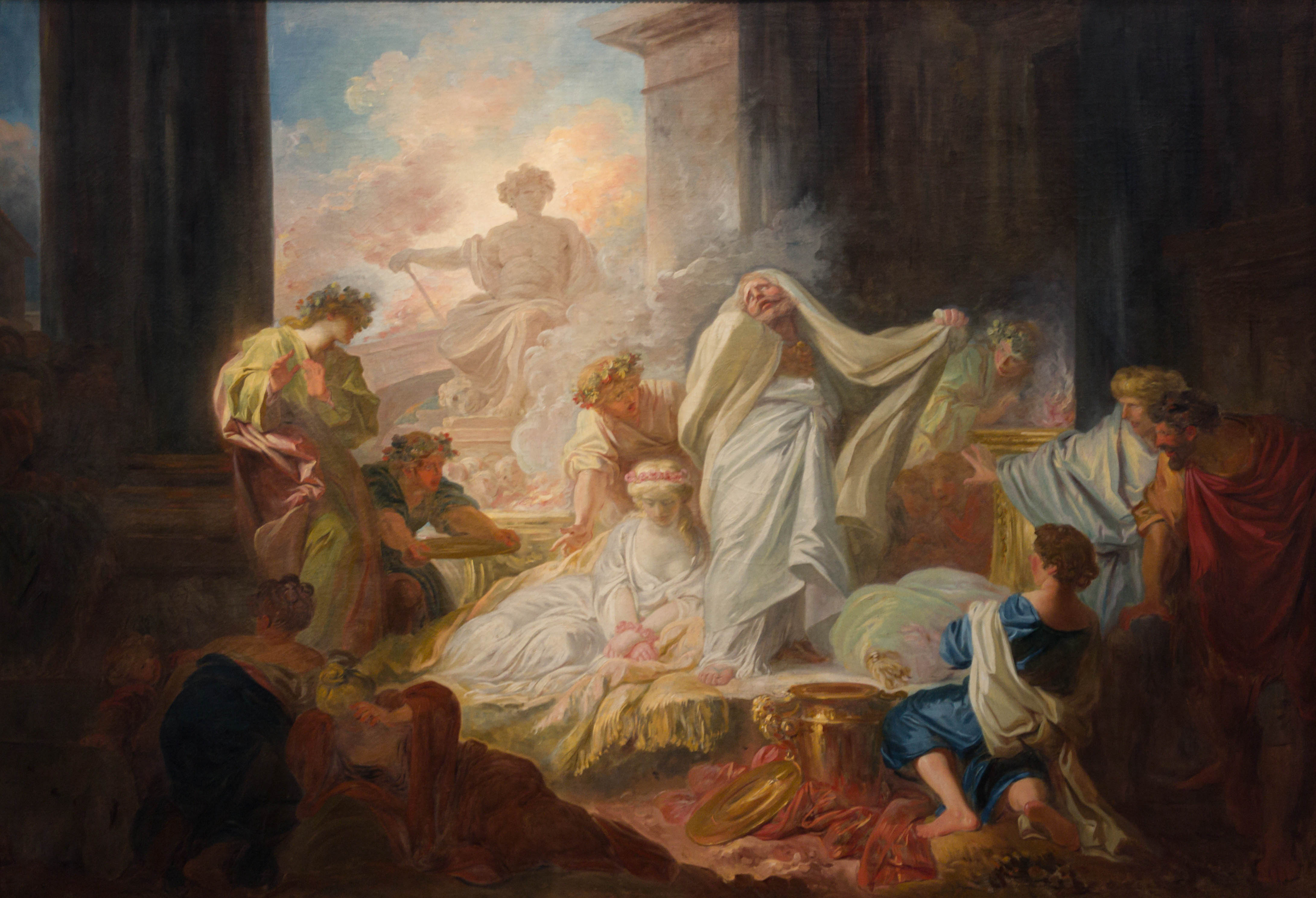
Coresus and Callirhoe, oil sketch. Musée des Beaux-Arts d'Angers.

The moment of Coresus' sacrifice in place of Callirhoë is the subject of Jean-Honoré Fragonard's painting Coresus Sacrificing Himself to Save Callirhoe, first exhibited in 1765 and now kept in the Louvre. Coresus, portrayed as an androgynous youth, plunges the knife into his own chest, and Callirhoë has fainted next to the tripod, a scene designed to invoke strong impressions; the painting sparked an interest for the myth of Callirhoë to many other artists who produced their own paintings. Although the painting did enjoy a lot of praise, it also received criticism, particularly for the figure of Coresus and his effeminate appearance. Meanwhile his preparatory sketch for the work (now in the Musee de Beaux-Arts, Angers) shows a traditional priest with a beard and a moustache who has not yet found his androgynous form, while Callirhoë holds rose garlands and lowers her eyes. Fragonard seems to have reworked the original composition several times.

Callirhoë also inspired poetry; the English poet Walter Savage Landor treated her tale in dramatic Latin hexameter among several other Greek stories he adapted for his idylls and poems, the Hellenics.

== See also ==
Other people punished for rejecting love:

- Narcissus
- Arsinoe
- Rhodopis and Euthynicus
- Anaxarete

== Bibliography ==
- Anonymous (1822). Valpay, A. J. (ed.). "Notice of Idyllia Heroica Decem". The Classical Journal. 26. London, UK: Whittaker.
- Avery, Catherine B., ed. (1962). New Century Classical Handbook. New York, US: Appleton-Century-Crofts.
- Bell, Robert E. (1991). Women of Classical Mythology: A Biographical Dictionary. ABC-Clio. ISBN 9780874365818.
- Charlton, David (2012). Opera in the Age of Rousseau: Music, Confrontation, Realism. London, UK: Cambridge University Press. ISBN 978-0-521-88760-1.
- Coluzzi, Seth J. (2023). Guarini's 'Il pastor fido' and the Madrigal: Voicing the Pastoral in Late Renaissance Italy. NYC, NY: Routledge. ISBN 978-1-138-20709-7.
- Grant, Michael; Hazel, John (August 2, 2004). Who's Who in Classical Mythology. London and New York: Routledge. ISBN 0-415-26041-8.
- Grimal, Pierre (1987). The Dictionary of Classical Mythology. Wiley-Blackwell. ISBN 0-631-13209-0.
- Hard, Robin (2004). The Routledge Handbook of Greek Mythology: Based on H. J. Rose's "Handbook of Greek Mythology". Routledge. ISBN 9780415186360.
- Liddell, Henry George; Scott, Robert (1940). Stuart Jones, Sir Henry; McKenzie, Roderick (eds.). A Greek-English Lexicon. Oxford: Clarendon Press. Online version at Perseus.tufts project.
- Keightley, Thomas (1838). The Mythology of Ancient Greece and Italy (2nd ed.). London, UK: Whittaker and Co.
- Landor, Walter Savage (1859). The Hellenics of Walter Savage Landor. T. Griffin and Co.
- March, Jennifer R. (May 31, 2014). Dictionary of Classical Mythology. Oxbow Books. ISBN 978-1-78297-635-6.
- Pausanias, Description of Greece with an English Translation by W.H.S. Jones, Litt.D., and H.A. Ormerod, M.A., in 4 Volumes. Cambridge, MA, Harvard University Press; London, William Heinemann Ltd. 1918. Online version at the Perseus Digital Library.
- Roman, Luke; Roman, Monica (2010). Encyclopedia of Greek and Roman Mythology. Infobase Publishing. ISBN 9781438126395.
- Rosenberg, Pierre (1988). Fragonard. NYC, US: Metropolitan Museum of Art. ISBN 0-87099-516-2.
- Sheriff, Mary D. (2008). Moved by Love. University of Chicago Press. ISBN 978-0-226-75287-7.
- Smith, William (1873). A Dictionary of Greek and Roman Biography and Mythology. London, UK: John Murray, printed by Spottiswoode and Co. Online version at the Perseus.tufts library.
- Tripp, Edward (June 1970). Crowell's Handbook of Classical Mythology (1st ed.). Thomas Y. Crowell Co. ISBN 069022608X.
- Ustinova, Yulia (2018). Divine Mania: Alteration of Consciousness in Ancient Greece. NYC, New York: Routledge. ISBN 978-1-138-29811-8.
- Zingg, Reto (October 1, 2006). "Callirhoe". In Cancik, Hubert; Schneider, Helmuth (eds.). Brill's New Pauly. Translated by Christine F. Salazar. Basle: Brill Reference Online. ISSN 1574-9347.
