= Nisus =

Nisus or Nisos may refer to:

== Classical mythology ==
- Nisus of Nisus and Euryalus, son of Hyrtacus, friend of Euryalus, in Virgil's Aeneid
- Nisos, a king of Megara
- Nisus or Silenus, foster father of Dionysus
- Nisus of Dulichium, son of Aretias, father of Amphinomus, in Book 18 of Homer's Odyssey

== Other uses ==
- HMS Nisus (1810), a Royal Navy 38-gun fifth rate frigate
- French brig Nisus (1805), a Palinure-class brig of the French Navy
- Nisus Writer, a word processor for the Apple Macintosh
- Eurasian sparrowhawk, Accipiter nisus, a small bird of prey in the family Accipitridae
