= Hyria =

Hyria may refer to:

- Hyria (Boeotia), an ancient town in Boeotia
- Hyria (Campania), an ancient town in Campania, a short distance east of Nuceria Altaferna
- Hyria, a principal Messapian town in ancient Salento, corresponding to the modern town Oria
- Hyria (Cilicia), an ancient city, incorporated by Seleucus I in the 3rd century BC into Silifke, Turkey
- Hyria (lake), near the ancient city of Conope, Aetolia, Greece
- Hyria, a consortium of vocational education in Hyvinkää and Riihimäki, Finland
- Hyria (mythology)
