= Anteros =

Ancient Greek god of returned love

- God of requited love, avenger of unrequited love
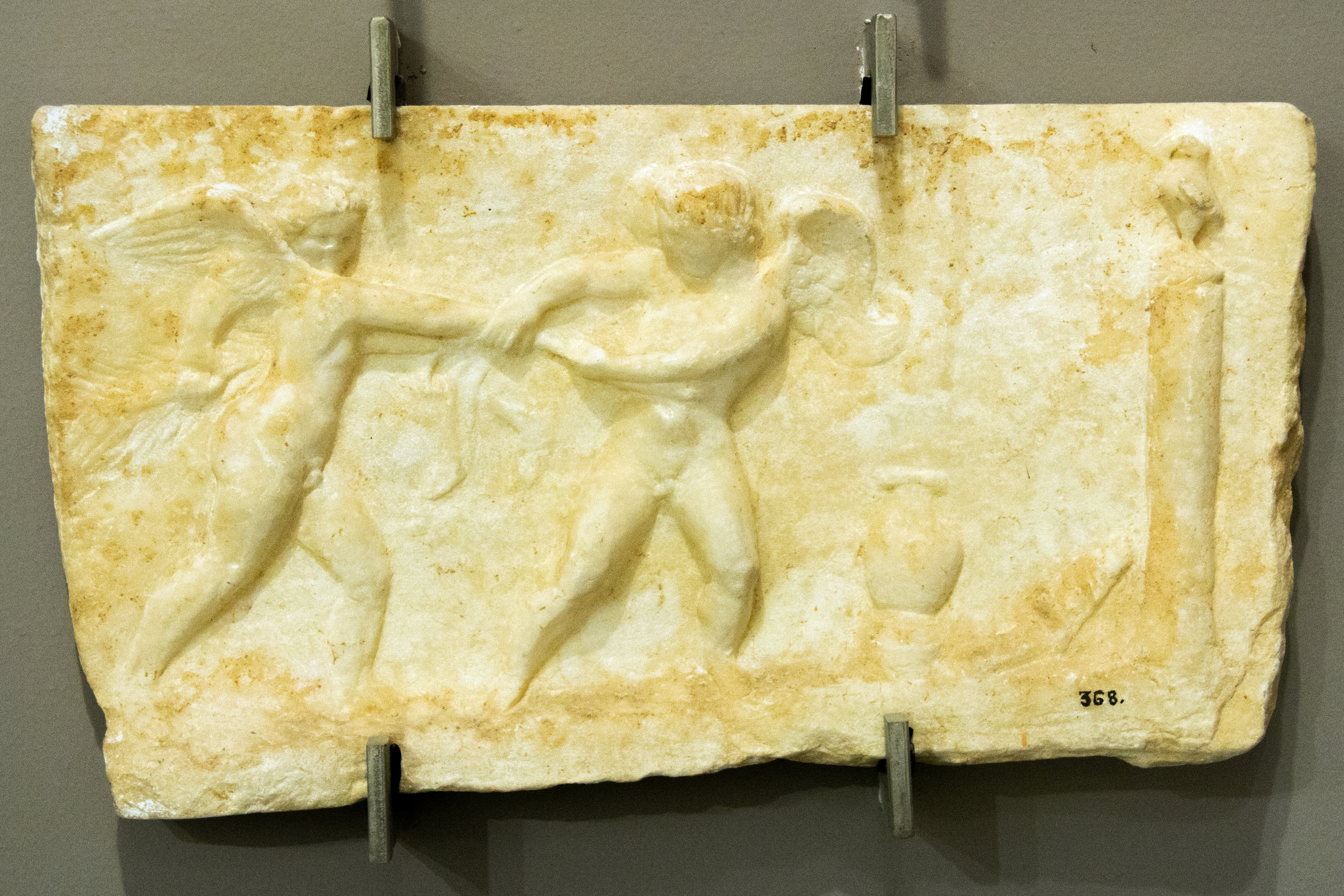
- Anteros with Eros on a second-century AD marble relief from Knossos, Crete.
- Symbol: golden club with arrows of lead

In Greek mythology, Anteros (/ˈæntərɒs/; Ancient Greek: Ἀντέρως, romanized: Antérōs) is the god of requited love (literally "love returned" or "counter-love") and also the punisher of those who scorn love and the advances of others, or the avenger of unrequited love.

== Myth ==
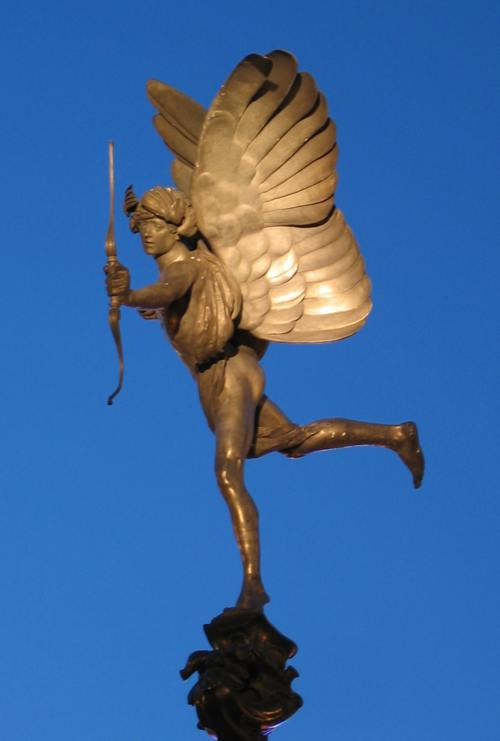
Anteros by Alfred Gilbert, 1893; from the Shaftesbury Memorial Fountain in Piccadilly Circus.

Physically, Anteros is depicted similarly to Eros in almost every way, but with long hair and plumed butterfly wings. He has been described also as armed with either a golden club or arrows of lead. Anteros and Eros are usually depicted as winged boys in the company of Aphrodite or her attendant goddesses.

According to Porphyrius, Aphrodite once complained to Themis that Eros remained a perpetual child, so Themis advised her to give him a brother. Aphrodite then gave birth to Anteros, and whenever he was near Eros, Eros grew. But if Anteros was away, Eros shrank back to his previous, smaller size.

An altar to Anteros was put up by the metics in Athens in commemoration of the spurned love of the metic Timagoras, who was rejected by the Athenian Meles. According to the myth, upon hearing Timagoras' declaration of love for him, the young man mockingly ordered him to throw himself down from the top of a tall rock. Seeing Timagoras dead, Meles repented and threw himself down from the same rock.

Describing the nature of the emotion, Plato asserts that it is the result of the great love for another person. The lover, inspired by beauty, is filled with divine love and "filling the soul of the loved one with love in return." As a result, the loved one falls in love with the lover, though the love is only spoken of as friendship. They experience pain when the two are apart, and relief when they are together, the mirror image of the lover's feelings, is anteros, or "counter-love".

== Legacy ==
Anteros is the subject of the Shaftesbury Memorial Fountain in Piccadilly Circus, London, where he symbolises the selfless philanthropic love of the Earl of Shaftesbury for the poor. The memorial is sometimes given the name The Angel of Christian Charity but is popularly mistaken for Eros.

== See also ==
- Himeros
