= Salius =

Mythical character

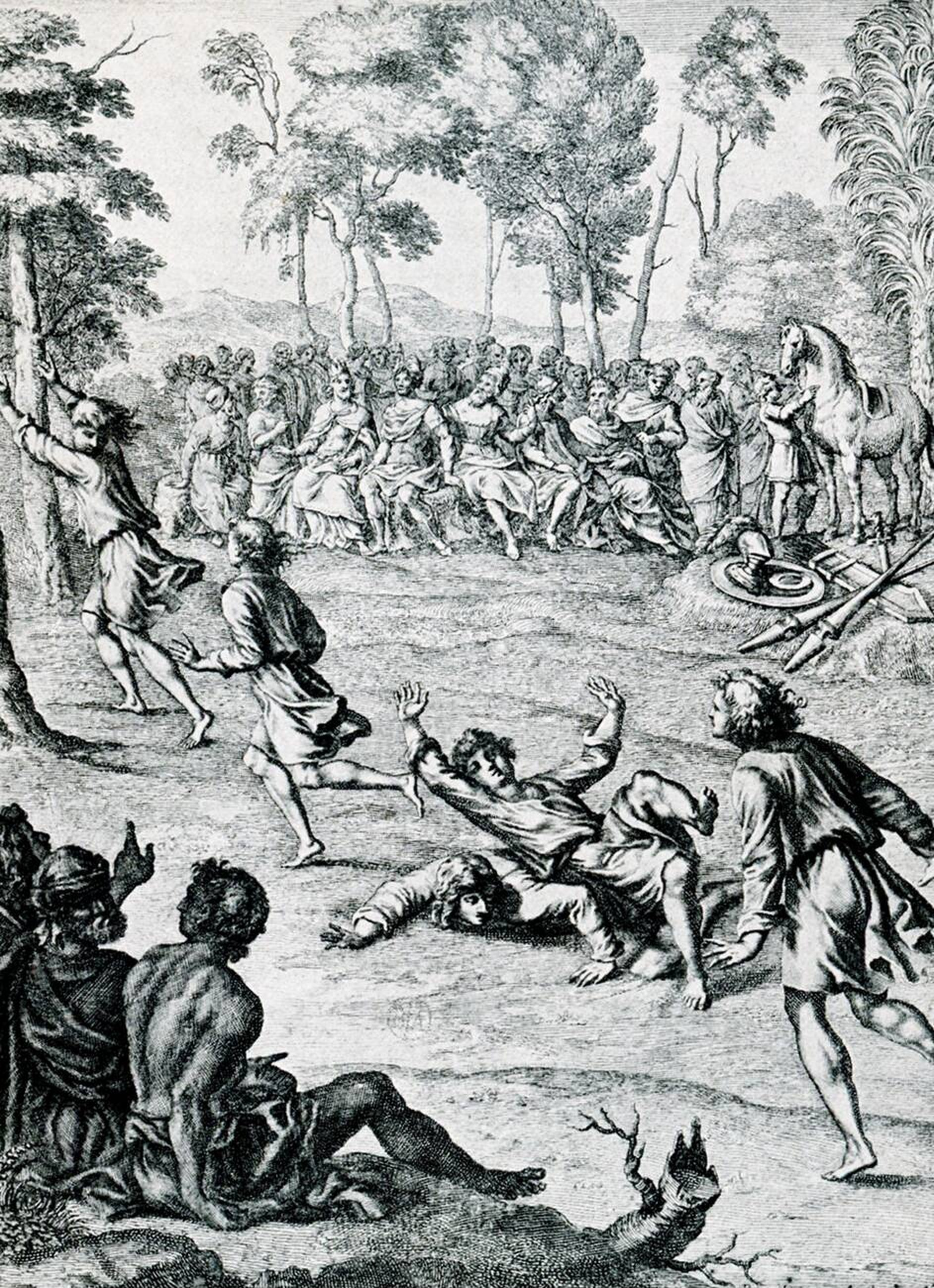
Illustration of the funeral games episode where Nisus fell as he was about to win the foot race, then tripped Salius to ensure that Euryalus would win instead, found in Eva March Tappan's Stories from the Classics, 1907.

In Greek and Roman mythology, Salius is an Acarnanian who in one alternative tradition was the legendary founder of the ancient Roman priesthood of the Salii.

Varro says that Salius had come to Italy with Evander, the Arcadian king to whom several Roman religious institutions were attributed. In Book 5 of the Aeneid, Salius, who lives in Segesta, competes in the funeral games held for Anchises. Salius is among the runners in the footrace, along with Nisus and Euryalus. When the frontrunner Nisus falls, Salius finds himself in the lead, but Nisus trips him deliberately to secure the victory for his friend Euryalus. Salius expresses his indignation at the foul, and receives a fine lion skin as a consolation prize. The episode is given comic treatment, particularly in John Dryden's translation.

Salius remains among the company of Aeneas in Latium. In Aeneid Book 10, he is killed by Nealces in the war against the local population.

The Latin name Salius is the equivalent of Halios (Ἅλιος), the Phaeacian dancer in the Odyssey who loses his athletic competition. Plutarch says that a Salius from Samothrace or Mantinea was reputed to be the legendary founder of the Salian priests, but that the sodality in fact was named from the leaping (Latin salire) of their armed dance.
