= Ephesus (mythology) =

Greek name

In Greek mythology, Ephesus (/ˈɛfɪsəs/, EF-uh-suhs) may refer to two different personages:

- Ephesus, the eponym of the city of Ephesus and the son of the river god Caystrus. Conjointly with the autochthon Coresus, Ephesus was said to have built the temple of Artemis at Ephesus. According to Callimachus' Hypomnemata, Ephesus received Artemis as a guest but when the goddess was driven out by his wife, Artemis transformed her into a dog. Then, taking pity on her, she restored her back into a human. However, the wife, feeling deeply ashamed of what had happened to her, hanged herself. The goddess then placed her own adornment around her and named her Hecate.
- Ephesus, also called Ephesia or Ephos, an Amazon queen who was also said to have founded and gave her name to Ephesus.
