= Biannus =

Coordinates: 35°03′12″N 25°24′36″E

Biannus or Biannos (Ancient Greek: Βιάννος), or Biennus or Biennos (Βίεννος), also Bienna (Βίεννα), was an inland town and polis (city-state) of ancient Crete. It appears, under the form Βίεννα, in the list of 22 cities of Crete of the sixth-century Byzantine geographer Hierocles. According to the Stadiasmus Maris Magni, it was 170 stadia from Hierapytna and 270 stadia from Leben. The Blenna of the Peutinger Table, which is placed at 30 M. P. from Arcadia, and 20 M. P. from Hierapytna, is no doubt the same place. In Hierocles, the name of this city occurs under the form of Bienna. The contest of Otus and Ephialtes with Ares is said to have taken place near this city. From this violent conflict the city is said to have derived its name. The town minted coins in the Hellenistic period, some of which survive.

Its site is located near modern Khorakia, Ano Viannos, a hill northwest of modern Viannos, where remains have been found from the Orientalizing period to Roman times.
