= Ameinias (mythology) =

Figure in Greek mythology

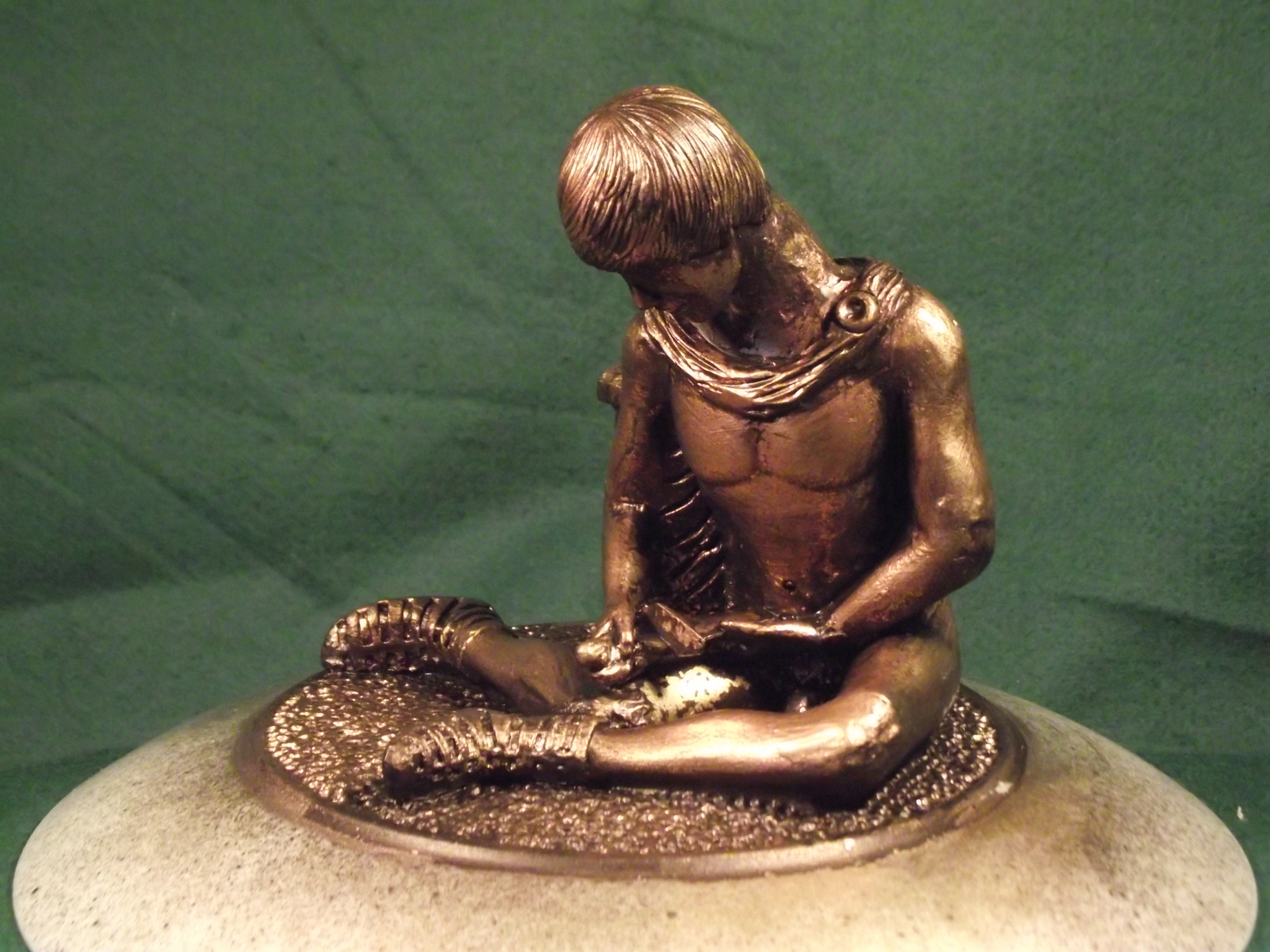
Ameinias, spurned lover of Narcissus. A depiction of Ameinias, sculpted by Malcolm Lidbury for the 2016 Cornwall LGBT History project.

In Greek mythology, Ameinias (Ancient Greek: Ἀμεινίας, romanized: Ameinías) was a young man who fell in love with Narcissus, a handsome hunter from Thespiae in Boeotia, who had already spurned all his other suitors, according to the version of Narcissus's myth by Conon (Narrations, 24).

== Mythology ==
Narcissus also spurned Ameinias and gave him a sword. The latter committed suicide at Narcissus's doorstep after being rejected by him. He had prayed to Nemesis to give Narcissus a lesson for all the pain he provoked. Narcissus walked by a pool of water and decided to drink some. He saw his reflection, became entranced by it, and killed himself because he could not have his object of desire, or gazing endlessly at the image, he slowly pined away and was transformed by the nymphs into a narcissus flower. Others say he was instead filled with remorse for humiliating Ameinias and killed himself beside the pool—and from his dying life's blood the flower was born.

It was said that because of this tragedy, the Thespians came to honor and revere Eros especially among the gods.

Narcissus' name was the ancient Greek word for the narcissus or daffodil flower, and the boy's spurned love Ameinias for the ameinasis. According to Hesychius of Alexandria, ameinasis was another name for the sweet-smelling herb duosmon—either dill, anise or cummin. Presumably he was also transformed into his namesake plant.

== Depictions of Ameinias ==
The BBC TV series Telling Tales retells the Narcissus myth in a modern setting where Narcissus is a handsome, popular kid at his school and Ameinias is his friend.

== See also ==
- Ajax the Great, also killed himself by throwing himself on his sword
- Anethus, also transformed into dill
- Timagoras, who committed suicide after being rejected
