= Coresus =

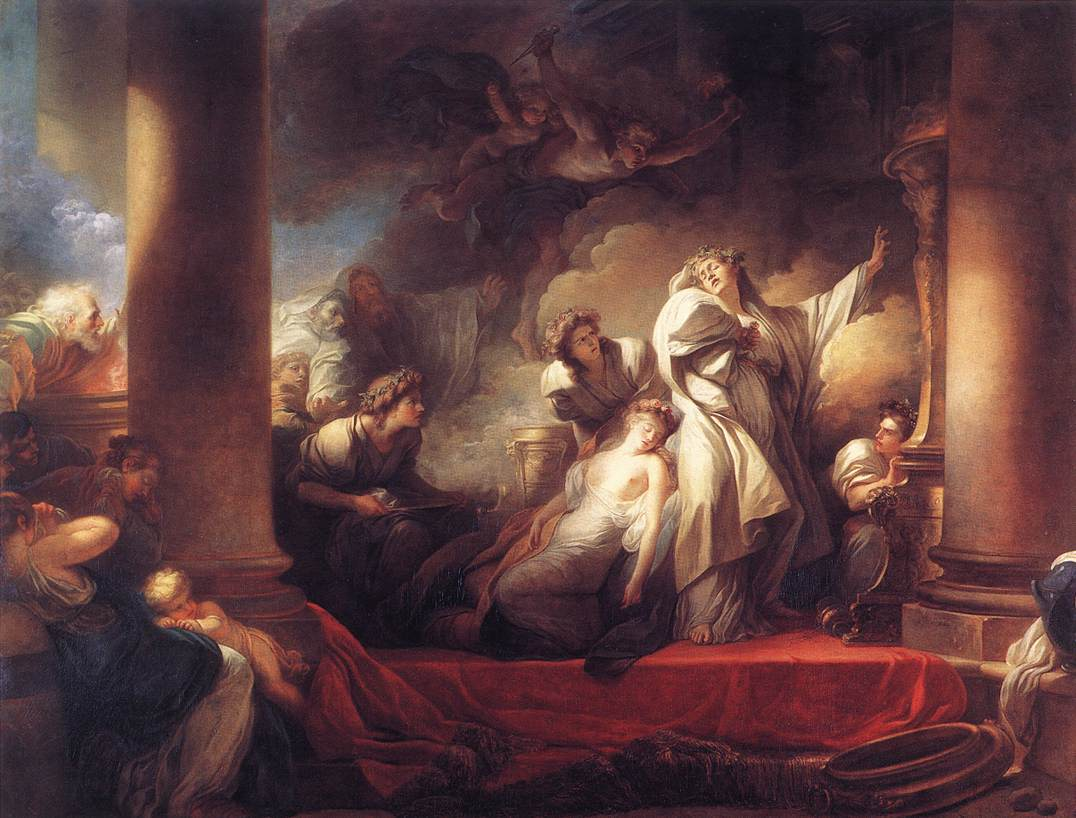
Coresus Sacrificing himself to Save Callirhoe (1765) by Jean-Honoré Fragonard (1732–1806)

In Greek mythology, the name Coresus (Ancient Greek: Κόρησος, romanized: Kórēsos) may refer to:

- Coresus, an autochthon, who, together with Ephesus, son of Cayster, was believed to have founded the sanctuary of the Ephesian Artemis. The Amazons were so closely associated with this sanctuary that, according to Pausanias' remark, Pindar erroneously credited them, and not Coresus and Ephesus, with having founded it.
- Coresus, a priest of Dionysus in Calydon, who was in love with Callirhoë. The girl would not answer her feelings, so Coresus, in despair, prayed to Dionysus that he may be avenged. The population of the city was then struck with a sort of madness that resembled the state of intoxication, which was lethal to many of them. They consulted the oracle at Dodona as to how to put an end to the calamity; the answer was that they had to propitiate the god by sacrificing either Callirhoë or someone who would consent to die instead of her. No one, and not even Callirhoë's foster parents, would do anything to save her life, so she was brought to the altar. Coresus was to perform the sacrificial rite, but, unable to kill his loved one, he slew himself instead. At the sight of him lying dead, Callirhoë was overcome with remorse and, soon after, cut her throat at a spring that later received her name.
