= Cycnus (son of Apollo) =

Son of Apollo in Greek mythology

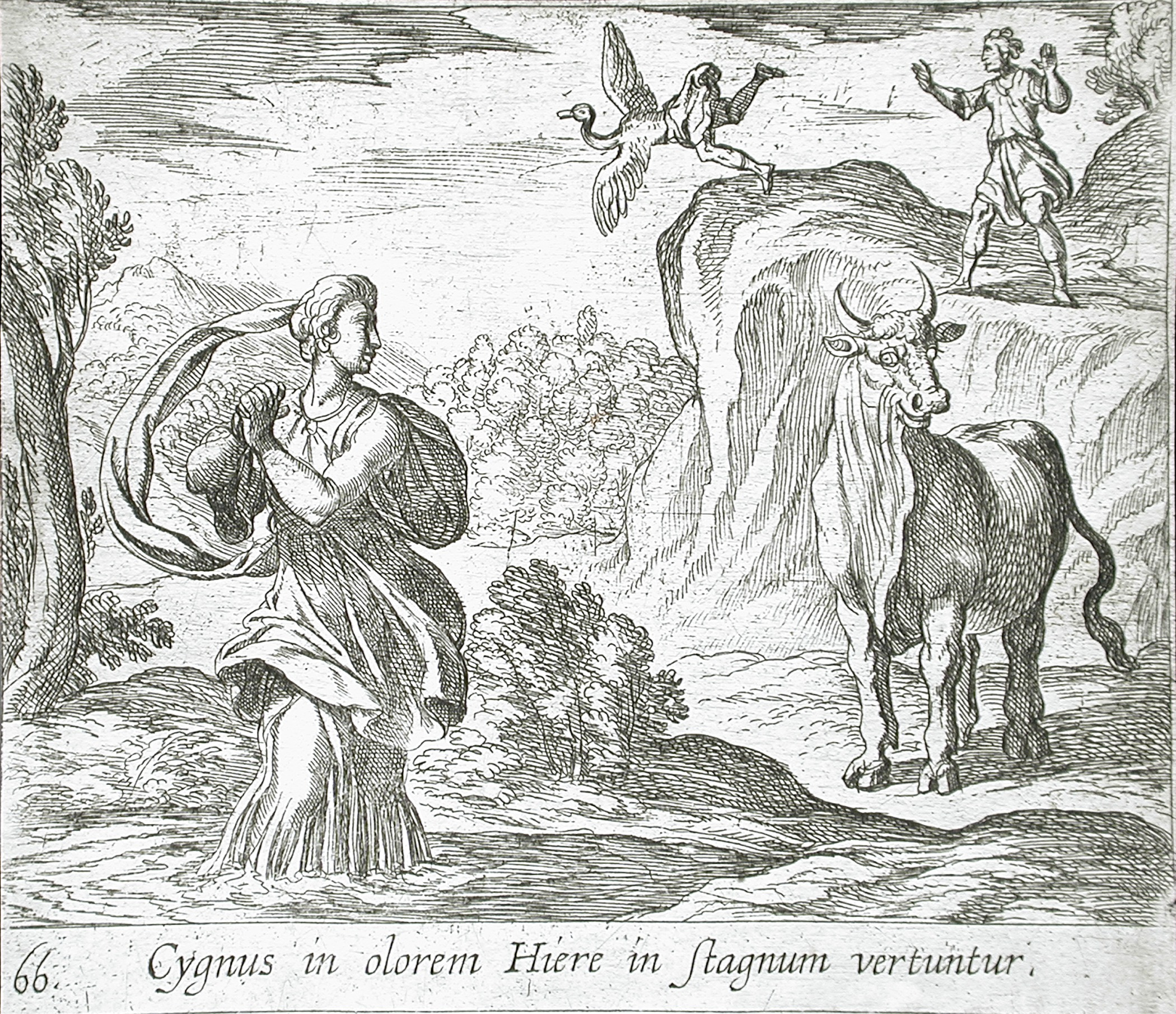
Cycnus and Hyrie by Wilhelm Janson and Antonio Tempesta (1606)

In Greek mythology, Cycnus (Ancient Greek: Κύκνος, romanized: Kyknos, lit. 'swan') or Cygnus was the Aetolian son of Apollo by Hyrie or Thyrie, daughter of Amphinomus.

== Mythology ==
According to Antoninus Liberalis, Cycnus dwelt in the country between Pleuron and Calydon and dedicated most of his time to hunting. He was good-looking but arrogant and disrespectful towards numerous other youths who became enamoured of him and sought his attention. His attitude eventually made all of those youths desert him; only one of them, Phylius by name, loved him deeply enough to stay by his side nevertheless.

Cycnus was still unmoved by Phylius's devotion and challenged him to three impossible tasks, hoping to get rid of him. The first task was to kill a lion that was threatening the neighborhood without use of any weapons. Phylius consumed a lot of food and wine and then vomited it back up on the spot where the lion would usually show up; the beast ate the products and became intoxicated with wine, whereupon Phylius strangled it with his own clothes. The second task was to catch two man-eating vultures of enormous size that were posing an equal threat to the neighborhood, again without use of any devices. While Phylius was contemplating a way to fulfill the task, he saw an eagle accidentally drop its prey, a dead hare, to the ground. Phylius then smeared himself with the hare's blood and lay still on the ground, pretending to be dead. When the vultures attacked him, he caught them by the feet and brought them to Cycnus. Finally, Phylius had to bring a bull to the altar of Zeus with his own bare hands. Not being able to come up with a way to perform this last task, he prayed to Heracles for help. Then he saw two bulls fighting over a heifer and waited till in the course of the fight both fell to the ground and became helpless, which made it possible for him to grab one of the bulls by the legs and drag it to the altar. At this point, Heracles caused Phylius to no more obey the orders of Cycnus. When Cycnus found that, he felt disgraced and committed suicide by throwing himself into a lake called Conope; his mother Thyrie did the same. Apollo changed them both into swans. The lake became known as the Swan Lake because of that, and when Phylius died, he was buried near it.

Ovid also incorporates the story of Cycnus and Phylius in his Metamorphoses: in his version, Phylius performs the three tasks but refuses to deliver the tamed bull to Cycnus. The latter is scorned and throws himself off a cliff, but transforms into a swan as he is falling and flies away. His mother Hyrie, unaware of the transformation and thinking that he is dead, dissolves away in tears, thus changing into the lake Hyrie.

== See also ==
- Timagoras
- Narcissus
- Euxynthetus
