= Anethus =

Greek mythological character

In Greek and Roman mythology, Anethus (Ancient Greek: Ἄνηθος, romanized: Ánēthos, lit. 'dill') is a beautiful youth who undergoes transformation under unclear conditions and becomes a small flowering plant bearing his name, the dill. He and his story is only found in Maurus Servius Honoratus, a Latin grammarian who lived in the fourth and fifth centuries AD.

== Etymology ==
The ancient Greek word for dill (anethum graveolens) is ἄνηθον (ánēthon), a neuter noun. It was also spelled ἄννηθον (ánnēthon), ἄνητον (ánēton) and ἄννητον (ánnēton). According to Robert Beekes it is probably of pre-Greek origin, as are all words ending in a -thos/-thon suffix.

== Mythology ==
The story of Anethus's minor transformation into the dill plant is only found in Servius, who writes that Anethus, much like the poppy and the daffodil, belonged to the class of the beautiful youths that were transformed into the plants bearing their names. Besides this brief mention, the full story of Anethus, his family, his birthplace, the deity responsible and the context behind his transformation has been lost. In ancient Greece anethum was seen by many doctors as a suitable herb for use in cures and remedies, especially for epilepsy.

== See also ==
- Ameinias
- Clytie
- Cyparissus
- Hyacinthus
- Minthe

== Bibliography ==
- Beekes, Robert S. P. (2009). Lucien van Beek (ed.). Etymological Dictionary of Greek. Leiden Indo-European Etymological Dictionary Series. Vol. 1. Leiden, the Netherlands: Brill Publications. ISBN 978-90-04-17420-7.
- Colvin, Stephen (2014). A Brief History of Ancient Greek. Wiley Blackwell. ISBN 978-1-4051-4925-9.
- Forbes Irving, Paul M. C. (1990). Metamorphosis in Greek Myths. Oxford, New York, Toronto: Oxford University Press, Clarendon Press. ISBN 0-19-814730-9.
- Liddell, Henry George; Scott, Robert (1940). A Greek-English Lexicon, revised and augmented throughout by Sir Henry Stuart Jones with the assistance of Roderick McKenzie. Oxford: Clarendon Press. Online version at Perseus.tufts project.
- Maurus Servius Honoratus, In Vergilii carmina comentarii. Servii Grammatici qui feruntur in Vergilii carmina commentarii; recensuerunt Georgius Thilo et Hermannus Hagen. Georgius Thilo. Leipzig. B. G. Teubner. 1881. Online version at the Perseus Digital Library.
