= Nisus and Euryalus =

Pair of lovers in Vergil's Aeneid

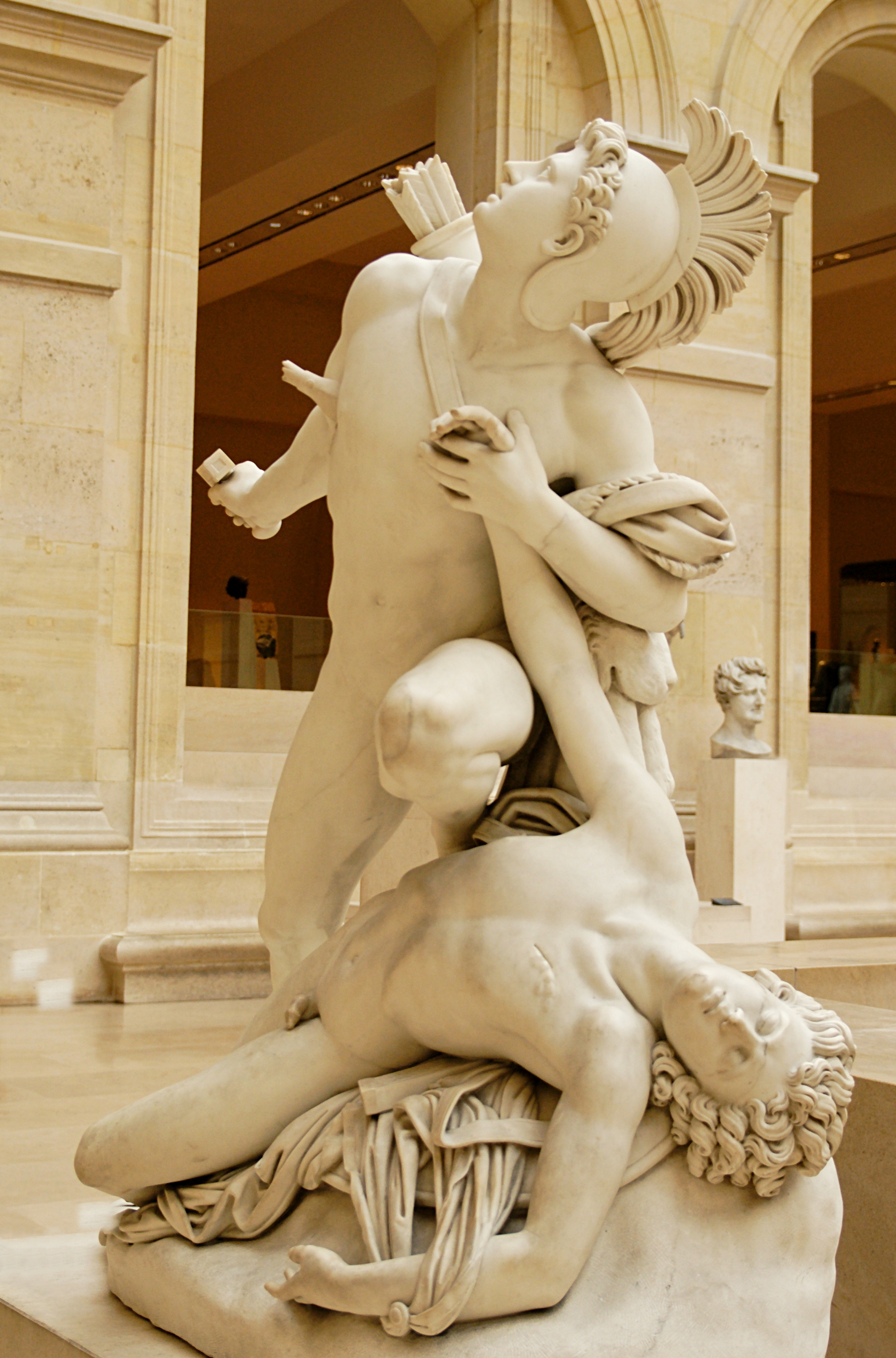
Nisus and Euryalus (1827) by Jean-Baptiste Roman (Louvre Museum)

In Greek and Roman mythology, Nisus (Ancient Greek: Νῖσος, romanized: Nîsos) and Euryalus (/jʊəˈraɪ.ələs/; Ancient Greek: Εὐρύαλος, romanized: Eurýalos, lit. 'broad') are two young warriors serving under Aeneas in the Aeneid, the Augustan epic by Virgil. Their foray among the enemy, narrated in book nine, demonstrates their stealth and prowess as warriors, but ends as a tragedy: the loot Euryalus acquires (a glistening Rutulian helmet) attracts attention, and the two die together. Virgil presents their deaths as a loss of admirable loyalty and valor. They also appear in Book 5, during the funeral games of Anchises, where Virgil takes note of their amor pius, a love that exhibits the pietas that is Aeneas's own distinguishing virtue.

In describing the bonds of devotion between the two youths, Virgil draws on conventions of erotic poetry that have suggested a romantic relationship, interpreted by scholars in light of the Greek custom of paiderastia, in which their amor pius could also mean erotic love, modeled on the classical reading of Achilles and Patroclus. Their relationship is, however, so subtly approached that for some critics its nature is not entirely clear, a possible concession Virgil made to Roman social restrictions on relationships between freeborn males, especially in a military context. But the author does describe Euryalus as Nisus's amorum, a term which, as acknowledged by both modern classicists and ancient commentators (such as Servius), denotes sexual, not brotherly, love.

== Mythology ==
=== Background ===
Nisus and Euryalus are among the refugees who in the aftermath of the Trojan War flee under the leadership of Aeneas, the highest-ranking Trojan to survive. Nisus was the son of Hyrtacus, and was known for his hunting. The family cultivated the huntress-goddess who inhabited Mount Ida. Euryalus, who was younger, has spent his entire life in a state of war and displacement. He was trained as a fighter by his battle-hardened father, Opheltes, of whom he speaks with pride. Opheltes seems to have died at Troy.

After their wanderings around the Mediterranean, the Trojans are fated to land on the shores of Italy. Some members of their party, especially the matres ("mothers"), are settled at Sicily before the Italian war, but the mother of Euryalus refused to be parted from her son and continued on.

=== Characterization ===
Although Nisus and Euryalus are inseparable as a pair in the narrative, each is given a distinct characterization. Nisus is the elder, more experienced man. He is swift and accurate (acerrimus) in the use of projectile weapons, the javelin (iaculum) and arrows.

Euryalus is still young, with the face of a boy (puer) who hasn't started shaving, just old enough to bear arms. He was more beautiful (pulchrior) than any other of Aeneas's men at arms. Euryalus maintains a loving relationship with his mother. He refuses to see her before he leaves on his mission, because he cannot bear her inevitable tears, and yet his first concern amid promises of rich rewards is that she be cared for if he fails to return.

=== Plot and themes ===
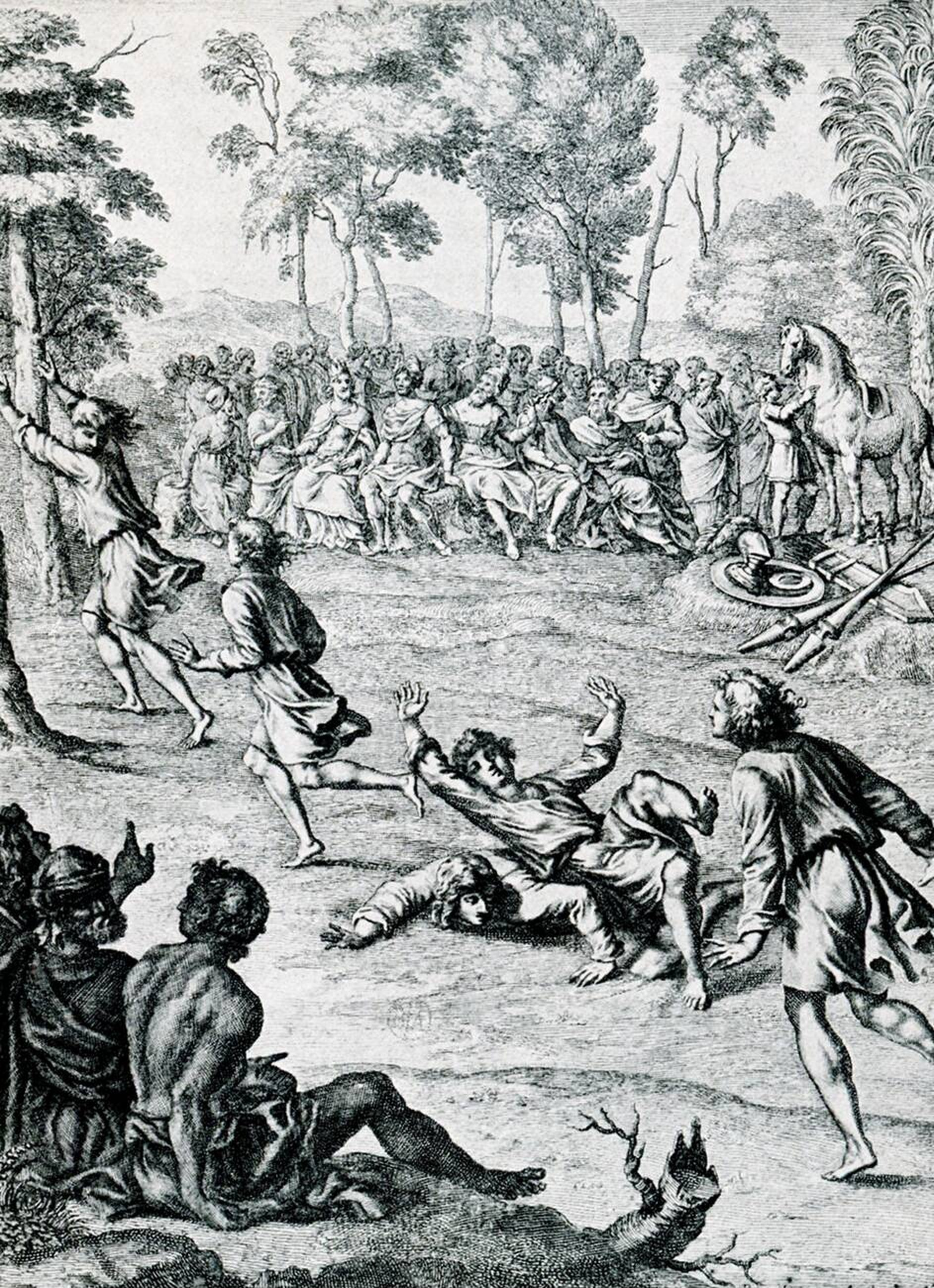
Illustration of the funeral games episode where Nisus fell as he was about to win the foot race, then tripped Salius to ensure that Euryalus would win instead, found in Eva March Tappan's Stories from the Classics, 1907.

The foray by Nisus and Euryalus is a well-developed, self-contained episode that occurs in the "Iliadic" half of the Aeneid, set during the war through which the displaced Trojans established themselves among the inhabitants of central Italy. Virgil introduces the characters anew, but they have already appeared in Book 5, at the funeral games held for Aeneas's father, Anchises, during the "Odyssean" first half of the epic. The games demonstrate behaviors that in the war to come will result in victory or defeat; in particular, the footrace in which Nisus and Euryalus compete prefigures their disastrous mission.

The five runners are- in the order in which they would have finished- Nisus, Salius, Euryalus, Elymus, and Diores. Nisus, however, slips in the blood from the cattle sacrificed during the religious rituals that preceded the race. Recognizing that he can't recover his lead, he trips Salius to hand the victory to Euryalus. Nisus shows himself willing to sacrifice his own honor in order to help Euryalus, but the gesture demonstrates not only his loyalty but a willingness to cheat. Salius objects to the foul, and is given a consolation prize. Nisus receives compensation for his bad luck, and Euryalus gets the winner's prize. The incident is treated as comic, but becomes ominous in light of what happens to the pair later.

Although the night raid of Nisus and Euryalus has a discrete narrative unity, it is closely related to major themes of the epic, such as the transition from boyhood to manhood, also present in the characters of Ascanius, Pallas, and Lausus, and the waste of young lives in war. Nisus and Euryalus's killing spree through the camp of the Rutuli is one of Virgil's most brutal descriptions of combat (especially when Nisus beheads the military leader Remus with his warriors Lamyrus, Lamus and Serranus). The poetry of Euryalus's death – "as when a richly hued flower is cut down by the plough and withers as it dies, or when the rains beat down the poppy's head, weighed down on slack neck" – is a replay of the death of Gorgythion in the Iliad.
