= Iphis (mythology) =

Iphis (Ancient Greek: Ἶφις, romanized: Îphis) was a name attributed to the following individuals in Greek mythology.

The feminine name Iphis (Ἶφις Îphis, gen. Ἴφιδος Ī́phidos) refers to the following personages.

- Iphis, daughter of Ligdus and Telethusa. Iphis was raised male and eventually transformed into a man by the goddess Isis in order to marry Ianthe, daughter of Telestes.
- Iphis, as recounted in Homer's Iliad, was the slave of Patroclus, Achilles' companion-in-arms. A native of Scyros, she had been enslaved by Achilles when the latter conquered her home island, and given by him to Patroclus. Pausanias describes a painting of Iphis, Diomede and Briseis admiring Helen's beauty as the latter has been brought back to the Greek camp from the sacked Troy.
- Iphis, a Thespian princess as one of the 50 daughters of King Thespius and Megamede or by one of his many wives. When Heracles hunted and ultimately slayed the Cithaeronian lion, Iphis with her other sisters, except for one, all laid with the hero in a night, a week or for 50 days as what their father strongly desired it to be. Iphis bore Heracles a son, Celeustanor.
- Iphis, daughter of Peneus, mother of Salmoneus by Aeolus, the son of Hellen.
- Iphis, variant for Iphigenia or Iphianassa.

The masculine name Iphis (Ἶφις Îphis, gen. Ἴφιος Ī́phios) refers to the following personages.

- Iphis, in Ovid's Metamorphoses, was a Cypriot shepherd who loved a woman named Anaxarete. Anaxarete scorned him and Iphis killed himself in despair. Because Anaxarete was still unmoved, Aphrodite changed her to stone. In a different variant they are called Arceophon and Arsinoe.
- Iphis, son of Alector, was one of the kings in Argos. Polynices came to him for advice on how to get Amphiaraus to join the Seven against Thebes. He advised him to give Eriphyle the necklace of Harmonia. He was the father of Eteoclus, Evadne (wife of Capaneus) and Laodice (mother of Capaneus). He left his kingdom to his grandson Sthenelus, the son of his son-in-law Capaneus.
- Iphis or Iphitus, one of the Argonauts, son of Sthenelus and brother of Eurystheus, from Argos. He was killed in battle in Colchis by Aeetes.
- Iphis, one of the defenders of Thebes in the war of the Seven against Thebes. He was killed by Acamas.
- Iphis, father of Ligdus (see above).

Regnal titles
Preceded by Alector	King of Argos	Succeeded by Sthenelus
