= Amphinomus =

Mythological Greek character

In Greek mythology, Amphinomus (/æmˈfɪnəməs/; Ancient Greek: Ἀμφίνομος, romanized: Amphínomos, lit. 'between or around laws') may refer to the following personages:

- Amphinomus, the Aetolian father of Thyrie (Hyria) who became the mother of Cycnus by Apollo.
- Amphinomus, a prince of Dulichium as the son of King Nisos. He was one of the suitors of Penelope and was considered the best-behaved of them. Despite Odysseus's warning, Amphinomus was compelled by Athena to stay, as he had been a suitor nonetheless. He was killed by a spear thrown by Telemachus during the Ithaca massacre; ironically, Amphinomus had twice tried to dissuade the suitors from killing Telemachus.
- Amphinomus, son of Diomedes and the daughter of King Daunus of Apulia in Italy.
- Amphinomus, brother of Anapias (named in latin: Pii Fratres, lit. 'the saint brothers'): they are legendary characters of the Greek Catania (Sicily, Italy), who saved their parents from an eruption of Etna, carrying them on their shoulders.

There was also a Greek geometer called Amphinomus. He is thought to have flourished in the fourth century BC, but is otherwise unknown. He is mentioned a few times by Proclus in his Commentary on the First Book of Euclid's Elements.
