= Nicolas Gédoyn =

French clergyman, translator, educationalist and literary critic

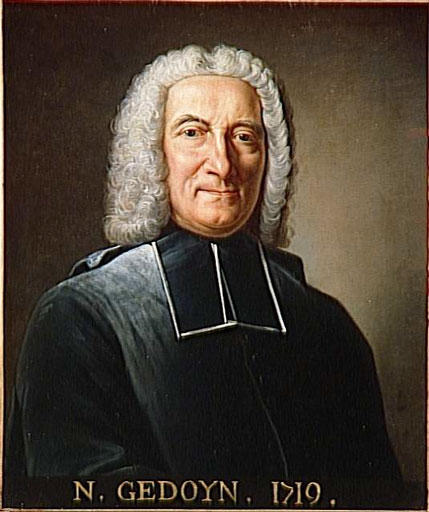

Nicolas Gédoyn (15 June 1677 – 10 August 1744) was a French clergyman, translator, pioneer educationalist and literary critic. He was the fifth member elected to occupy seat 3 of the Académie française in 1719, and the Académie des Inscriptions et Belles-Lettres in 1722

Gédoyn was born in Orléans. Trained by the Jesuits from the age of 15, he was appointed professor of rhetoric in Blois, then canon at the Sainte-Chapelle and Abbey Beaugency. Among his literary works are translations of Quintilian and Pausanias. He died in Beaugency.

== Bibliography ==
- "Nicolas GÉDOYN (1677-1744): Élu en 1719 au fauteuil 3". Académie française. 2009. Archived from the original on 2009-01-30.
