= Leben (Crete) =

Ancient city in Crete

Coordinates: 34°55′57″N 24°55′27″E

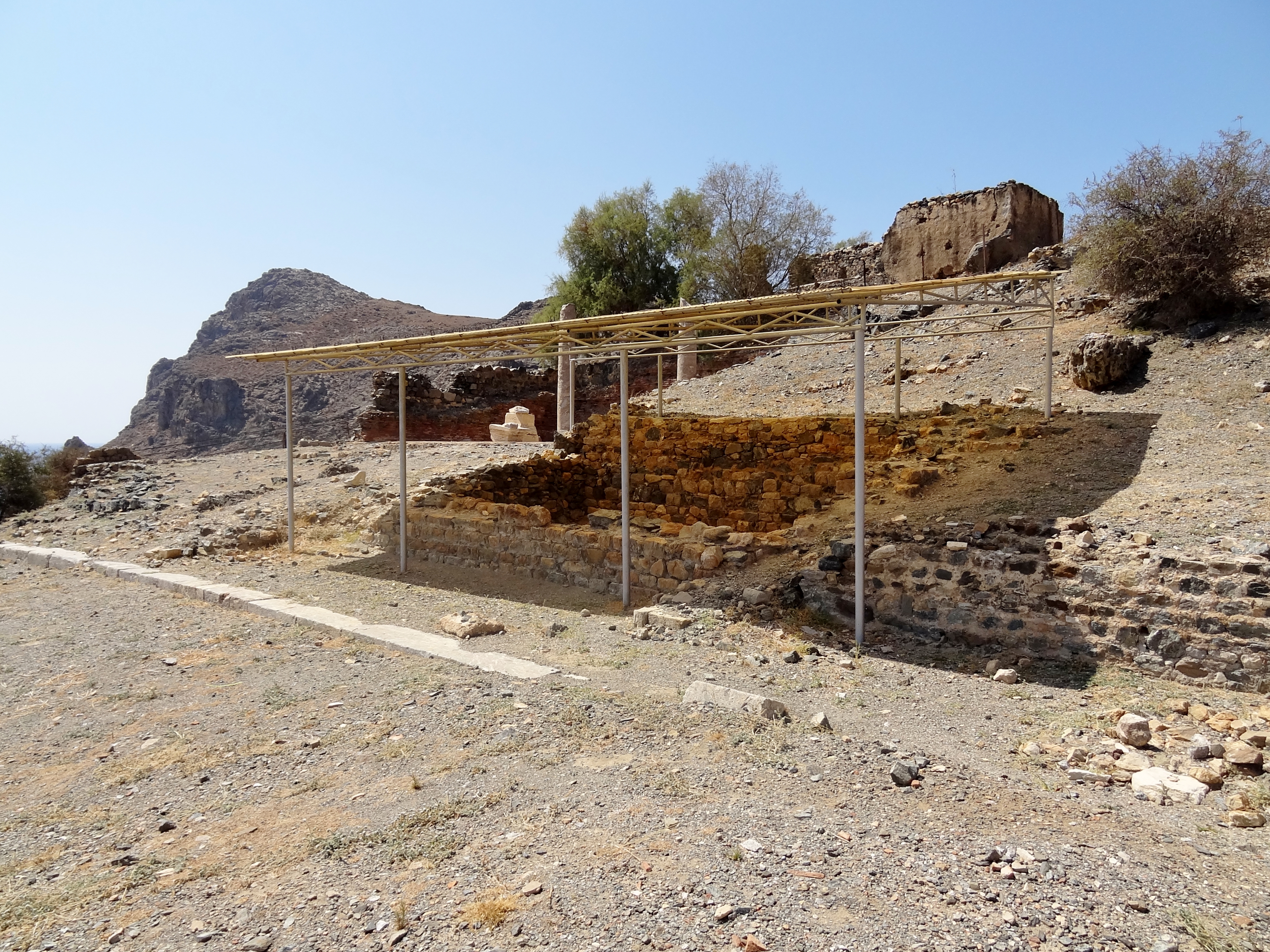
Temple of Asclepius at Leben

Leben (Ancient Greek: Λέβην) or Lebena (Λέβηνα) or Lebene (Λεβήνη) was a maritime town of ancient Crete, a harbour of Gortyna, about 70 stadia inland. It possessed a temple of Asclepius, of great celebrity. In the Peutinger Table its name appears as Ledena. According to the Stadiasmus Maris Magni, it had a harbour and was located 270 stadia from Biannus and 50 stadia from Halas.

The site of Leben is located near modern Lentas.

Leben is the homecity of the mythological heroes Euxynthetus and Leucocomas.

== See also ==
- List of ancient Greek cities
