= Meles (mythology) =

Several people in Greek mythology

In Greek mythology, Meles (Ancient Greek: Μέλης, romanized: Mélēs) can refer to:

- Meles, the river-god of the river Meles in Asia Minor flowing near the ancient city of Smyrna. His parentage is not described in surviving sources, but Hesiod in his Theogony made the Titans Oceanus and Tethys the progenitors of the river-gods. Meles is the legendary father of Homer, the renowned Greek poet, by the nymph Cretheis (or Critheïs). According to the legend Cretheis fell in love with the river, and would drink its water even when not thirsty, take it in her hands, converse with it, and sheds tears of love into the water; the river in turn loved her too and assumed a human form in order to be with her. Alternatively a daughter of Meles married Maeon and had Homer. The goddess Artemis would water her horses in Meles' stream on her way to meet her brother.
- Meles, a handsome Athenian boy who caught the eye of Timagoras. Meles rejected him and challenged Timagoras to jump off of the Acropolis of Athens, and the smitten man did so. When Meles found out that that Timagoras had actually gone through the thoughtless request, he felt remorse and killed himself in the same manner as well. In a different version, his name is Meletus (Ancient Greek: Μέλητος) and his and Timagoras' roles are swapped. The boy had great beauty, but was also cruel and tasked his suitor with hard demands. He requested for hunting hounds from a foreign land, an enemy's well-bred horse, a chlamys owned by someone else and several other things. His last request was for exotic, domestiated birds. Meletus carried out the task, but Timagoras rejected both him and the present. Meletus, hurt by the rejection and fed up with the futility of his efforts, took his own life after leaping from the Acropolis.

== Bibliography ==
- Hesiod, Theogony in Hesiod, the Homeric Hymns and Homerica with an English Translation by Hugh G. Evelyn-White. Homeric Hymns. Cambridge, Massachusetts, Harvard University Press; London, William Heinemann Ltd. 1914. Available on the Internet Archive.
- Homeric Hymns in Hesiod, the Homeric Hymns and Homerica with an English Translation by Hugh G. Evelyn-White. Homeric Hymns. Cambridge, Massachusetts, Harvard University Press; London, William Heinemann Ltd. 1914. Available on the Internet Archive.
- Homerica in Hesiod, the Homeric Hymns and Homerica with an English Translation by Hugh G. Evelyn-White. Homeric Hymns. Cambridge, Massachusetts, Harvard University Press; London, William Heinemann Ltd. 1914. Available on the Internet Archive.
- Pausanias, Description of Greece with an English Translation by W.H.S. Jones, Litt.D., and H.A. Ormerod, M.A., in 4 Volumes. Cambridge, MA, Harvard University Press; London, William Heinemann Ltd. 1918. Online version at the Perseus Digital Library.
- Philostratus the Elder, Imagines, translated by Arthur Fairbanks. Loeb Classical Library 256. Cambridge, MA: Harvard University Press, 1931. Loeb Classical Library.
- Sudas, Suda, translated and edited by several authors, including Jennifer Benedict. Suda on Line.
