= Hyria (mythology) =

Greek mythological woman

In Greek mythology, Hyria (Ancient Greek: Ὑρίη) or Hyrie, also called Thyria or Thyrie (Ancient Greek: Θυρίη, romanized: Thurie) (Note: Antoninus Liberalis spells her name as Thyrie, Ovid as Hyrie.) was the Aetolian daughter of Amphinomus and mother, by Apollo, of Cycnus.

== Mythology ==
Hyrie grieved much for her son's death, not knowing he had been transformed into a swan; so she melted away in tears or, as others say, threw herself into a lake (Hyria) and was herself turned into a swan.

== See also ==
- Aëdon
- Olenus
- Phene (mythology)
