= Nisus (mythology) =

In Greek mythology, Nisus (Ancient Greek: Νῖσος, romanized: Nîsos) may refer to the following personages:

- Nysus (possibly identical to Silenus), foster father of Dionysus.
- Nisus, a king of Megara and father of Scylla.
- Nisus, son of Hyrtacus, and lover and friend of Euryalus, in Virgil's Aeneid. He participated in the games held by Aeneas in Sicily. Nisus later died in battle.
- Nisus, king of Dulichium and son of Aretus. He was the father of Amphinomus, one of the Suitors of Penelope.
