= Anaxarete =

Cypriot woman in Greek mythology

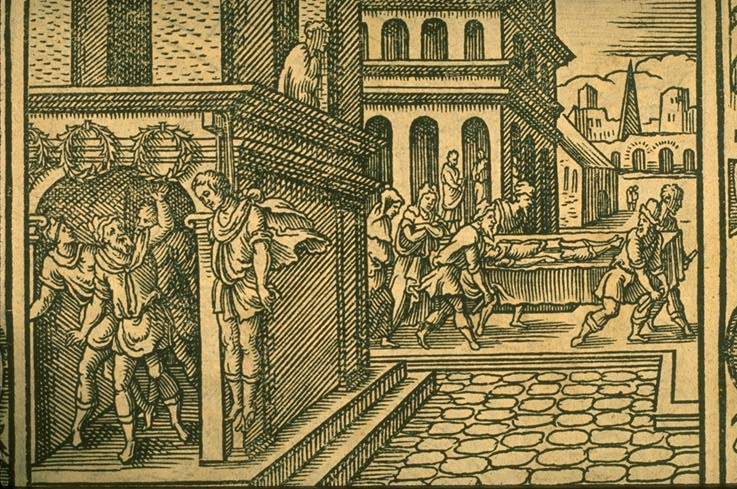
Iphis and Anaxarete illustration by Virgil Solis

In Greek mythology, Anaxarete (Ancient Greek: Ἀναξαρέτη means 'excellent princess') was a princess from Cyprus, who is said to have been descended from Teucer. She attracts the love of a young man named Iphis, who she scornfully rebuffs, pushing him to the point of killing himself upon her doorstep. After his death, she remains unmoved, and Aphrodite transforms her into a stone statue.

== Family ==
Anaxarete is said to have been from Cyprus, and her family to have been descended from Teucer, the legendary founder of the Cypriot city of Salamis. She is said to have been a princess in this genealogical line.

== Mythology ==
In the Metamorphoses, a Latin poem by the Roman poet Ovid from 8 AD, Anaxarete catches the eye of a young man named Iphis. He immediately falls in love with her, and while he attempts to suppress his feelings for some time, he finds himself unable to control his adoration. He arrives at her dwelling, and reveals his feelings to her nurse; he also tries to tempt her servants into aiding him in amorous endeavour, and places flowers, drenched in his own tears, outside the entrance to her house. However, Anaxarete, who is described as "more savage than the waves that rise at the setting of the Kids, harder than steel tempered in Noric fire", is resolutely unfeeling towards him, and rebuffs him with scorn; in doing so, she drains the hope of her would-be lover.

Pushed to a place of mental torment, Iphis delivers distraught and suicidal final words while standing upon her doorstep. He then hangs himself there, but Anaxarete is still unmoved. When she mocks his funeral, calling it pitiful, Aphrodite turned her into a stone statue. According to Ovid, the statue was preserved at Salamis in Cyprus, in the temple of Venus Prospiciens.

== In culture ==
A similar tale is told by Antoninus Liberalis, although he names the maiden Arsinoe, and her admirer Arceophon. Plutarch mentions yet another variation with the Cretans Gorgo and Asander.
