= Arsinoe (daughter of Nicocreon) =

Greek mythological figure

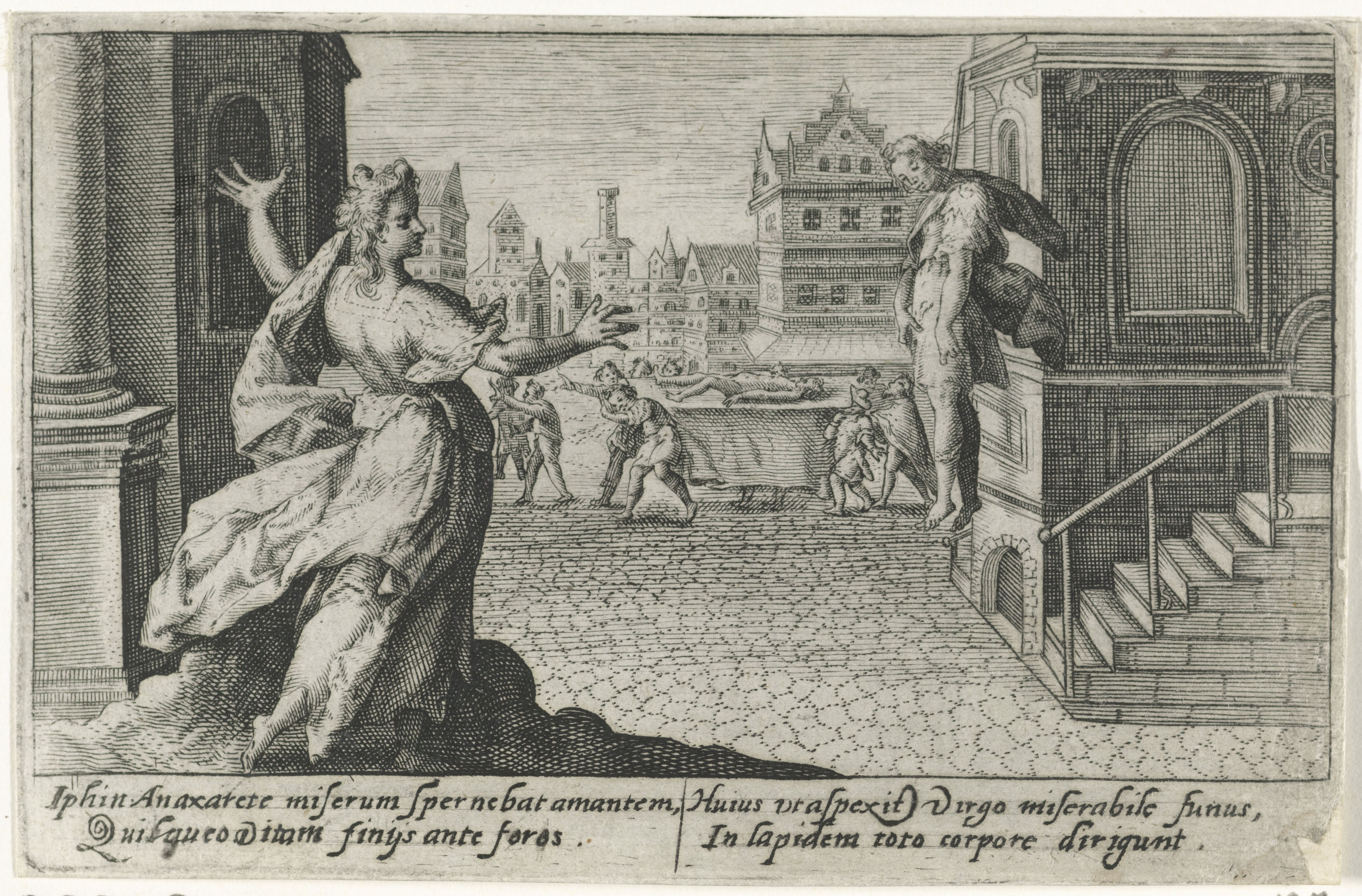
Anaxarete sees the dead Iphis, 1602–7 engraving.

In Greek mythology, Arsinoe (Ancient Greek: Ἀρσινόη, romanized: Arsinóē, lit. 'elevated-minded' pronounced [arsinóɛː]) is a Cypriot princess who was punished by being turned into stone at the hand of the goddess of love Aphrodite for turning down a potential suitor named Arceophon, who then killed himself.

Arsinoe and her brief petrification tale serve as a doublet for the also Cypriot and more well-known story of Iphis and Anaxarete which follows the same pattern. Her tale is only preserved in the writings of Antoninus Liberalis, a little-known author of the Roman imperial era.

== Mythology ==
Princess Arsinoe was the daughter of King Nicocreon of Salamis, which was also known by the name Arsinoe (modern Famagusta), from the island of Cyprus, a descendant of Teucer, by his unnamed wife. A wealthy Phoenician-descended man called Arceophon, son of Minnyrides, fell in love with her and tried to woo her by promising many gifts, but Nicocreon refused to give his daughter's hand in marriage to him due to his ignoble and Phoenician origin. The lovestruck Arceophon would then visit Arsinoe's house at night, even orchestrating a night-serenade with youths of his age, trying to win her heart in vain for she spurned him.

He even tried to bribe Arsinoe's wetnurse so that she would help him get close to the girl. But when the wetnuse delivered the youth's proposition to Arsinoe, she immediately informed her parents and they kicked out the nurse after cutting off her tongue, her nose and her fingers. In great despair over the prospects of marriage to Arsinoe diminishing, Arceophon killed himself via starvation, and was mourned greatly. During his funeral, Arsinoe peeped out of the window to get a glimpse at the pocession, and so Aphrodite, the goddess of love and beauty, turned the girl into stone.

== Culture ==
This story seems to be a variant of the also Cypriot tale of Iphis and Anaxarete, known thanks to its inclusion in Ovid's Metamorphoses. The story is also referenced by Plutarch, who compares it with the little-known tales of Euxynthetus and Leucomantis (which did not feature petrification) and the Cretan Gorgo and Asander (which did).

In standard Greek metamorphosis myths, the inanimate objects humans are transformed into usually reflect some quality or feature of the original person, though stone is typically an exception to this rule; Arsinoe's story however is in fact a rare case of petrification actually indicating the cold-heartedness and cruelty that the human exhibited before undergoing said transformation.

The king in the story, Nicocreon, was a real historical king of Cyprus who lived during the time of Alexander the Great, giving the story a historical setting.

== Legacy ==
In Daphnis et Alcimadure, a seventeenth-century fable by Jean de La Fontaine based on classical mythology and particularly Theocritus' works, the young shepherd Daphnis falls in love with Alcimadure who rejects him. He dies, but Alcimadure sheds no tears and instead continues to insult Eros the god of love, until his statue that she dances around topples and crushes her to death.

== See also ==
Other heroes in Greek mythology who were petrified by the gods:

- Propoetides
- Pyrrhus
- Niobe
- Lethaea

== Bibliography ==
- Antoninus Liberalis, The Metamorphoses of Antoninus Liberalis translated by Francis Celoria (Routledge 1992). Online version at the Topos Text Project.
- Bell, Robert E. (1991). Women of Classical Mythology: A Biographical Dictionary. ABC-Clio. ISBN 9780874365818.
- Celoria, Francis (1992). The Metamorphoses of Antoninus Liberalis: A Translation with Commentary. Routledge. ISBN 9780415068963.
- Forbes Irving, Paul M. C. (1990). Metamorphosis in Greek Myths. Clarendon Press. ISBN 0-19-814730-9.
- Murray, Alexander Stuart; Klapp, William H. (2005). Handbook of World Mythology. Mineola, New York: Dover Publications, Inc. ISBN 0-486-44374-4.
- Plutarch, Moralia, Volume IX: Table-Talk, Books 7-9. Dialogue on Love. Translated by Edwin L. Minar, F. H. Sandbach, W. C. Helmbold. Loeb Classical Library 425. Cambridge, MA: Harvard University Press, 1961.
- Runyon, Randolph (2000). In La Fontaine's Labyrinth: A Thread Through the Fables. Charlottesville, VI: Rookwood Press. ISBN 1-886365-16-4.
- Smith, William (1873). A Dictionary of Greek and Roman Biography and Mythology. London: J. Murray. Online version at perseus.tufts library.
