= Eva March Tappan =

American academic (1854–1930)

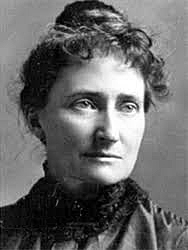
- Born: December 26, 1854; Blackstone, Massachusetts, U.S.
- Died: January 29, 1930 (aged 75)
- Education: Vassar College
- Occupations: Teacher, author

Eva March Tappan (December 26, 1854 – January 29, 1930) was an American teacher and author born in Blackstone, Massachusetts, the only child of Reverend Edmund March Tappan and Lucretia Logée. Eva graduated from Vassar College in 1875. She was a member of Phi Beta Kappa and an editor of the Vassar Miscellany. After leaving Vassar she began teaching at Wheaton College, where she taught Latin and German from 1875 until 1880. From 1884–94 she was the Associate Principal at the Raymond Academy in Camden, New Jersey. She received graduate degrees in English Literature from the University of Pennsylvania. Tappan was the head of the English department at the English High School at Worcester, Massachusetts. She began her literary career writing about famous characters in history and developed an interest in writing children books. Tappan never married.

== Principal works ==
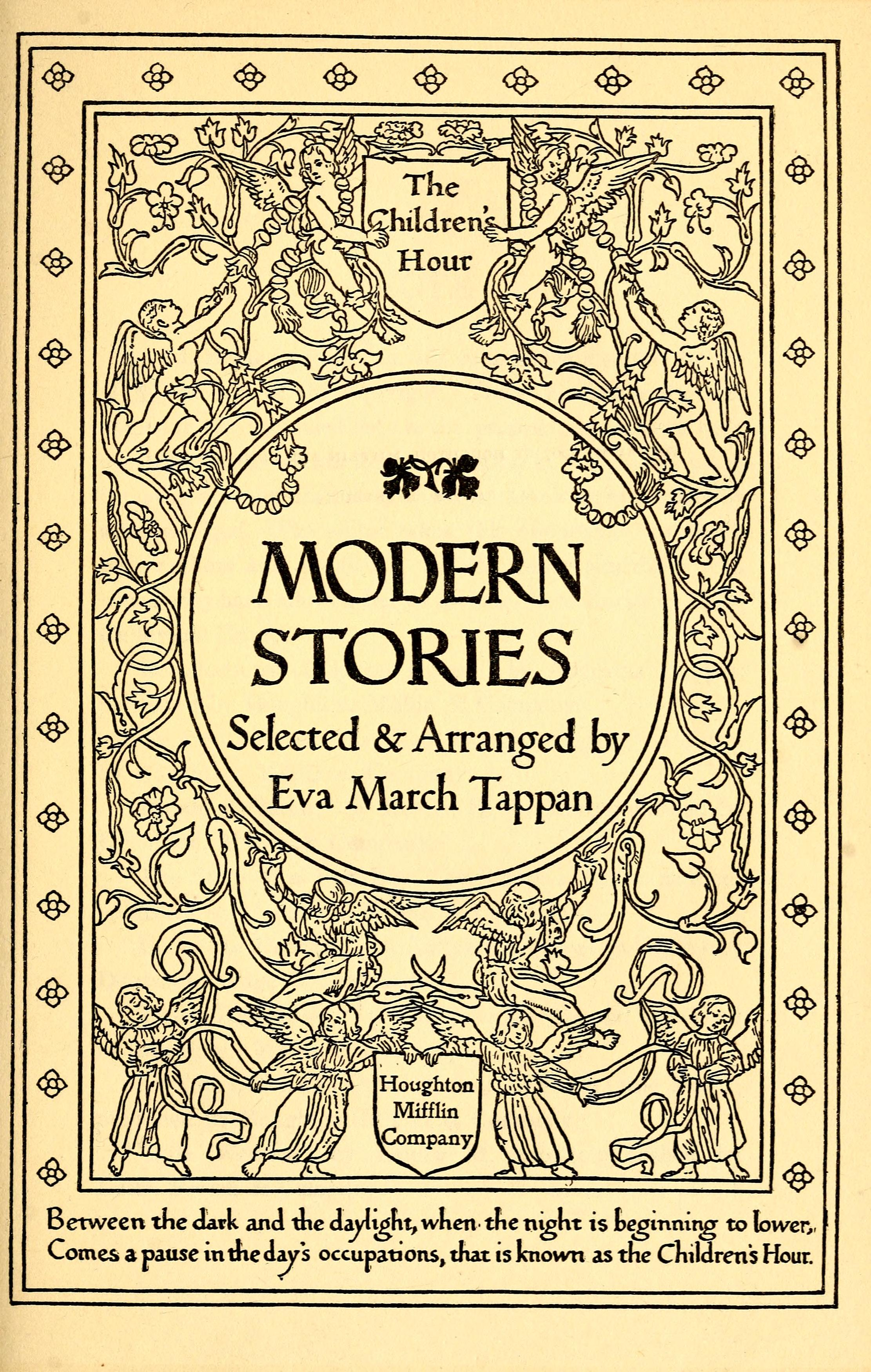
Modern Stories Selected & Arranged by Eva March Tappan (1907)

- Adventures & Achievements. 1900
- Poems & Rhymes. 1900
- In the Days of Alfred the Great. 1900
- Stories from Seven Old Favourites. 1900
- In the Days of William the Conqueror. 1901
- England's story; a history for grammar and high schools. 1901
- In the Days of Queen Elizabeth. 1902
- Robin Hood, : His Book. 1903
- A Short History of England's Literature. 1905
- American Hero Stories. 1906
- A Short History of America's Literature. 1907
- The Out-Of-Door Book. 1907
- The Chaucer Story Book. 1908
- The Story of the Greek People. 1908
- Old World Hero Stories, or European Hero Stories. 1909
- The Story of the Roman People. 1910
- Dixie Kitten. 1910
- An Old, Old Storybook: Compiled from the Old Testament. (Editor) 1910
- When Knights Were Bold. 1911
- An Elementary History of Our Country. 1914
- Heroes of the Middle Ages: Alaric to Columbus. 1914
- The Little Book of the Flag. 1917
- The Little Book of the War. 1918
- Hero Stories of France. 1920
- Heroes of Progress; Stories of Successful Americans. 1921
