= Arceophon =

In Greek mythology, Arceophon (Ancient Greek: Ἀρκεοφῶν, romanized: Arkeophón) was a wealthy man of Salamis in Cyprus, son of Minnyrides (Ancient Greek: Μιννυρίδης, romanized: Minnyrídes), a Phoenician.

== Mythology ==
Arceophon fell in love with Arsinoe, daughter of King Nicocreon (Νικοκρέων, Nikokréon) of Salamis (a descendant of Teucer), and wooed her, but Nicocreon refused to give his daughter to Arceophon because of the latter's Phoenician descent. Arceophon was upset and began to come to Arsinoe's house by night, hoping to win her heart, but in vain. He then tried to bribe Arsinoe's nurse so that she might arrange for them to meet, but Arsinoe reported this to her parents, who cut off the nurse's tongue, nose and fingers and drove her out of their house. Having lost every hope, Arceophon died of suicide by starvation. The fellow citizens grieved at his death and buried him with honors. When Arsinoe leaned out of the window to take a look at the funeral ceremony, Aphrodite turned her into stone.

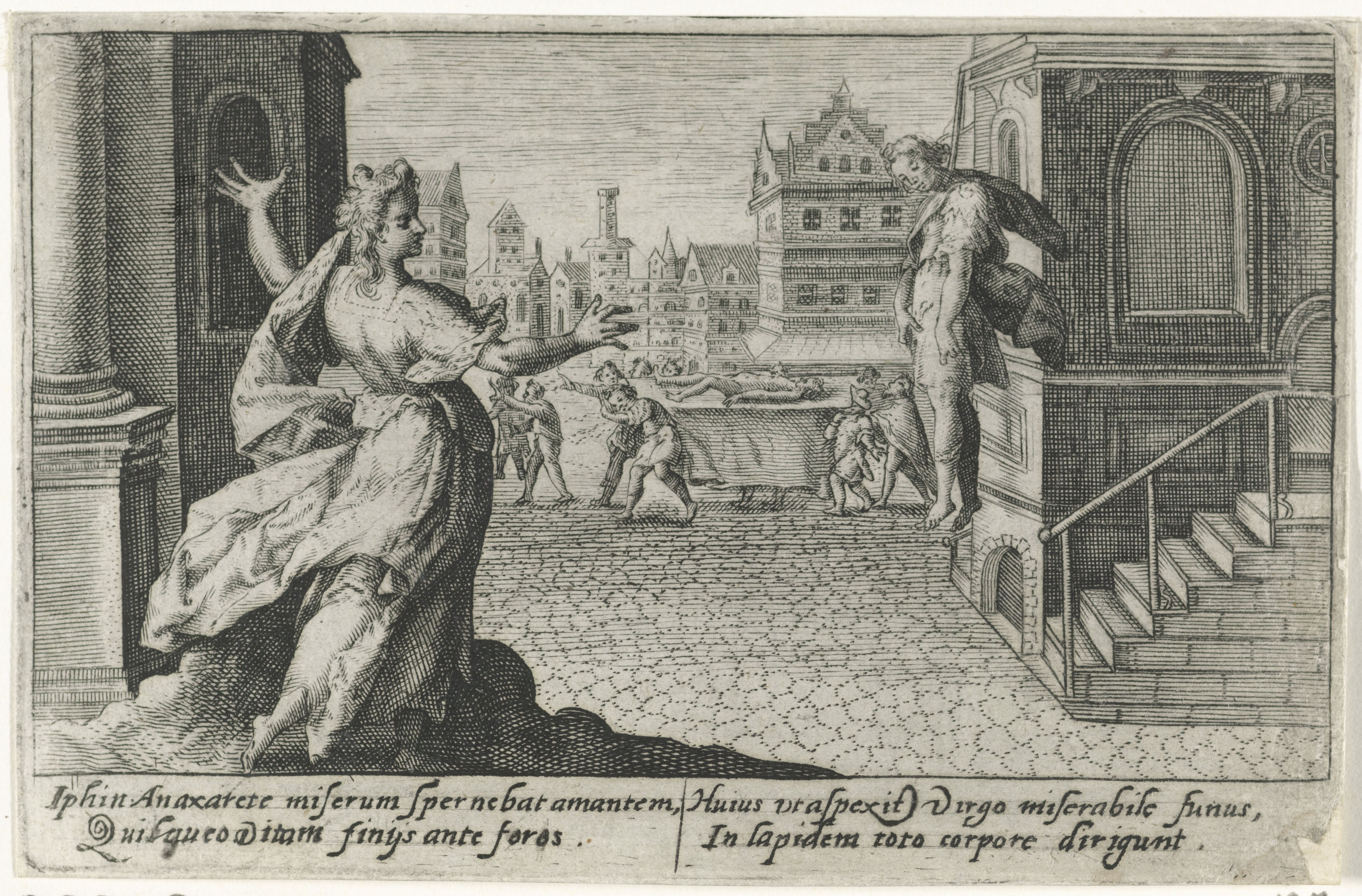
Anaxarete sees the dead Iphis, early 1600s engraving.

The story of Arceophon and Arsinoe is comparable to that of Iphis and Anaxarete.
