= Description of Greece =

Ancient Greek book (2nd c. CE)

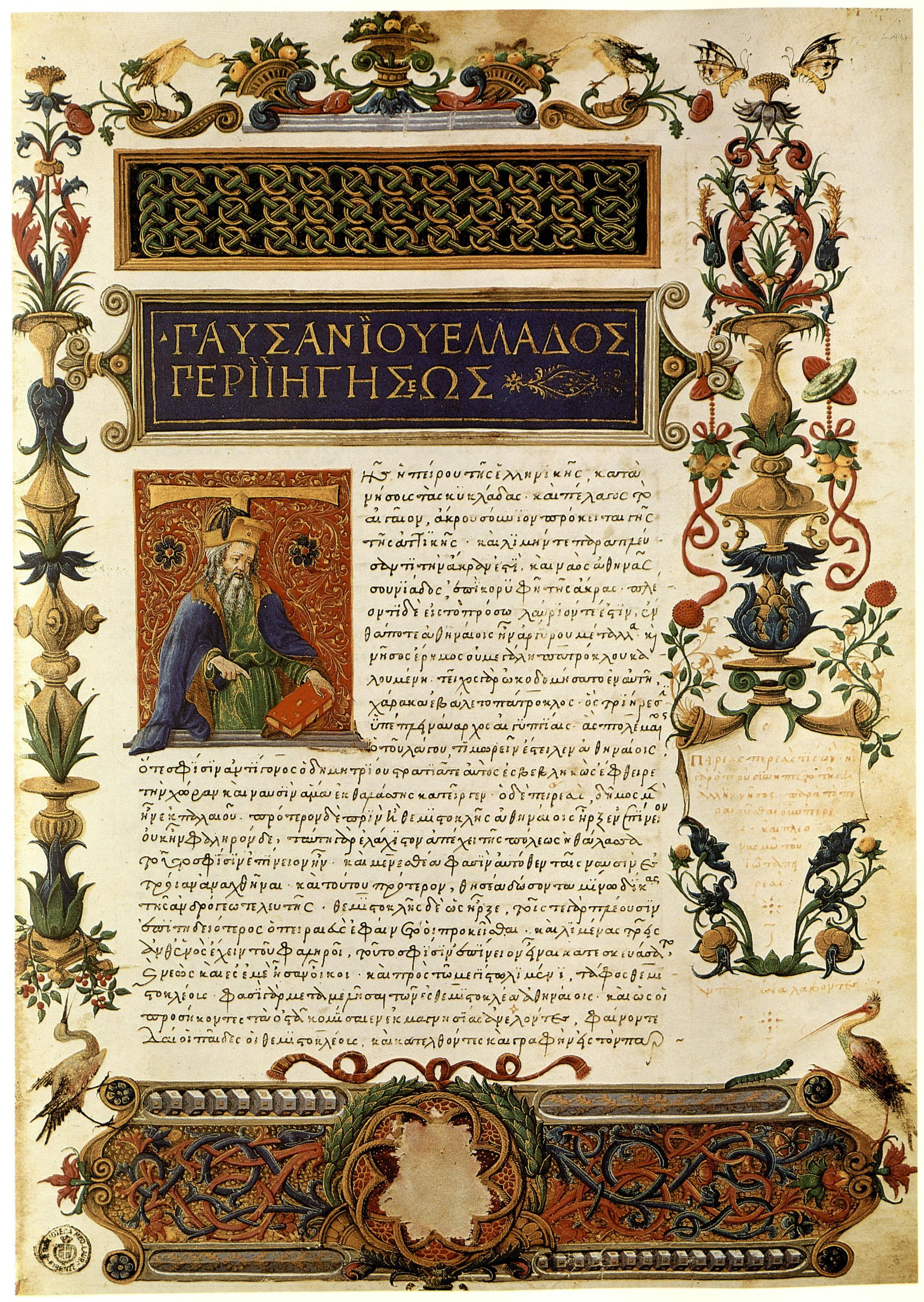
- Illustrated page of a 1485 manuscript of Description of Greece (Laurentian Library collection in Florence)
- Author: Pausanias
- Original title: Ἑλλάδος Περιήγησις
- Language: Greek
- Subject: Geography
- Published: Second century AD
- Publication place: Ancient Greece
- Text: Description of Greece at Wikisource

Description of Greece (Ancient Greek: Ἑλλάδος Περιήγησις, romanized: Helládos Periḗgēsis) is the only surviving work by the ancient geographer Pausanias (c. 110 – c. 180).

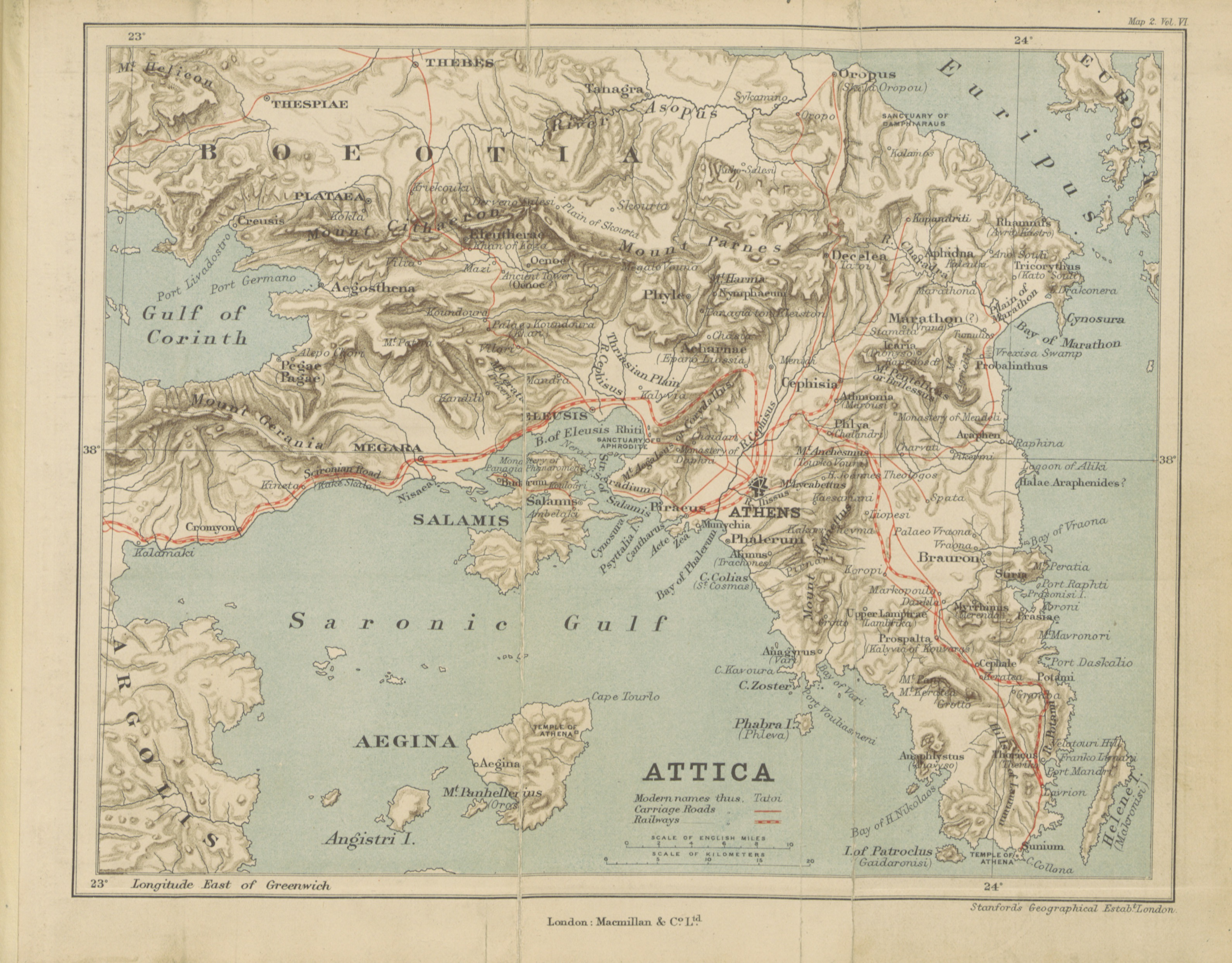
Map from Pausanias's Description of Greece. Translated with a commentary by J. G. Frazer (1898)

The work comprises ten books, each dedicated to some part of mainland Greece. It describes Pausanias' own travels, and large parts of Greece are not covered, including the islands. His tour begins in Attica (Ἀττικά) and continues to Athens, including its suburbs or demes. The work continues to Corinthia (Κορινθιακά), Laconia (Λακωνικά), Messenia (Μεσσηνιακά), Elis (Ἠλιακά), Achaea (Ἀχαϊκά), Arcadia (Ἀρκαδικά), Boeotia (Βοιωτικά), Phocis (Φωκικά), and Ozolian Locris (Λοκρῶν Ὀζόλων).

The work is erratic in its descriptions of topography. Its main interest is the cultural geography of ancient Greece. It focuses especially on religious sites and the historical and mythological underpinnings of the culture that created them. 20th-century archaeological research has confirmed various of his descriptions and increased his credibility as a witness among scholars. In the 19th century his accounts were often regarded as unreliable.

This book is the only surviving contemporary source about Pausanias. There are no ancient mentions of either the work or its author until the 6th century AD, and the book seems to have survived to the Middle Ages in a single manuscript, itself now lost. However, it attracted great interest in the Renaissance and was copied in manuscript several times before being first printed in 1516.

== Description ==
Pausanias was motivated by his interest in religion, mythology, and the local legends around religious sites. His work has been regarded as some kind of "journey into identity," referring to that of the Greek beliefs and heritage. Pausanias describes the religious art and sacred architecture of many famous sites such as Olympia and Delphi. Although as a critic of art and architecture he is usually vague and brief, his few words are often the only surviving literary source from antiquity, and of great interest to historians and archaeologists.

Pausanias was mostly interested in relics of antiquity, rather than contemporary architecture or sacred spaces. For example, in Thebes, he describes the ruins of the house of the poet Pindar, the shields of warriors who died at the famous Battle of Leuctra, and statues of Arion, Hesiod, Orpheus, and Thamyris. He also visited the grove of the Muses on Helicon and saw the portraits of Polybius and of Corinna at Tanagra in Arcadia. As Christian Habicht, a modern day classicist, says: "He definitely prefers the sacred to the profane and the old to the new, and there is much more about classical art of Greece than the about contemporary, more about gods, altars, and temples, than about statues of politicians or public buildings."

Although he was no naturalist, he often gives brief comments on the physical aspects of the ancient landscapes he passed through. Pausanias wrote about the pine trees located on the coast of Ancient Elis, the wild boars and the deer in the oak woods of Seliana (Phelloe), and the crows amid the oak trees in Alalcomenae. Towards the end of Description of Greece, Pausanias touches on the fruits of nature and products, such as the date palms of ancient Aulis, the wild strawberries at Mount Helicon, the olive oil in Tithorea, as well as the "white blackbirds" of Mount Kyllini (Cyllene) and the tortoises of Arcadia.

Pausanias includes multiple passages referring to the Jews, whom he generally designates as "Hebrews." In one instance (1.5.5), he mentions the revolt of the "Hebrews beyond Syria" against Emperor Hadrian. In another passage (8.16.5), he describes the tomb of Helena in Jerusalem, which he notes was a city in the "land of the Hebrews" that had been entirely razed by the Roman Emperor. However, Pausanias mistakenly identifies Helena as a local woman; in reality, she was a royalty from Adiabene, a kingdom in northern Mesopotamia, who had converted to Judaism.

Pausanias ends the Description of Greece with a story about a Greek author, thought to be Anyte of Tegea, who has a divine dream. In the dream, she is told to present the text of Description of Greece to a wider Greek audience in order to open their eyes to "all things Greek." Scholars debate why he concluded the work with this story: some believe that Pausanias died before continuing his travelogue, others that this ending was intentional.

== Reception ==
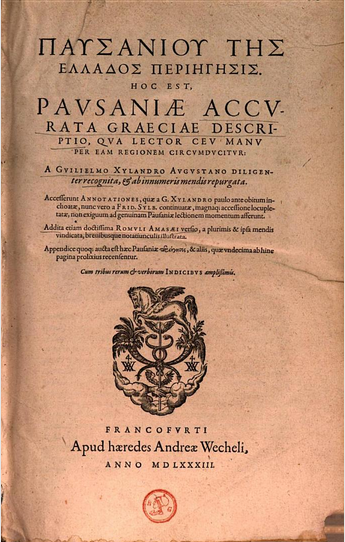
Title page of the Amaseo edition, Frankfurt, 1583.

Description of Greece left only faint traces in the known Greek corpus. "It was not read," Habicht relates, "there is not a single quotation from it, not even a single mention of the author, not a whisper before the sixth century (Stephanus Byzantius), and only three or two references to it throughout the Middle Ages." Eighteen surviving manuscripts of Pausanias were known in the 1830s, copies from the fifteenth or sixteenth century, with three perhaps older than the rest. They are full of lacunae and errors, and all appear to depend on a single manuscript, now missing, that managed to be copied. Niccolò Niccoli, a collector of manuscripts from antiquity, had this archetype in Florence around 1418, brought into Italy from Greece by the bibliophile and traveller Cristoforo de' Buondelmonti. After his death in 1437, it was sent to the library of San Marco, Florence, ultimately disappearing after 1500.

=== Publication ===
The first printed edition (editio princeps) was printed in 1516 in Venice, by the Aldine Press. It was edited by Marcus Musurus (Greek: Μάρκος Μουσοῦρος Markos Mousouros; Italian: Marco Musuro; c. 1470 – 1517) who had already edited many classic Greek authors.

==== Translations ====
It was translated into Latin by Romolo Amaseo and printed in Rome in 1547, with a combined Greek and Latin edition from Thomas Fritsch of Leipzig in 1696. An Italian translation followed in 1593 (Mantua by Alfonso Bonacciuoli). A French translation by Nicolas Gédoyn was published in 1731. It was translated into Latin again in 1896 by German translators Hermann Hitzig and Hugo Blümner.

==== English translations ====
Translations into English begin rather late, with Thomas Taylor (London, 1794). A widely known version of the text was translated by William Henry Samuel Jones and is available through the Loeb Classical Library. The translation as Guide to Greece by Peter Levi is popular among English speakers, but is often thought to be a loose translation of the original text: Levi took liberties with his translation that restructured Description of Greece to function like a general guidebook to mainland Greece. Sir James George Frazer also published six volumes of translation and commentary of Description of Greece; his translation remains a credible work of scholarship to readers of Pausanias today.

== See also ==
- Ptolemy's Geography
- Strabo's Geography
