= Pausanias (geographer) =

2nd-century AD Greek geographer

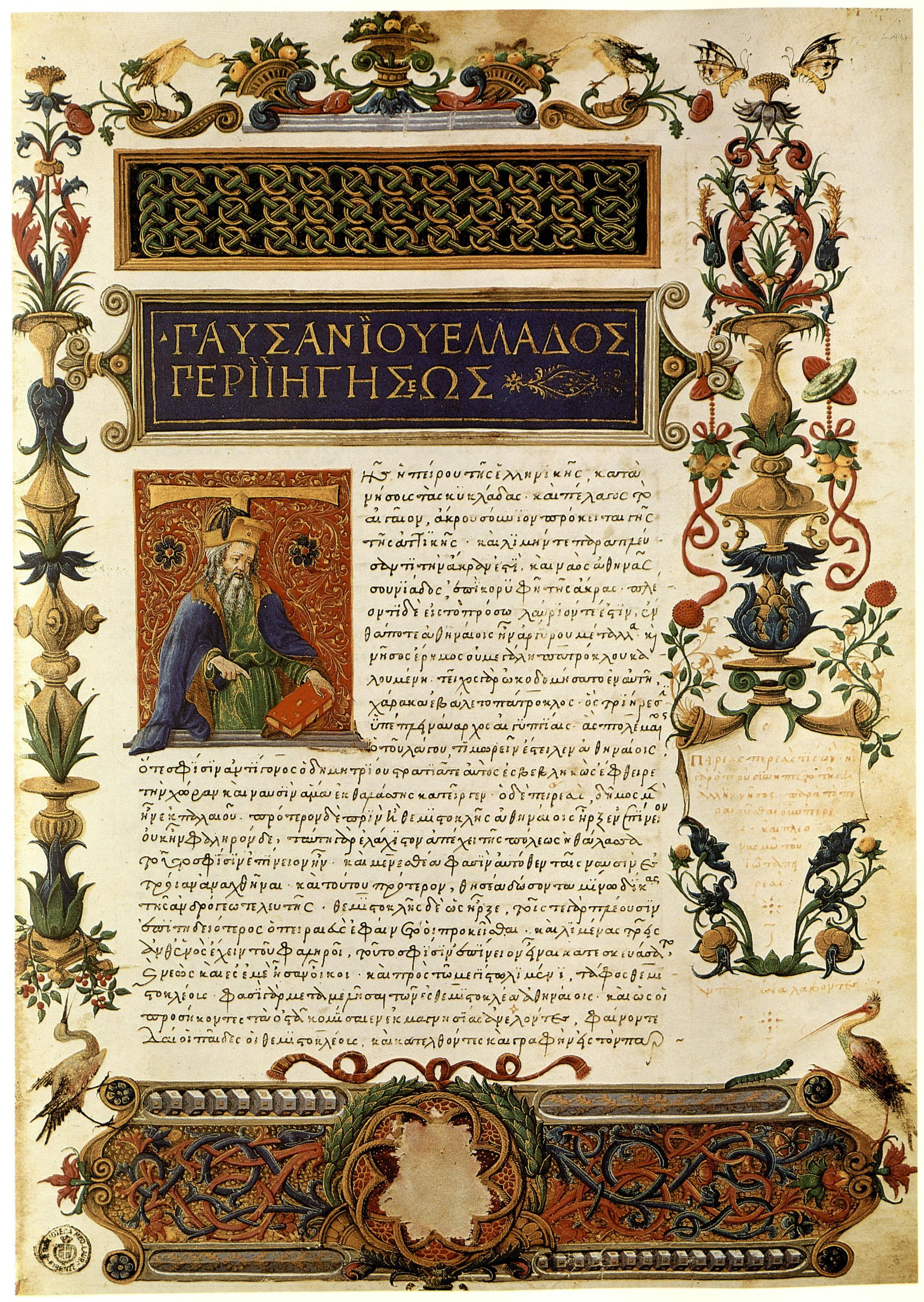
- Illustrated page of a 1485 manuscript of Description of Greece by Pausanias (Laurentian Library collection in Florence)
- Born: c. 110 AD; Lydia, Asia Minor (modern-day Turkey)
- Died: c. 180 AD (aged about 70)
- Occupations: Traveler and geographer

Pausanias (/pɔːˈseɪniəs/ paw-SAY-nee-əs; Ancient Greek: Παυσανίας; c. 110 – c. 180) was a Greek traveler and geographer. He is famous for his Description of Greece (Ἑλλάδος Περιήγησις, Helládos Periḗgēsis), a lengthy work that describes ancient Greece from his firsthand observations. Description of Greece provides crucial information for making links between classical literature and modern archaeology, which is providing evidence of the sites and cultural details he mentions although knowledge of their existence may have become lost or relegated to myth or legend.

== Biography ==
Nothing is known about Pausanias apart from what historians can piece together from his own writing. However, it is probable that he was born c. 110 AD into a Greek family and was probably a native of Lydia in Asia Minor. From c. 150 until his death around 180, Pausanias travelled throughout the mainland of Greece, writing about various monuments, sacred spaces, and significant geographical sites along the way. In writing his Description of Greece, Pausanias sought to put together a lasting written account of "all things Greek", or panta ta hellenika.

=== Living in the Roman Empire ===
Being born in Asia Minor, Pausanias was of Greek heritage. He grew up and lived under the rule of the Roman Empire, but valued his Greek identity, history, and culture. He was keen to describe the glories of a Greek past that was still relevant in his lifetime, even if the country was beholden to Rome as a dominating imperial force. Pausanias's pilgrimage throughout the land of his ancestors was his own attempt to establish a place in the world for this new Roman Greece, connecting myths and stories of ancient culture to those of his own time.

== Writing style ==
Pausanias has a straightforward and simple writing style. He is, overall, direct in his language, writing his stories and descriptions unelaborately. However, some translators have noted that Pausanias's use of various prepositions and tenses may be confusing and difficult to render in English. For example, Pausanias may use a past tense verb rather than the present tense in some instances. Their interpretation is that he did this in order to make it seem as if he were in the same temporal setting as his audience.

Unlike a modern day travel guide, in Description of Greece Pausanias tends to elaborate with discussion of an ancient ritual or to impart a myth related to the site he is visiting. His style of writing would not become popular again until the early nineteenth century when contemporary travel guides resembled his. In the topographical aspect of his work, Pausanias makes many natural history digressions on the wonders of nature documented at the time, the signs that herald the approach of an earthquake, the phenomena of the tides, the ice-bound seas of the north, and that at the summer solstice the noonday sun casts no shadow at Syene (Aswan).

While he never doubts the existence of the deities and heroes, he criticizes some of the myths and legends he encountered during his travels as differing from earlier cultural traditions that he relates or notes. His descriptions of monuments of art are plain and unadorned, bearing a solid impression of reality.

Pausanias is frank in acknowledging personal limitations. When he quotes information at second hand rather than relating his own experiences, he is honest about his sourcing, sometimes confirming contemporary knowledge by him that may be lost to modern researchers.

== Modern reception ==
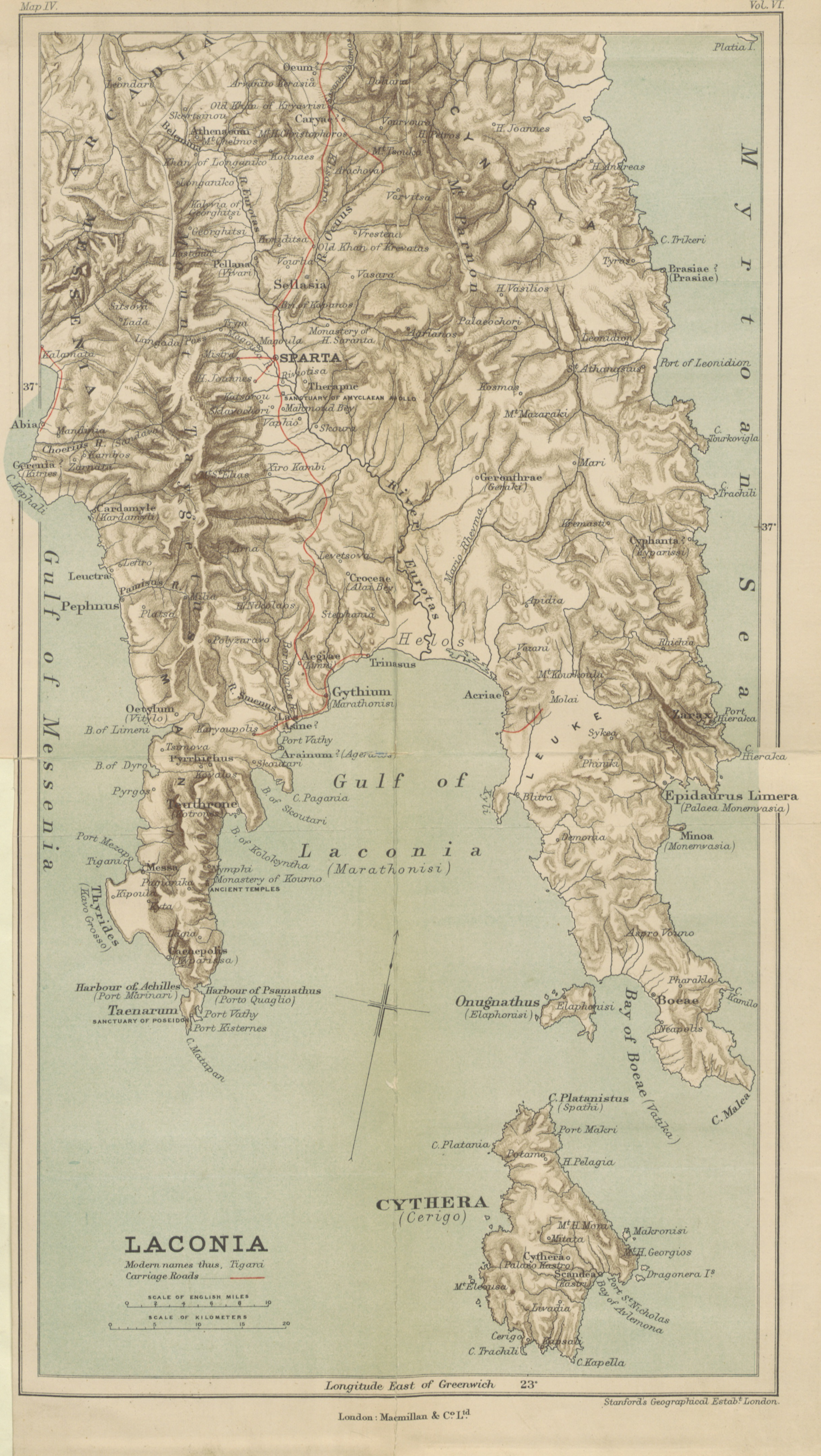
Map of ancient Laconia from Pausanias's Description of Greece translated by James George Frazer, 1898. British Library.

Until twentieth-century archaeologists concluded that Pausanias was a reliable guide to sites being excavated, classicists largely had dismissed his writings as purely literary. Following their presumed authoritative contemporary Ulrich von Wilamowitz-Moellendorff, classicists tended to regard him as little more than a purveyor of second-hand accounts and believed that he had not visited most of the places that he described. Modern archaeological research, however, has revealed the accuracy of information imparted by Pausanias, and even its potential as a guide for further investigations. Research into Tartessos exemplifies where his writing about it is aiding contemporary archaeological research into its existence, location, and culture.

== Bibliography ==
- Howard, Michael C. (2012). Transnationalism in Ancient and Medieval Societies: The Role of Cross-Border Trade and Travel. McFarland. p. 178.
- Hutton, William. Describing Greece: Landscape and Literature in the Periegesis of Pausanias. Cambridge, MA: Cambridge University Press, 2008.
- Pausanias (1918). Description of Greece. Vol. 1. Harvard University Press. ISBN 978-0-434-99093-1.
