= Decoration for a Thesis in Honor of Saint Francis Solano =

Print by Stefano della Bella

Decoration for a Thesis in Honor of St. Francis Solano
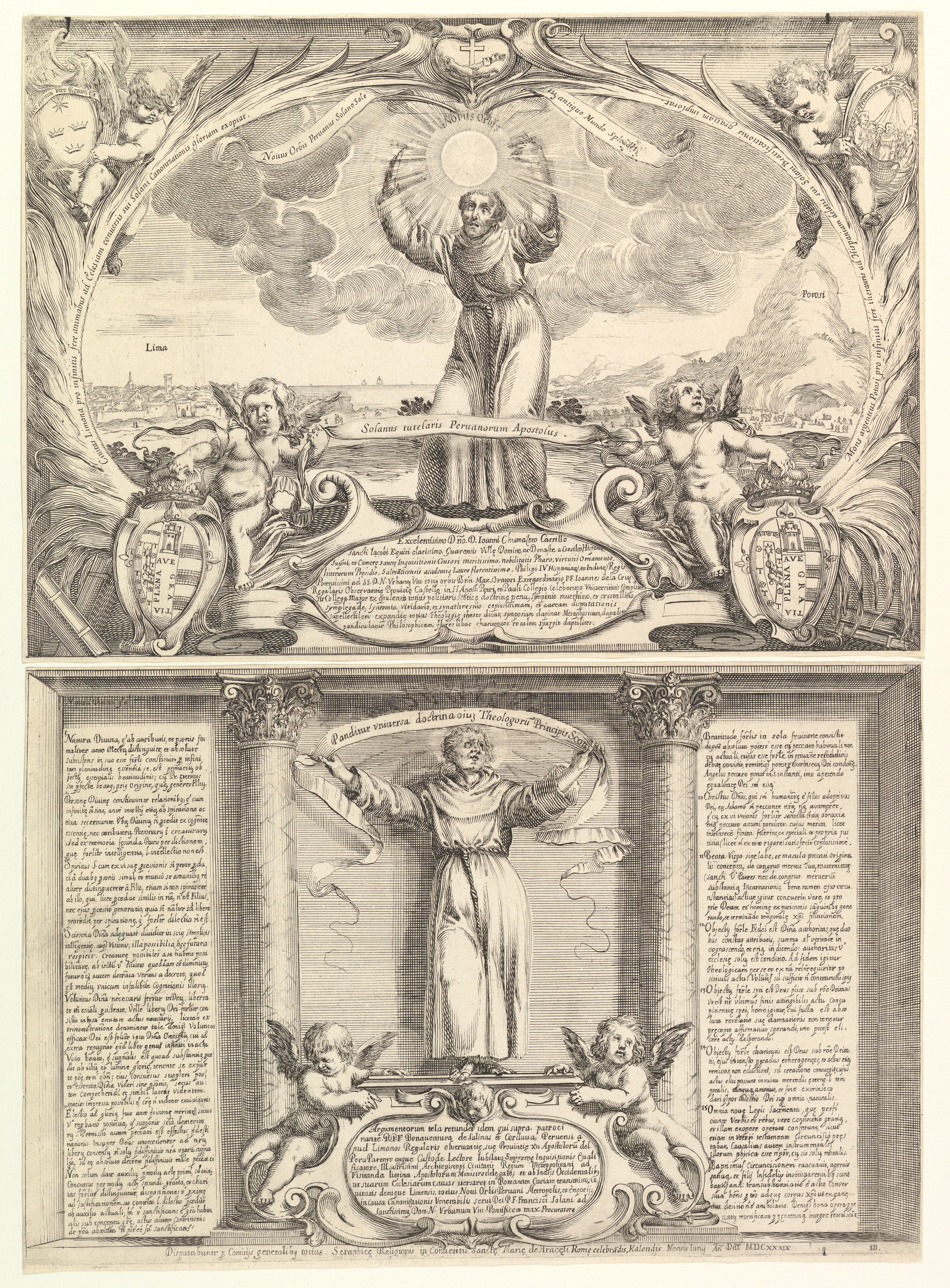
- Artist: Stefano della Bella
- Year: 1639
- Medium: Etching
- Dimensions: Top: 26.5 cm × 37.1 cm (10.4 in × 14.6 in); Bottom: 24.7 cm × 36.9 cm (9.7 in × 14.5 in)

Decoration for a Thesis in Honor of Saint Francis Solano is an etched print in two sheets by the Italian printmaker Stefano della Bella, made in 1639 as an invitation or advertisement for a debate defending a theological thesis. The event took place in the Franciscan convent of Santa Maria in Aracoeli in Rome and was related to the writings of Friar Buenaventura de Salinas y Córdoba. The thesis was dedicated to the Spanish Franciscan friar, Saint Francis Solano for his works with the indigenous communities in the Peruvian Viceroyalty of Spain.

== Visual description ==
=== Top sheet ===
Standing in the middle of the piece is Saint Francis Solano dressed in traditional Franciscan garb, his arms encircling a rising sun. Above the sun appears an emblem displaying a cross overlaid by two crossed arms. He is surrounded by an ovular frame made of leaves, also encompassing within a background featuring two major landmarks in colonial Peru, the capital city of Lima and the Silver mines of Potosí, as well as the Pacific Ocean directly behind Solano. Both within the frame and around it lay several inscriptions written in Latin as well as four putti. Two putti sit at either side of Solano holding an inscription regarding Solano across his knees, while the others look down upon the scene from outside the frame each from one of the top corners. Each of the putti are holding individual coats of arms. Those near the feet of Solano are identical copies portraying medieval imagery and short Latin inscriptions. Those of the upper putti are distinct. The upper left is adorned with three crowns underneath a star with an inscription stating, ¨this is the sign of kings¨. The upper right depicts a friar surrounded by a crowd of men, heads adorned with halos, and an inscription stating, ¨pronounce twelve disciples from Peru¨. The space in the bottom corners is filled on both sides with bound books.

==== Latin inscriptions ====
Ovular frame:

- Left: "The city of Lima for almost unlimited souls converted to the ecclesiastical glory of the Canonization of Solano"
- Right: "The silver Mount Potosi, after conveying to Spain almost unlimited treasures, begs for the favor of the Beatification of Solano"

Center banner:

- "Solano, the guardian angel of the Peruvians"

=== Bottom sheet ===
In the center of the piece stands 13th century Scottish theologian Friar John Duns Scotus dressed in the same fashion as Solano. Scotus is holding a Latin inscribed banner that flows down past his arms. He is flanked by two putti in the same manner as Solano in the work's top sheet. He stands above a Latin inscription and between two stone columns. The columns in the print show similarity to those in the Sevelli Chapel altar in the right transept of the cathedral. The emblem above the sun in the upper sheet also appears as an element in the altar. Directly to the outside of the columns are two sections of Latin inscriptions. The inscriptions on the side are the sixteen theses that were defended at Santa Maria in Aracoeli.

==== Latin inscriptions ====
Center banner:

- "The whole doctrine is spread out by the egg of the prince of Scots theologians"

Bottom margin:

- "General treatises of the whole Seraphic religion will be discussed at the convent of Santa Maria of Aracoeli in Rome, celebrated on the first of June 1639"

== Historical background ==
=== Steffano della Bella ===
In 1610 Steffano della Bella was born to a Florentine sculptor father, whose early death led to Steffano becoming an apprentice in the arts himself. His career took him through various methods, ultimately landing on the practice of etching. He learned the practice from Remigio Cantagallina, former master of Callot, an important figure in Baroque era printmaking. Steffano produced around one thousand etchings throughout his career, focusing greatly on reproducing events going on in the world around him. In 1633 he would move to Rome, where he would eventually complete the titular piece of the article.

=== St. Francis Solano ===
The honoree of the thesis defense at Santa Maria in Aracoeli was a member of the Franciscan Order and a subset of the organization sent on mission to the Viceroyalty of Peru during the times of the colonial Spanish Empire. Franciscans in Peru were both utilized by the Spanish Crown as well as the Catholic church. The crown sought to seek cooperation with the indigenous populations of the region through religious connection, while the church viewed it as an opportunity to evangelize the people of the new world. St. Francis himself was particularly successful in the attempt to grow close with the indigenous peoples. His ability to communicate in various native dialects allowed him to form significant connections within the communities in which he served. It was for this reason that the thesis described in etching was dedicated to him personally.

=== Buenaventura de Salinas y Córdoba ===
Buenaventura was born of mixed Spanish and Peruvian heritage in 1610, in Lima, Peru. Nephew of former Spanish conquistadors, he attended Spanish academic institutions due to the connections of his family, being named the Secretary of the Interior to the Viceroyalty of Peru. However, in 1616 he abandoned his governmental position in favor of the same Franciscan Order as Solano. Compelled by his mixed heritage, he felt the need to protect the indigenous populations from the intentions of the Spaniards via his newfound position as a friar. Buenaventura took up an academic position within the order, authoring several works regarding the work done in the New World. Most notably, "Memorial de las historias del Nuevo Mundo, Perú", chronicling the efforts of the Franciscan Order in Peru, and arguing for the Canonization of Friar Francis Solano. This work prefaced the 1639 thesis defense in Rome.

== Bibliography ==
- "Decoration for a Thesis in Honor of Saint Francis Solano". www.metmuseum.org.
- Massar, Phyllis D. (1968). "Presenting Stefano della Bella". The Metropolitan Museum of Art Bulletin. 27 (3): 159–176. doi:10.2307/3258383. ISSN 0026-1521.
- "Buenaventura de Salinas y Córdoba | Real Academia de la Historia". dbe.rah.es.
- Tibesar, Antonine (1953). Franciscan beginnings in colonial Peru. Publications of the Academy of American Franciscan History. Monograph series, v. 1. Washington: Academy of American Franciscan History.
- "Basilica Santa Maria in Ara Coeli - MONNOROMA.it". www.monnoroma.it.
- Donovan, Stephen (1909). "St. Francis Solanus" . Catholic Encyclopedia. Vol. 6.
