= Cyparissus =

Mythological youth beloved by Apollo or other deities

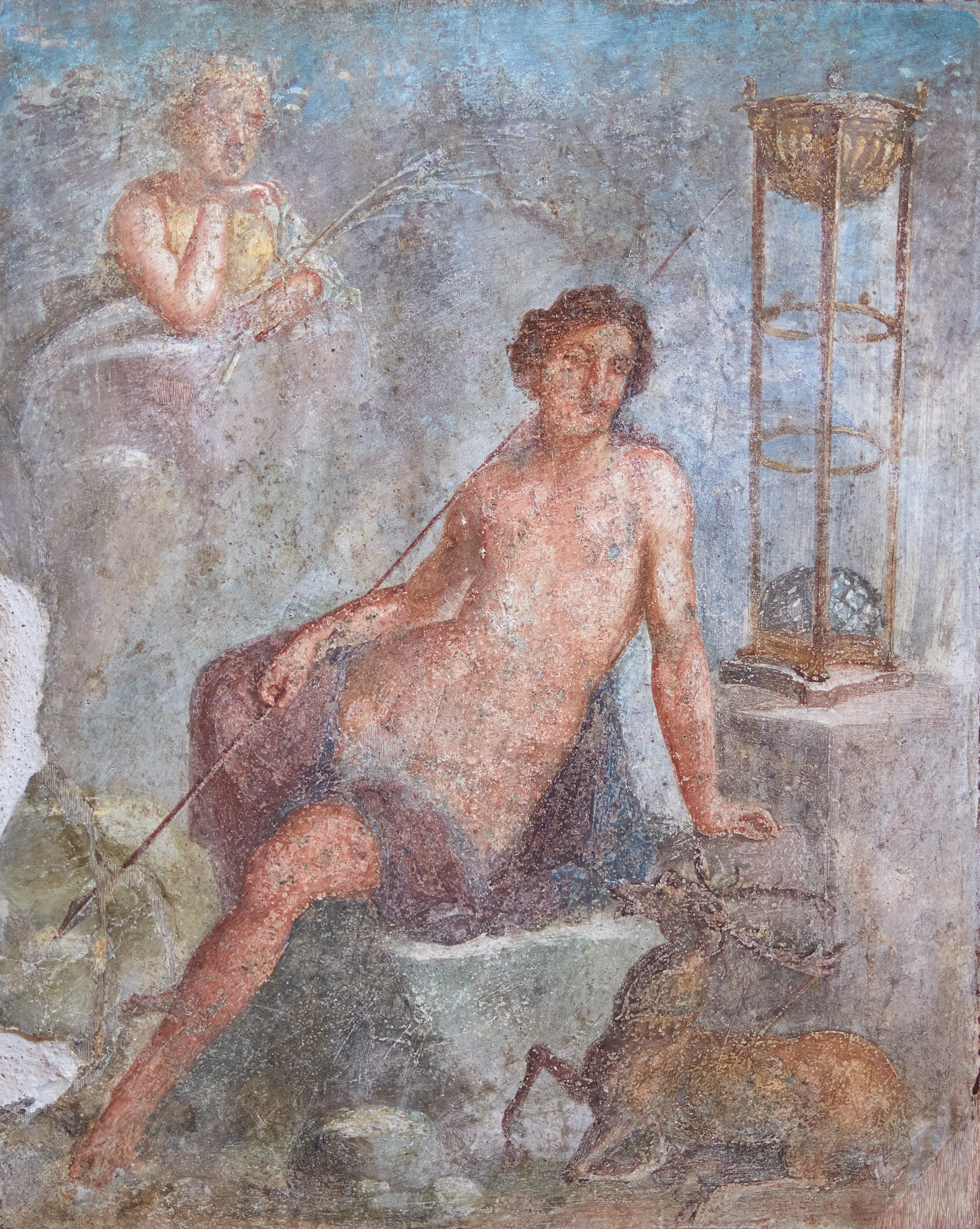
The transformation of Cyparissus, fresco in Pompeii, 1st century.

In ancient Greek and Roman mythology, Cyparissus (Ancient Greek: Κυπάρισσος, romanized: Kupárissos, lit. 'cypress') was a boy beloved by Apollo, or, in some versions, by other deities. In the best-known version of the story, the favorite companion of Cyparissus was a tamed stag, which he accidentally killed with his hunting javelin as it lay sleeping in the woods. The boy's grief was such that it transformed him into a cypress tree, a classical symbol of mourning.

The myth is thus an aetiological tale explaining the relation of the tree to its ancient cultural significance. The subject is mainly known from Greek-inspired Latin literature and frescoes from Pompeii. No Greek hero cult devoted to Cyparissus has been identified.

== Family ==
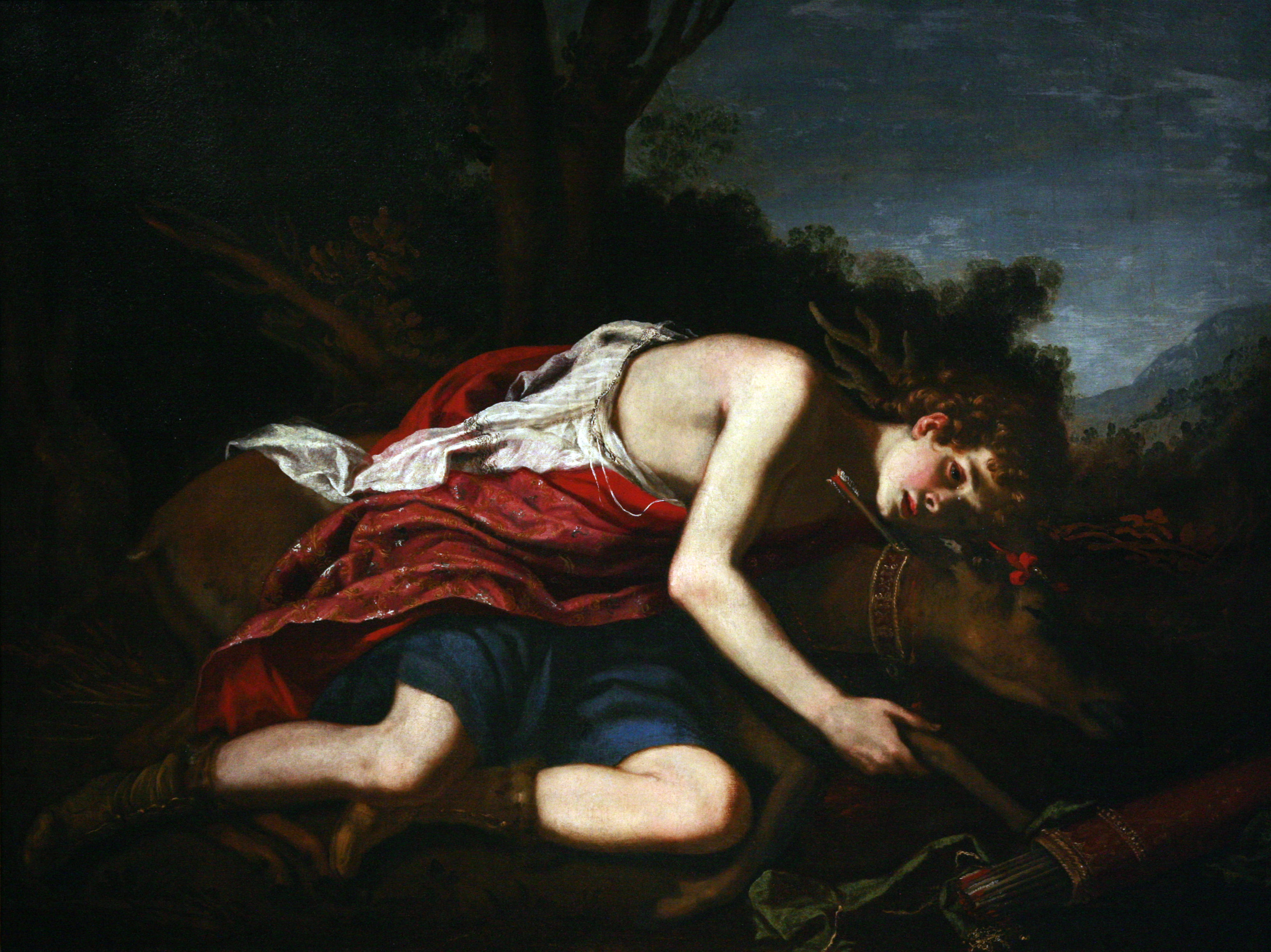
Cyparissus (c. 1625) by Jacopo Vignali: the boy mourns his pet deer (Musée des Beaux-Arts de Strasbourg).

According to the late antiquity grammarian Servius (4th and 5th centuries AD), Cyparissus was the son of Telephus, and thus the grandson of the hero Heracles.

According to a different tradition, a Cyparissus, though possibly not the same figure, was the son of Minyas, and the mythical founder of the town Cyparissus (Kyparissos) in Phocis, which later was called Anticyra.

== Mythology ==
=== Ovid's version ===
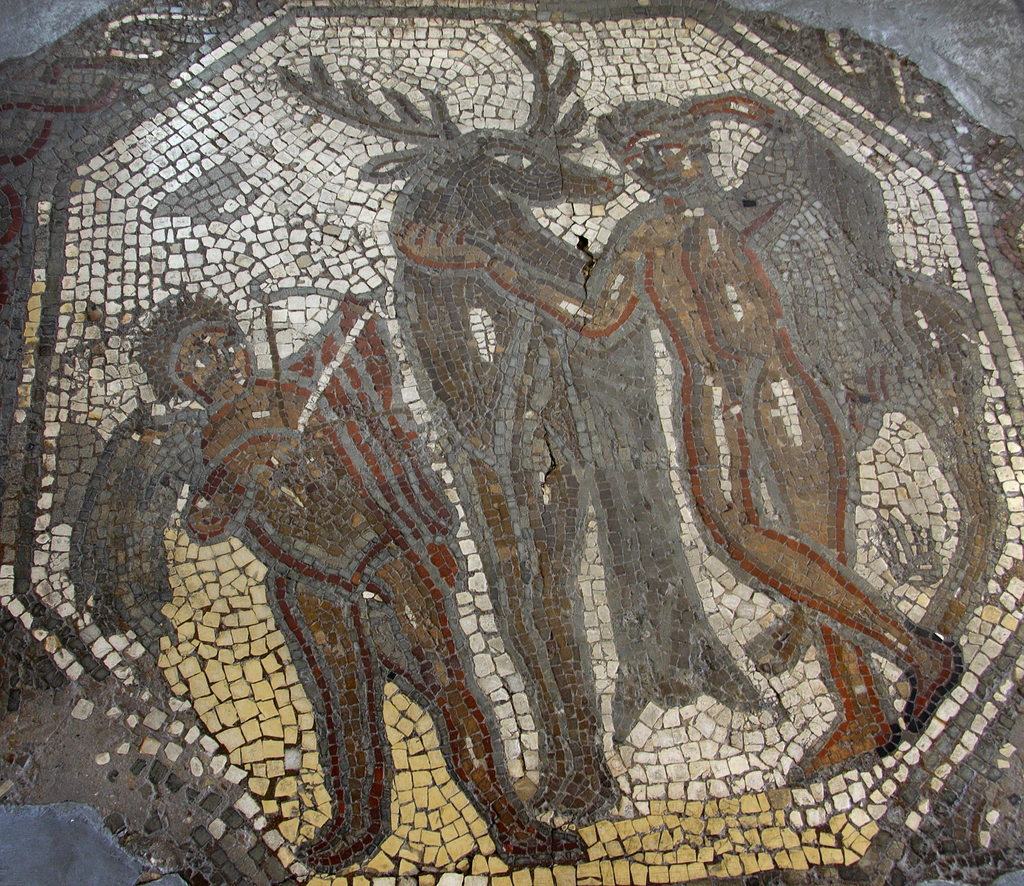
Mosaic of Cyparissus found in Ratae Corieltauvorum depicting Cupid.

Ovid's Cyparissus is a handosme youth from Ceos who was loved by the god Apollo, and deeply cared after a sacred, gold-antlered stag. One summer day while hunting, Cyparissus accidentally pierced the animal with his spear and killed it. He was so grief-stricken at accidentally killing his pet that he asked Apollo to let his tears fall forever. The god tried to console him to no avail and finally turned the boy into a cypress tree (Latin: cupressus) per his wishes, whose sap forms droplets like tears on the trunk.

Ovid frames the tale within the story of Orpheus, whose failure to retrieve his bride Eurydice from the underworld causes him to forsake the love of women in favor of that of boys. When Orpheus plays his lyre, even the trees are moved by the music; in the famous cavalcade of trees that ensues, the position of the cypress at the end prompts a transition to the metamorphosis of Cyparissus.

=== Other authors ===
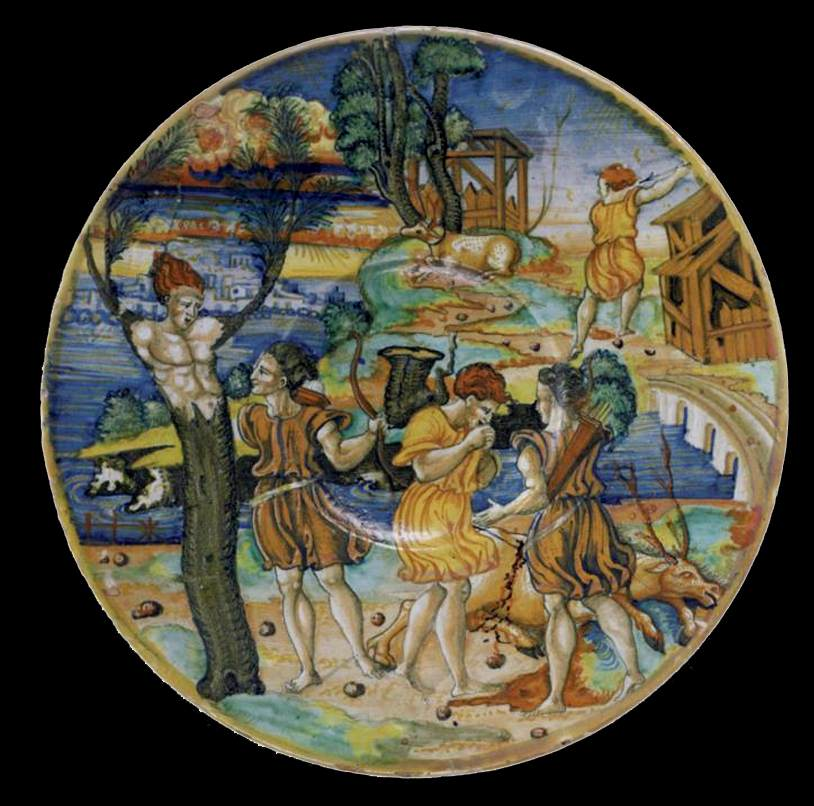
Three scenes from the myth of Cyparissus on 16th-century lusterware by Giorgio Andreoli; the god who embraces the transforming youth holds a branch in his hand

According to one of the Vatican Mythographers, another Roman tradition makes the lover out to be the woodland god Silvanus. An invocation by Virgil of "Silvanus who bears the slender cypress uprooted" was explained in the commentary of Servius as alluding to a love affair. In his brief account, Servius differs from Ovid mainly in substituting Silvanus for Apollo, but also changes the gender of the deer and makes the god responsible for its death:

Silvanus loved a boy (puer) named Cyparissus who had a tame deer. When Silvanus unintentionally killed her, the boy was consumed by sorrow. The lover-god turned him into the tree that has his name, which he is said to carry as a consolation.

It is unclear whether Servius is inventing an aition, a story to explain why Silvanus was depicted holding an evergreen bough, or recording an otherwise unknown version. Elsewhere, Servius mentions a version in which the lover of Cyparissus was Zephyrus, the god of the West Wind. The cypress, he notes, was associated with the underworld, either because they don't grow back when pruned too severely, or because in Attica households in mourning are garlanded with cypress.

Nonnus wrote that Zephyrus found solace in the arms of Cyparissus after the death of his beloved Hyacinthus (who had also been romantically linked with Apollo).

== Background ==
=== As initiation myth ===
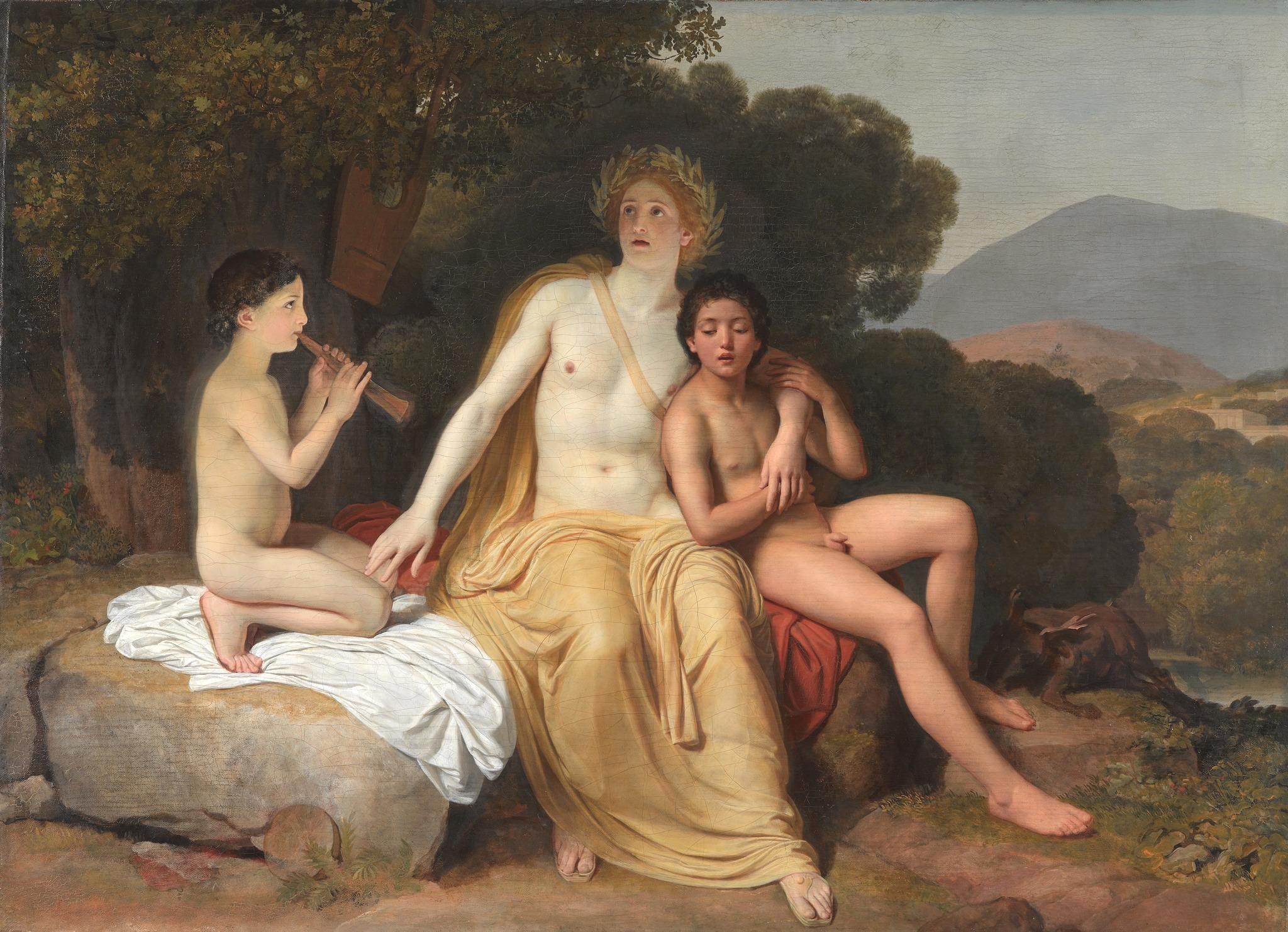
Apollo, Hyacinthus, and Cyparissus Making Music and Singing by Alexander Andreyevich Ivanov, 1831–1834

The myth of Cyparissus, like that of Hyacinthus, has often been interpreted as reflecting the social custom of pederasty in ancient Greece, with the boy the beloved (eromenos) of Apollo. Pederastic myth represents the process of initiation into adult male life, with a "death" and transfiguration for the eromenos. "In all these tales", notes Karl Kerényi, "the beautiful boys are doubles of [Apollo] himself."

The stag as a gift from Apollo reflects the custom in Archaic Greek society of the older male (erastēs) giving his beloved an animal, an act often alluded to in vase painting. In the initiatory context, the hunt is a supervised preparation for the manly arts of war and a testing ground for behavior, with the stag embodying the gift of the hunter's prey.

Similarly, the myth was used to explain the connection of the cypress tree to mourning and sorrow. Forbes-Irving has argued that the cypress as tree of mourning was mostly a Roman tradition, with little evidence of it playing such a role in Greek society. It is possible however that the earlier Greek source of Cyparissus's myth diverged significantly from the surviving later ones, and was originally used to explain the connection of the cypress to Apollo specifically.

== In botany ==
The word Cupressus was used to describe a genus of cypress trees; this genus was first described in the 18th century by the Swedish biologist Linnaeus. In modern times there is a taxonomic debate regarding which species should be retained in the genus Cupressus.

== See also ==
- Syrinx
- Hyacinthus
- Branchus
- Rhodopis and Euthynicus
