= Jacopo Vignali =

Italian painter (1592–1664)

- Self-portrait, c. 1640-1660, Uffizi, Florence
- Born: September 5, 1592; Pratovecchio, Italy
- Died: August 3, 1664 (aged 71); Florence, Grand Duchy of Tuscany
- Resting place: San Michele Visdomini
- Education: Matteo Rosselli
- Known for: Painting
- Notable work: Cyparissus (1623–1625)
- Movement: Baroque

Jacopo Vignali, also known as Jacopo da Prato Vecchio, (September 5, 1592 – August 3, 1664) was an Italian painter of the early Baroque period. He has been described by Charles McCorquodale as "one of the most poetic and sensitive of Florentine painters".

== Biography ==
=== Early life and education ===
Jacopo Vignali was born in Pratovecchio, near Arezzo, to Cosimo di Jacopo Vignali and Giulia d’Antonio del Medico. Showing a talent for drawing from a young age, he was sent by his parents to a teacher in Pratovecchio. In 1605, he moved to Florence to live with an uncle named Arcangiolo, who was a priest. His uncle introduced him to the painter Matteo Rosselli, who took him on as an apprentice in his studio. In 1616, Michelangelo Buonarroti the Younger commissioned Vignali to paint a fresco depicting the Love of the Fatherland in the Casa Buonarroti. This marked the beginning of a long-lasting professional relationship with Michelangelo the Younger, which continued until 1628, as well as Vignali's debut as an independent painter.

That same year, he matriculated in the Accademia delle Arti del Disegno and produced an altarpiece depicting the Madonna and Saints for the sanctuary of the Madonna delle Grazie al Sasso in Pontassieve. Other works from this period include the fresco portrait of Fra Angelo Maria Montorsoli, painted around 1618 in the great cloister of the Santissima Annunziata under the supervision of Rosselli, and the altarpiece depicting The First Mass of Saint Philip Benizi, located in the Oratorio of San Girolamo e San Francesco Poverino. In the 1620s, he painted the fresco The Last Supper for the Servite convent of Monte Senario in Vaglia. The rendering of the figures' facial features and the vibrant colour palette clearly evoke the contemporary paintings of Jacopo's fellow student, Giovanni da San Giovanni – an influence that is even more evident in the series of frescoes depicting the Saints and Blesseds of Tuscany, which Jacopo produced for the Camera degli Angeli in Casa Buonarroti between 1621 and 1622.

=== Mature work ===
From the early 1620s onwards, Vignali produced a significant body of work that evolved through several distinct stylistic phases. These reveal the painter’s innate tendency to experiment with different artistic languages simultaneously, as he constantly sought alternative ways of manipulating colour and light. While some works completed in 1621, such as the Healing of Tobit (Figline Valdarno, Fondazione Giovanni Pratesi), Job Visited by His Friends (Prague, National Gallery), and the ceiling fresco Jacob's Dream in the Casa Buonarroti still exhibit characteristics reminiscent of Matteo Rosselli and, at times, Ludovico Cigoli, other contemporary paintings betray a direct familiarity with the clear, luminous style of Orazio Gentileschi and the vigorous naturalism of Guercino. Examples of these influences can be seen in St. Cecilia (Dublin, National Gallery of Ireland), Calendimaggio (Rome, Palazzo Corsini) and the large canvas the Investiture of St. Benedict (Florence, Seminario Maggiore). The latter was originally part of a collaborative cycle commissioned by the Compagnia di San Benedetto Bianco between 1620 and 1621.

In 1622, Vignali became a full member of the Accademia del Disegno. That same year, he contributed to the fresco cycles in the Casino Mediceo di San Marco in Florence, executed under the artistic supervision of Rosselli. Vignali painted five lunettes in the room dedicated to Ferdinando I and the canvas Tobias and the Angel (Lucca, Museo Nazionale di Palazzo Mansi), for the art collection of Cardinal Carlo de' Medici. The following year, he created a replica of this work and gifted it to the nearby Farmacia di San Marco.

Christ Showing His Wounds to Saint Bernard of Clairvaux (1623), Santi Simone e Giuda, Florence

In 1623, Vignali took part in another collaborative project led by his teacher, Rosselli, executing a lunette depicting St. Lucy for the Room of the Virgin Martyrs at the Villa del Poggio Imperiale. The pivotal work of this period, however, is the altarpiece Christ Showing His Wounds to Saint Bernard of Clairvaux (1623; Santi Simone e Giuda, Florence), notable for its intense, emotional style and masterful use of light. The altarpiece clearly shows the influence of Caravaggio as mediated by Rutilio di Lorenzo Manetti. Similar lighting effects characterize another work from the same period: St. Peter Healing St. Agatha. This painting belongs to a series of canvases dedicated to pharmacology, originally housed in the Farmacia di San Marco. The series also includes Tobias and the Angel, The Baptism of Constantine and the later Good Samaritan (1630; Florence, Museo Nazionale di San Marco). The warm palette and intense light contrasts that characterise these paintings also appear in Cyparissus (1623–1625; Strasbourg, Musée des Beaux-Arts), which represents one of the pinnacles of Vignali’s art.

After visiting Rome on occasion of the 1625 Jubilee, Vignali became influenced by the austere Counter-Maniera style of Domenico Passignano and Francesco Curradi. In 1625 he opened his own workshop on Via della Crocetta. His pupils included Domenico Bettini, Romolo Panfi, Alessandro Rosi, and Carlo Dolci. Works from this period include the Nativity of the Virgin in the church of Sant’Agostino in Sansepolcro, commissioned by Remigio Cantagallina, as well as a cabinet painting depicting the Finding of Moses. (priv. col.). In his Christ Comforted by an Angel at Santa Lucia alla Castellina, dating from 1626, Vignali developed a poignant, emotionally charged image that foreshadows the devotional painting of Dolci, drawing inspiration from the works of Francesco Curradi. This work contrasts starkly with the vivid atmosphere of his Rebecca and Eliezer at the Well (1627; Vicenza, Banca Popolare) – a painting intended for a secular setting. A profound, light-infused mysticism resurfaces in the monumental Mystical Communion of the Blessed Clare of Montefalco, (1629; Santo Spirito, Florence), inspired by Giovanni Lanfranco’s depictions of saintly ecstasy.

As the plague epidemic of 1629–1631 spread through Tuscany, Vignali responded to the growing demand for devotional art by producing a large number of paintings for public and private patrons from 1630 onwards. These works include a portrait of the mystic Domenica Narducci (1631; San Salvi, Florence), gifted to Grand Duchess Christina of Lorraine by the nuns of the Convent of the Crocetta, and the Virgin and Saints (131; San Bartolomeo a Ripoli). From 1632 onwards, Vignali received a sharp increase in commissions and patrons. This period of intense activity included the well-known fresco and canvas decorations for the Bonsi Chapel in the Church of Santi Michele e Gaetano in Florence (1632) and the canvas painting Pyramus and Thisbe (London, priv. col.), commissioned by Cosimo and Gabriello Riccardi for their casino at Valfonda, Florence.

=== Later works ===
In the mid-1630s, Vignali realized the altarpiece depicting the Virgin and five saints, commissioned by Alessandro Medici for the Sacristy of the Madonna at the Santissima Annunziata. In this work, Vignali aimed to recreate the serene atmosphere of his earlier paintings, drawing inspiration from Carlo Dolci's contemporary style. Also dating to this period are two works inspired by the epic poems of Torquato Tasso and Ludovico Ariosto: Armida Chaining Rinaldo (1634; Vienna, priv. col.) executed for Benedetto Dragomanni, and Ruggiero Found by Leone and Melissa (1636; Florence, Galleria Palatina) commissioned by Cardinal Carlo de' Medici.

At the beginning of the 1640s, Vignali produced a significant body of work, including cartoons for tapestries at the Arazzeria Medicea and frescoes in the Accolti Chapel at the Basilica of the Santissima Annunziata. In 1649, he produced one of his finest works: the Martyrdom of St. Lucy (Florence, Santissima Annunziata, Colloredo Chapel), which reveals the influence of the morbid sensuality of Felice Ficherelli and the dramatic, proto-Romantic style of Salvator Rosa. Another impressive work is the Madonna and St. Liborius in the Church of San Jacopo sopr'Arno, dating to the late 1650s. In April 1663, Vignali suffered a stroke that left him almost completely paralyzed. He died in Florence on 3 August 1664 and was buried in the Church of San Michele Visdomini in Florence.

== Selected Works ==
The Mystic Marriage of St. Catherine, Hermitage Museum, Saint Petersburg

- Cyparissus, Musée des Beaux-Arts de Strasbourg;
- The Pharaoh's daughter presents Moses, Finnish National Gallery, Helsinki;
- St. Gregory the Great, Walters Art Museum, Baltimore;
- Elijah Awakened by an Angel in the Desert, Museu Nacional de Belas Artes, Rio de Janeiro;
- Madonna with Angels and Saints, Museo Nazionale d'Arte Medievale e Moderna, Arezzo;
- Job Visited by His Friends, National Gallery Prague;
- Calendimaggio, Palazzo Corsini, Rome;
- St. Cecilia, National Gallery of Ireland, Dublin:
- Tobias and the Angel, Museo Nazionale di Palazzo Mansi, Lucca;
- Orpheus and Eurydice, Musée de Tessé, Le Mans;
- The Good Samaritan, Museo Nazionale di San Marco, Florence;
- Ruggiero Found by Leone and Melissa, Galleria Palatina, Florence;
- Abraham and Three Angels, Hermitage Museum, Saint Petersburg;
- The Mystic Marriage of St. Catherine, Hermitage Museum, Saint Petersburg;
- St. Louis of France Visiting an Alms House, Princeton University Art Museum;
- The Triumph of David, Bob Jones University Museum & Gallery, Greenville, South Carolina.
Cyparissus, Musée des Beaux-Arts de Strasbourg

David with the Head of Goliath, Budapest, Museum of Fine Arts

The Pharaoh's daughter presents Moses, Helsinki, Finnish National Gallery

St. Gregory the Great, Walters Art Museum

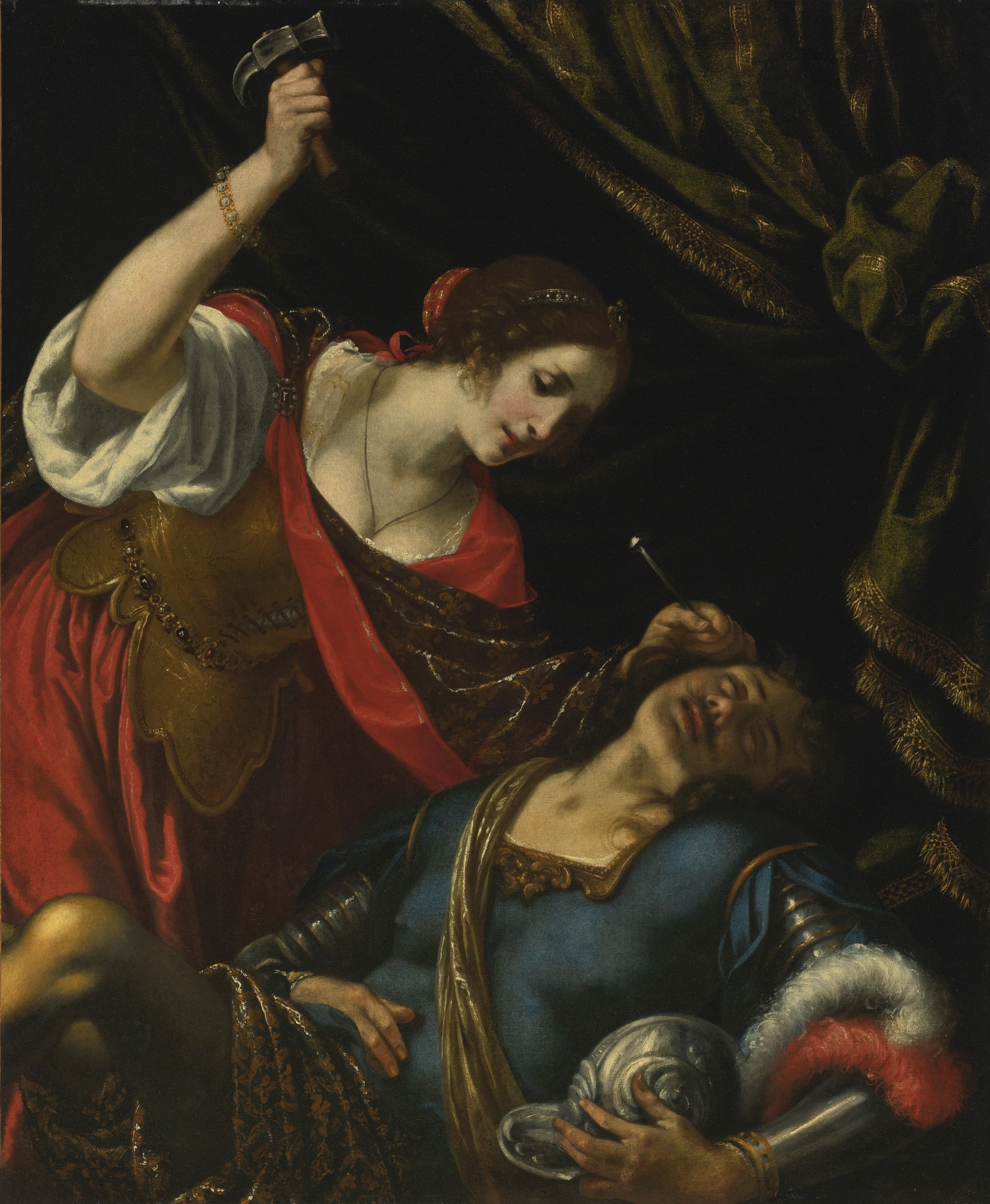
Jael and Sisera, priv. col.

Guardian Angel, Pisa, Santa Croce in Fossabanda

Elijah Awakened by an Angel in the Desert, Museu Nacional de Belas Artes, Rio de Janeiro

Orpheus and Eurydice, Le Mans, Musée de Tessé

== Bibliography ==
- McCorquodale, Charles (1979). Painting in Florence. 1600-1700. Exh. cat. London: Royal Academy of Arts.
- Wittkower, Rudolf (1980). Art and Architecture in Italy, 1600-1750. Pelican History of Art. New York: Penguin Books. p. 344.
- Pagliarulo, Giovanni (2003). "Vignali, Jacopo". Grove Art Online. Oxford: Oxford University Press. doi:10.1093/gao/9781884446054.article.T089467.
- Fabbri, Maria Cecilia (2020). "VIGNALI, Jacopo". Dizionario Biografico degli Italiani (in Italian). Vol. 99: Verrazzano–Vittorio Amedeo. Rome: Institute of the Italian Encyclopaedia. ISBN 978-88-12-00032-6.
