= Rubbiani =

Rubbiani is a surname. Notable people with the surname include:

- Felice Rubbiani (1677–1752), Italian painter
- Matteo Rubbiani (born 1978), Italian pole vaulter
- Alfonso Rubbiani (born 1848), letterato notevole
