= Cyparissus (Vignali) =

Painting by Jacopo Vignali

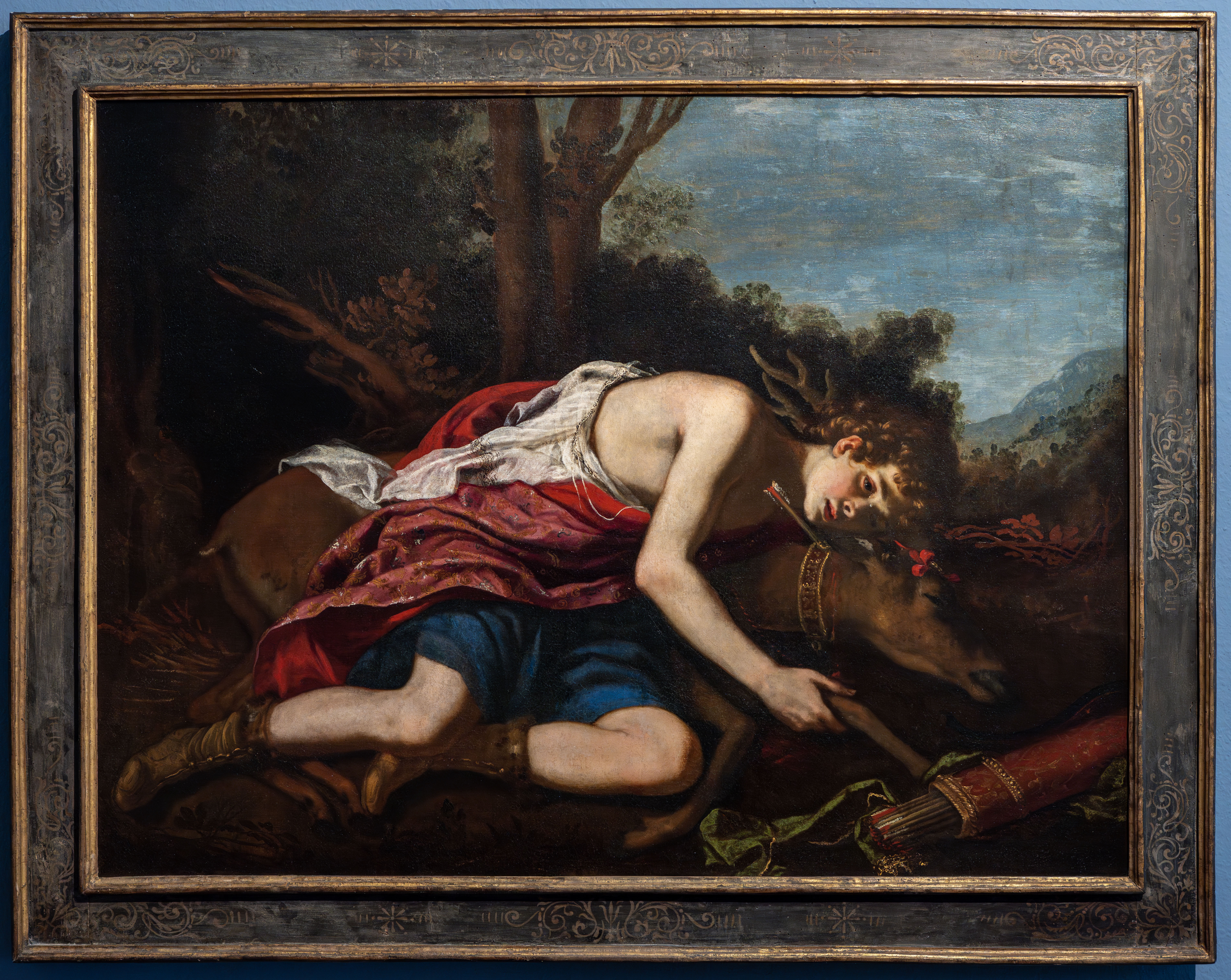
- Artist: Jacopo Vignali
- Year: c. 1625
- Medium: oil painting on canvas
- Movement: Baroque painting Mythological painting
- Subject: Cyparissus
- Dimensions: 123 cm × 163 cm (48 in × 64 in)
- Location: Musée des Beaux-Arts, Strasbourg
- Accession: 1994

Cyparissus is a 1620s Baroque painting on a mythological subject from Ovid's Metamorphoses by the Italian painter Jacopo Vignali. It is on display in the Musée des Beaux-Arts of Strasbourg, France, to which it had been donated by the collectors Othon Kaufmann and François Schlageter in 1994. Its inventory number is 994-1-8, or 44.994.1.8.

The painting depicts the young Cyparissus, mourning his pet deer, that he had mistakenly killed with his own bow and arrow. The young boy's pain is amplified beyond the description given by Ovid, and possibly inspired by a 1624 Venetian edition of Giovanni Andrea dell' Anguillara's Metamorfosi ridotte in ottava rima, in which the tearful aspect of the story is emphasized. It is one of the very few profane paintings by Vignali.
