= Domenico Bettini =

Italian painter (1644–1705)

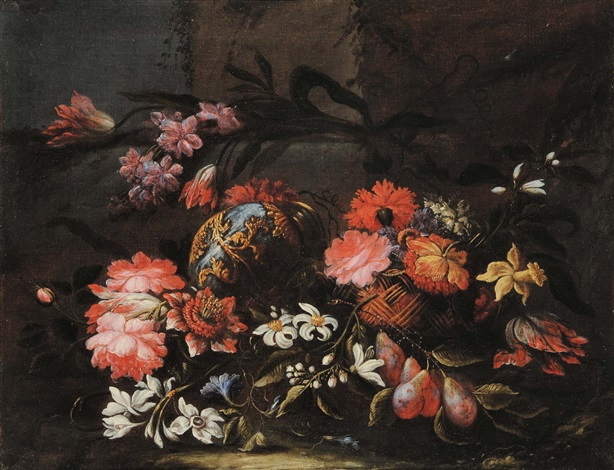
- Still life With Flowers, priv. col.
- Born: July 21, 1644; Florence, Grand Duchy of Tuscany
- Died: November 3, 1705 (aged 61); Bologna, Papal States
- Education: Jacopo Vignali
- Known for: Painting
- Movement: Baroque

Domenico Bettini (21 July 1644 – 3 November 1705) was an Italian painter of the Baroque period, mainly depicting still-life subjects.

== Biography ==
He was born in Florence on 21 July 1644; at twelve he entered the workshop of the Florentine painter Jacopo Vignali, where he remained for about eight years: from this period of his formation are some lunettes frescoed in the first cloister of Santa Maria del Carmine, two of which (Elijah Fed by an Angel and Elijah Builds a Temple on the Site of the Sacrifice of Abraham) are signed and dated 166 ... (1660?); four others of the same cloister (Elijah Raises the Child of Sidon's Widow, Elijah Covers Elisha with his Cloak, Elijah Heals the Water of a Spring, the Children Saved by the Bears) were ascribed to him by Richa.

Bettini's signed and dated 1661 Guardian Angel was found in the church of Saints Simone and Giuda in Corniola (Empoli). In this latter canvas, so clearly youthful in the uncertainties and imbalances of the composition, one recognizes the teachings of Vignali, and echoes of the Florentine culture of the time.

Bettini, soon after his marriage at the age of twenty, left for Rome, where he apprenticed with Mario Nuzzi (Mario dei Fiori) for a few years; then, he moved to northern Italy to study and he worked for the duke of Parma. Biographers of the early eighteenth century, such as (Baldinucci and Sagrestani) list him as working for the duke of Parma, the duke of Modena (from 1670 onwards for eighteen years), the marquis Muzio Spada of Faenza from 1685 to 1701, and finally Bolognese lords. In 1703 the painter moved from Modena to Bologna, where he died on the 4th of November 1705.

Other details of his biography and work are sparse; in part, because still life was considered minor painting, sold mostly to private households. Many inventories list such works merely as a still-life, leaving the precise subject undefined, and thus hindering a precise delineation of a reliable catalogue of Bettini works.

One of his pupils was Felice Rubbiani of Modena.

== Bibliography ==
- Bryan, Michael (1886). Robert Edmund Graves (ed.). Dictionary of Painters and Engravers, Biographical and Critical. Vol. I: A-K. London: George Bell and Sons. p. 122.
- Meloni, Silvia (1967). "BETTINI, Domenico". Dizionario Biografico degli Italiani (in Italian). Vol. 9: Berengario–Biagini. Rome: Istituto dell'Enciclopedia Italiana. ISBN 978-88-12-00032-6.
