= Romolo Panfi =

Italian painter (1632–1690)

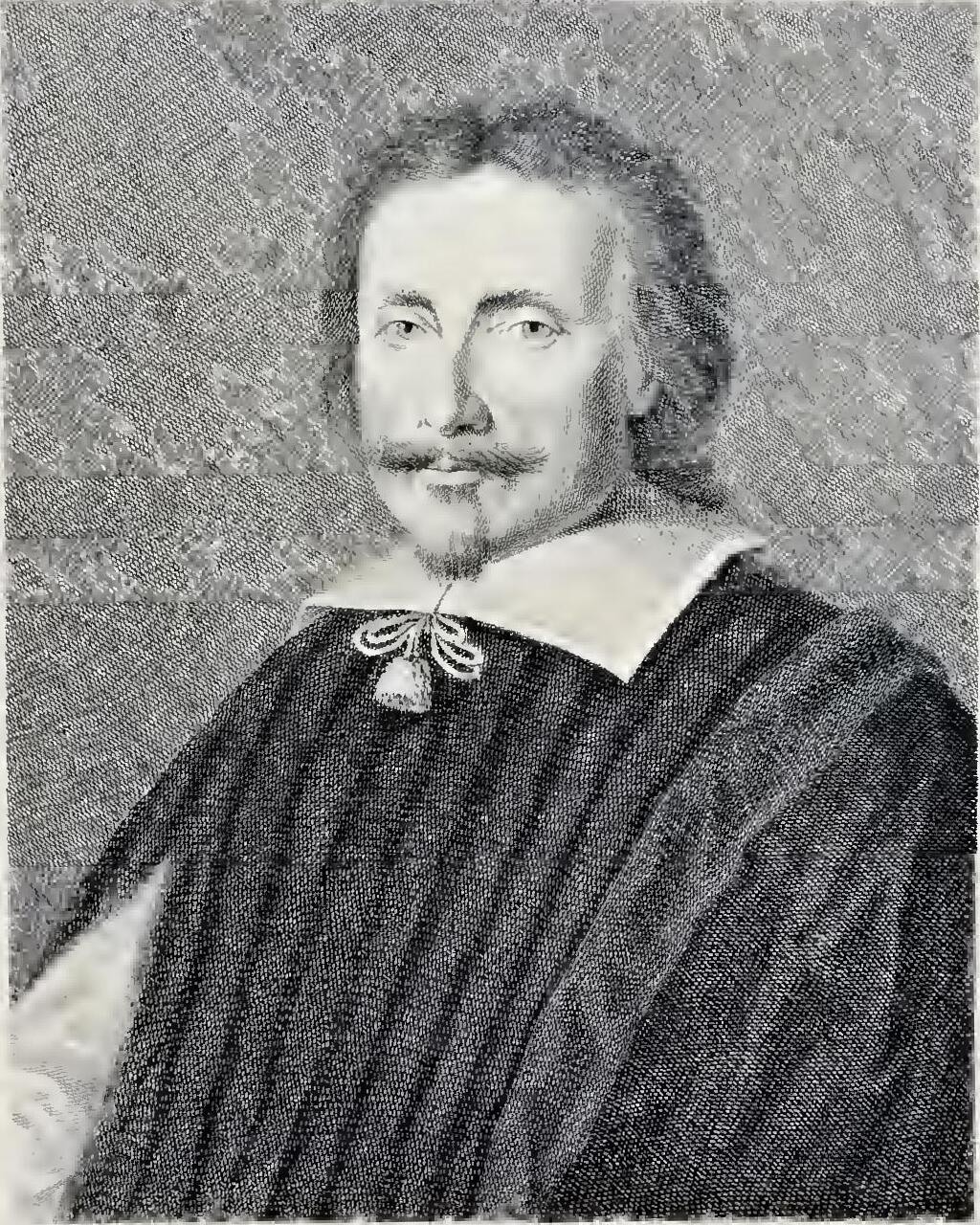
- Born: 1632; Florence
- Died: 1690 (aged 57–58); Carmignano
- Occupation: Painter

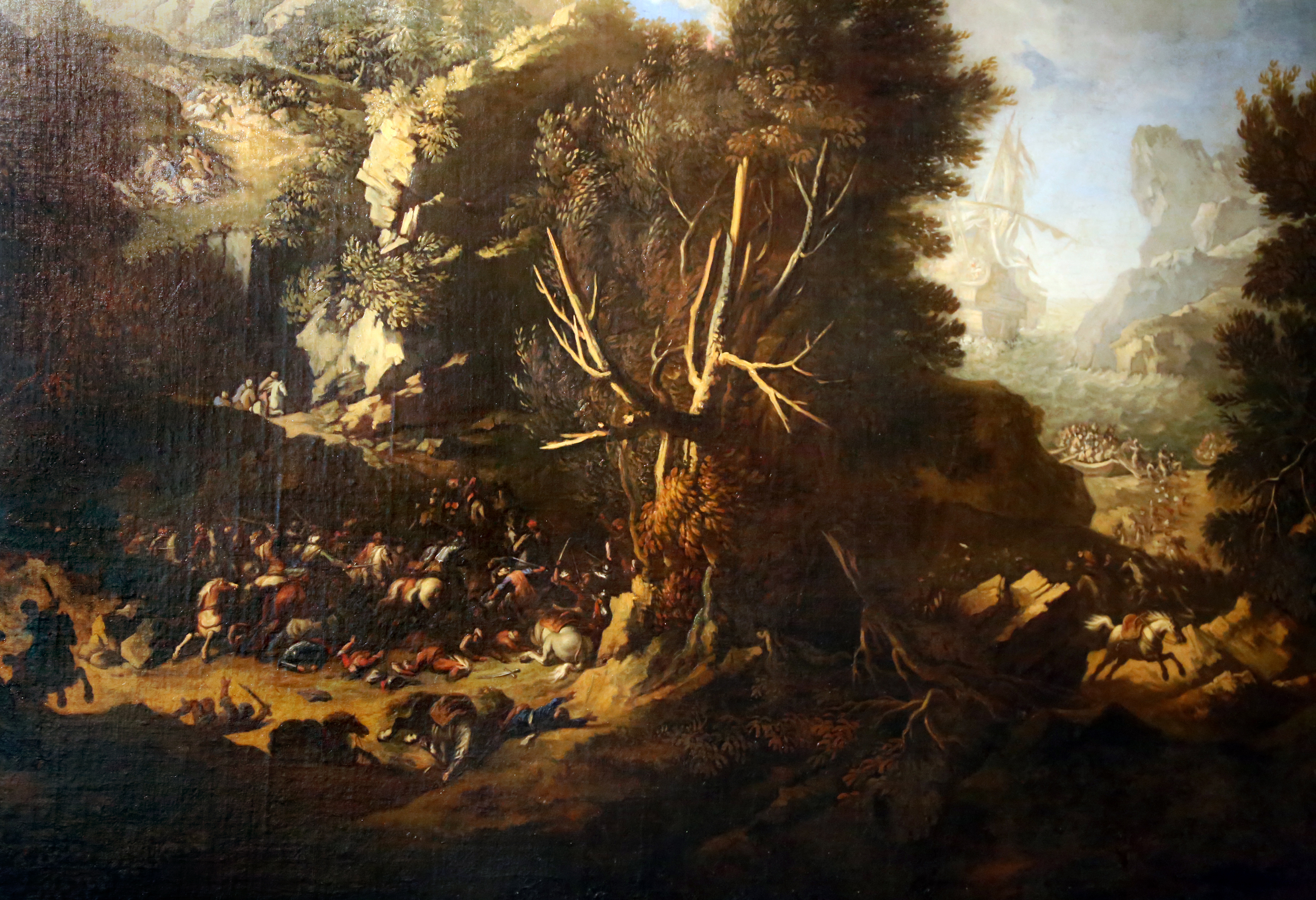
Landscape with Castle set Afire found in Villa La Petraia, Tuscany

Romolo Panfi (1632 in Florence – 1690 in Carmignano) was an Italian painter, active in Tuscany. He was active mainly as a battle painter and landscapes.

He was a pupil of Jacopo Vignali and worked in the Medici court of Grand Duke Ferdinand and his brother, Cardinal Leopoldo de' Medici, where Panfi was said to be talented as a musician and dancer. One of his pupils was Giovanni Camillo Sagrestani
