= Stefano della Bella =

Italian draughtsman and printmaker

Stefano Della Bella
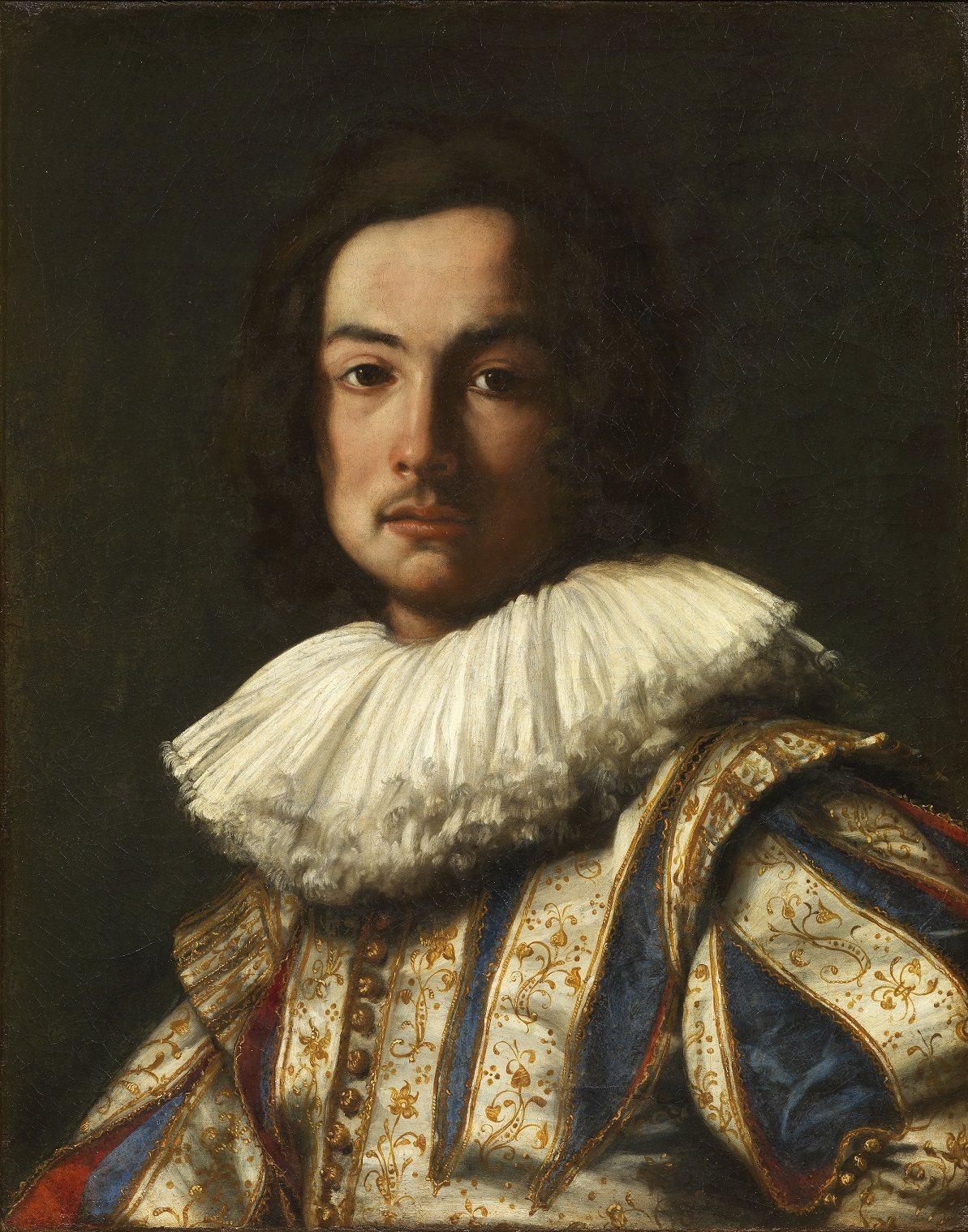
- Portrait by Carlo Dolci
- Born: 18 May 1610; Florence, Grand Duchy of Tuscany
- Died: 12 July 1664 (aged 54); Florence, Grand Duchy of Tuscany
- Known for: Engraver
- Movement: Baroque

Stefano della Bella (18 May 1610 – 12 July 1664) was an Italian draughtsman and printmaker known for etchings of a great variety of subjects, including military and court scenes, landscapes, and lively genre scenes. He left 1052 prints, and several thousand drawings, but only one known painting. He was born and later died in Florence, Italy.

== Early life in Florence ==
Della Bella was born at Florence to a family of artists, and was apprenticed to a goldsmith, but became an engraver working briefly under Orazio Vanni and then Cesare Dandini. He studied etching under Remigio Cantagallina, who had also been the instructor of Jacques Callot. Della Bella's early prints are very similar to those of Callot. When he was seventeen years of age, he presented an etching depicting a banquet in the Palazzo Pitti to the young Giancarlo de' Medici following which della Bella would receive official commissions by the Medici family. In 1630, at the age of twenty, he produced a manuscript copy from one of the many manuscript versions of Leonardo da Vinci's Trattato della Pittura. He illustrated his copy with about 50 sketches. Della Bella's copy was published in 1792 with "accurate engravings of all of his sketches." By 1632 or 1633 he was the recipient of direct patronage from Lorenzo de' Medici (brother to Cosimo II and uncle to Giancarlo de' Medici). At this time Della Bella requested from his patron permission to go to Rome "to perfect himself as an artist."

== Work in Rome ==
Having arrived in Rome in 1633, della Bella lived and studied there for six years. He resided in the Medici Palace, producing vedute and drawings of antiquities as well as crowded images of public occasions in a series of sketchbooks. Many of these images were later turned into prints. He also recorded and assisted the court festivities of the Medici. In this period della Bella's style developed from Mannerist to Baroque. Della Bella created a series of six prints forming a long, 2.5-meter panel, showing the Polish Ambassador’s Ceremonial Entry into Rome in 1633. He also created a number of prints of views of Rome. While living in Rome, he often returned to Florence working on commissions for his clients there.

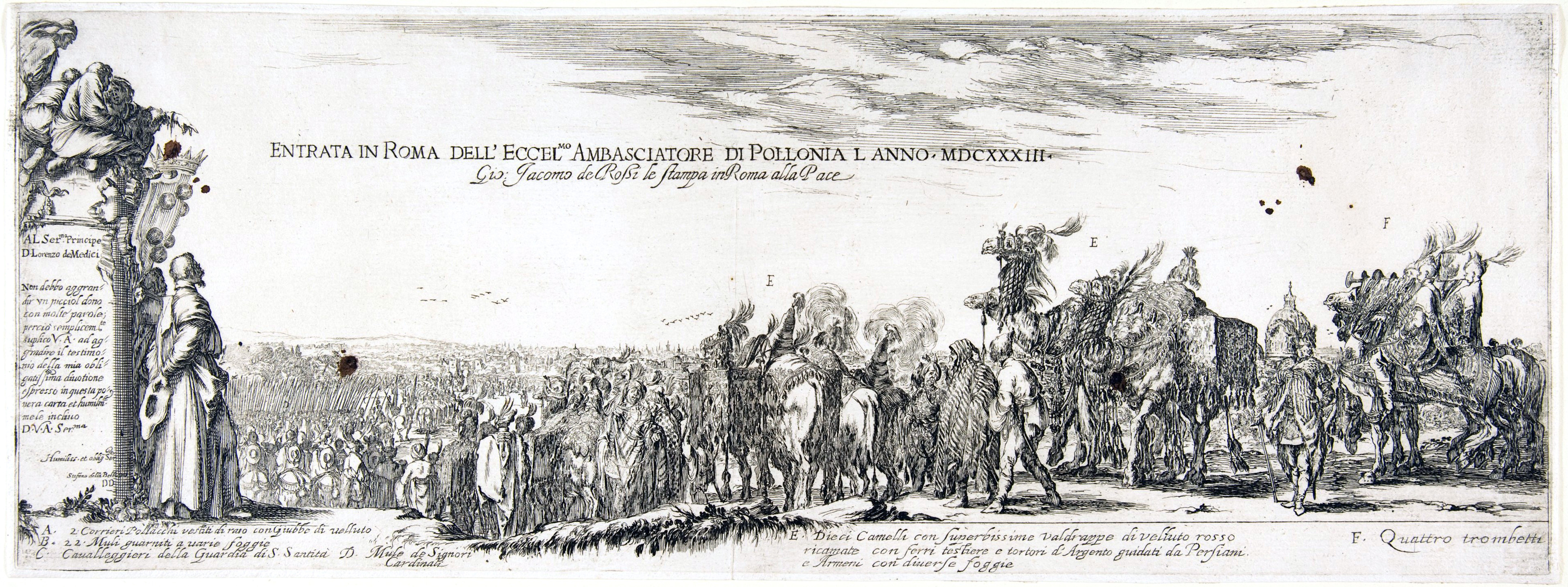
Entry of the Polish Ambassador to Rome, 1633

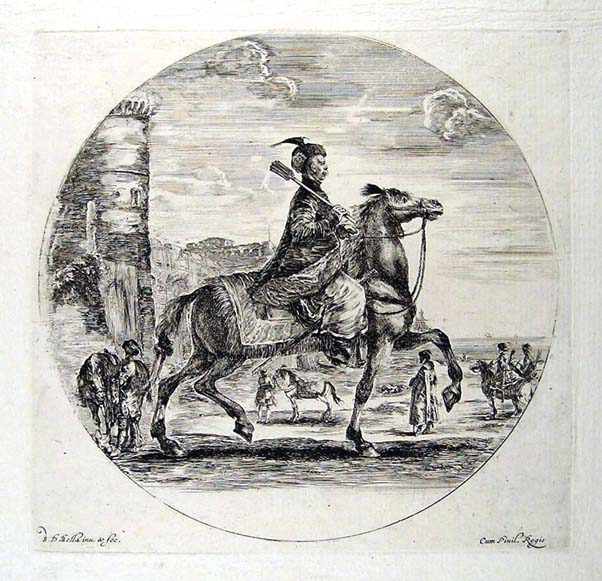
Polish horseman etching

== Paris and the return to Florence ==
In 1639, della Bella went to Paris and lived there until 1650. He adapted his style to French tastes, and was influenced by Rembrandt and other Dutch print makers. Della Bella made trips to Holland and North Africa.

The majority of della Bella's prints date from the years in Paris; he had arrived four years after the death of Callot, and was already known to important French publishers. In 1641 Cardinal Richelieu sent him to Arras to make drawings for prints of the siege and taking of that town by the royal army, and in 1644 Cardinal Mazarin commissioned four sets of educational playing cards for the young Louis XIV. His ornament prints were very innovative, seeming to look forward to the Rococo.

Della Bella also engraved views of Paris, including a very large print of the Pont Neuf, looking south from the entrance of the Place Dauphine, with topographically accurate depictions of the buildings south of the bridge on the banks of the Seine, such as the Church of Saint-Germain l'Auxerrois, the Petit Bourbon and the Louvre Palace on the right bank and the Hôtel de Nevers, the Tour de Nesle, and in the distance, the Abbey of Saint-Germain-des-Prés, on the left. The road over the bridge and in front of the central platform with the statue of Henri IV is crowded with carriages, wagons, people, and animals. Among the 451 distinct figures are beggars, gypsies, hurdy-gurdy players, children and tooth-pullers, with horses, donkeys, dogs, and even a lamb.

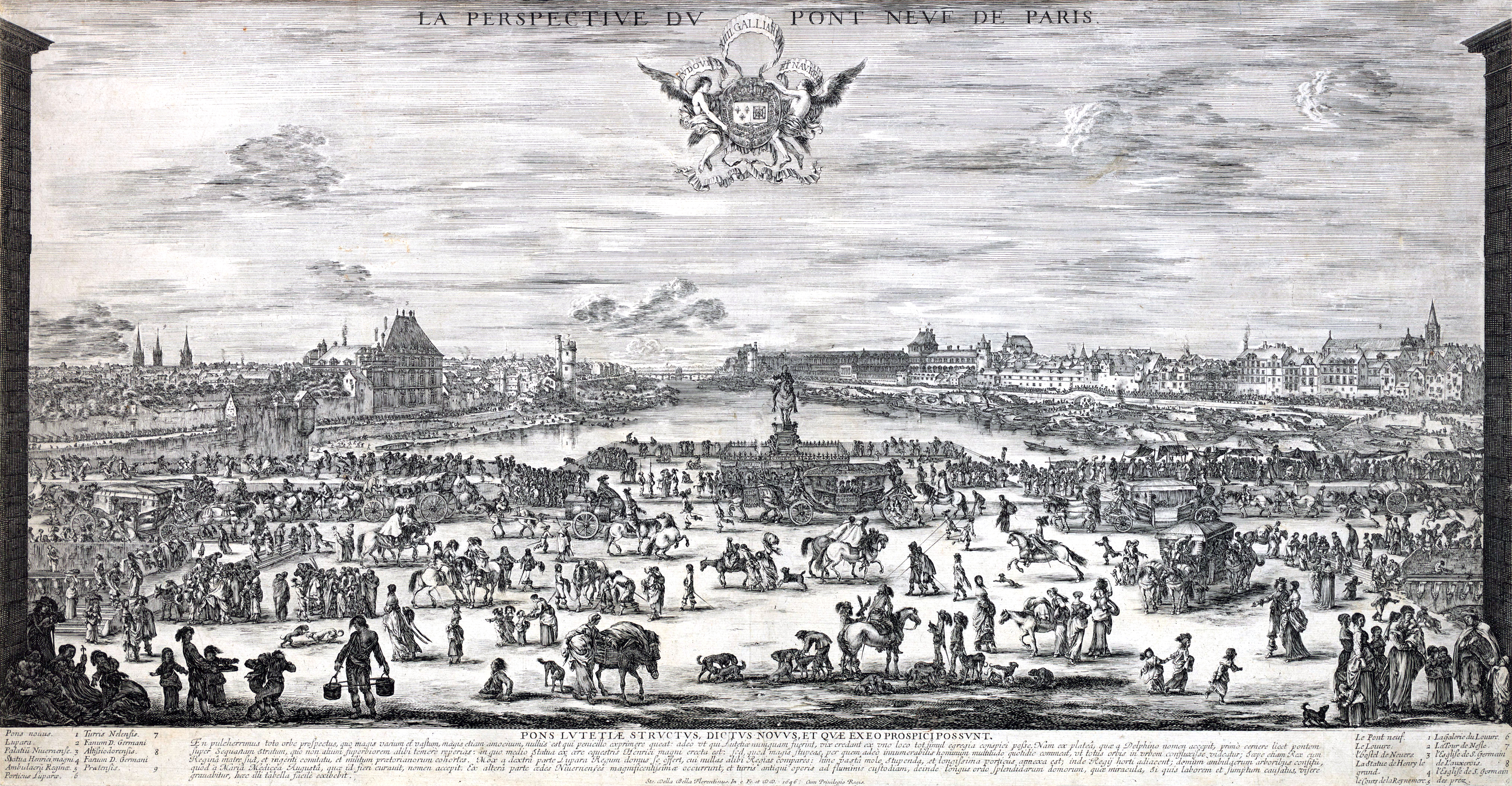
View of the Pont Neuf, 1646

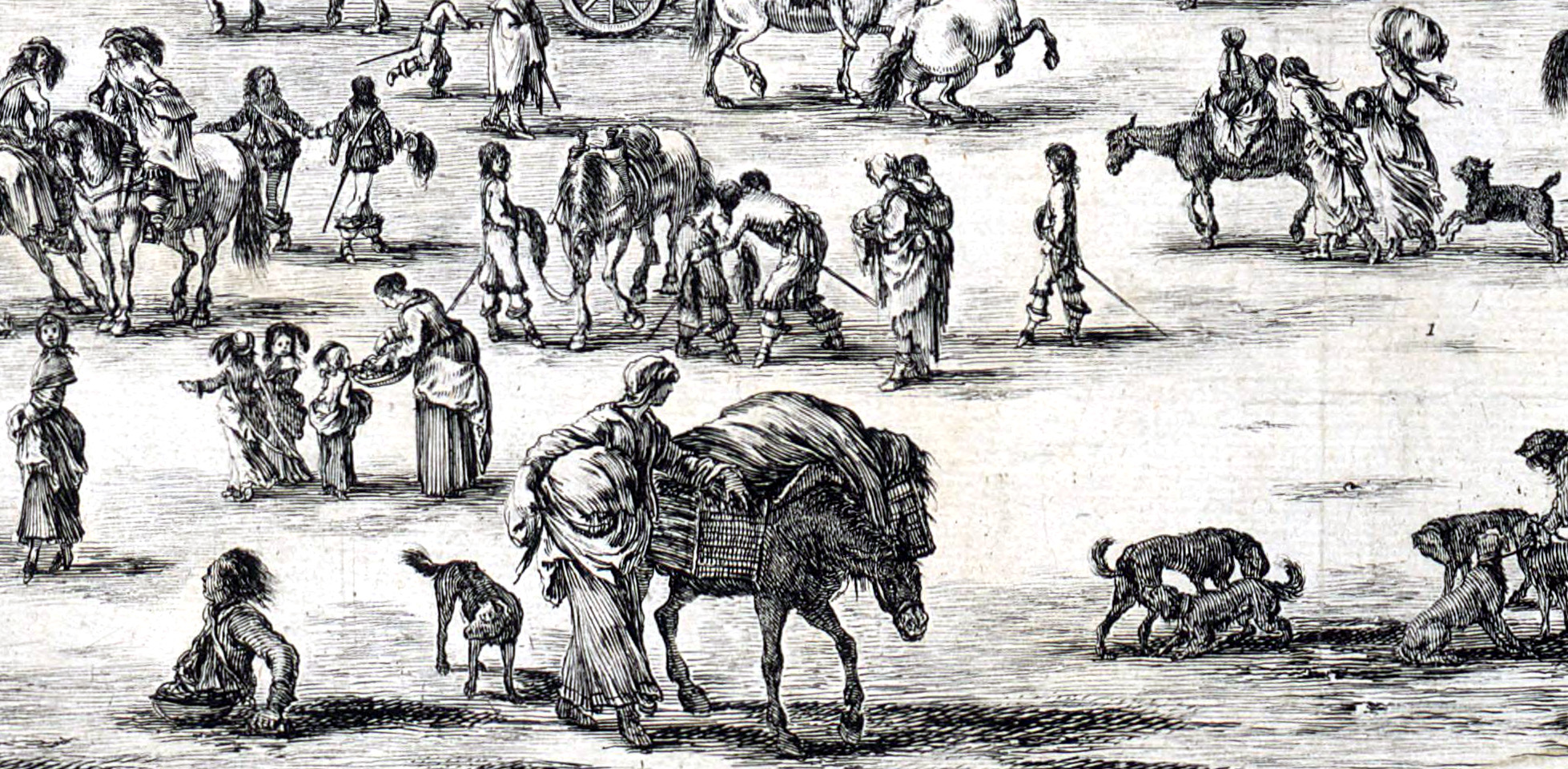
Detail with figures

French anti-Italian feeling during the Fronde, and the death of Mazarin probably forced della Bella's return to Florence, where he obtained a pension from the grand duke, whose son, Cosimo III de' Medici, he instructed in drawing. He continued to send plates to Paris publishers. Della Bella is known to have illustrated some discoveries for Galileo, and depicted Hansken the famous elephant, when dead. In his final years he produced a number of prints experimenting with tonal effects, though these were little known at the time; he had long made much use of wash in his drawings, and was now attempting with considerable success to achieve similar effects in etching, though only a few good impressions could be taken from the plate. In 1661 he appears to have suffered a stroke, after which he produced little work.

Antonio Francesco Lucini was one of his pupils in Florence.

== See also ==
- Decoration for a Thesis in Honor of Saint Francis Solano

== Bibliography ==
- Chisholm, Hugh, ed. (1911). "Della Bella, Stefano" . Encyclopædia Britannica. Vol. 7 (11th ed.). Cambridge University Press. p. 965.
- De Vesme, Alexandre (1906). "Étienne Della Bella", pp. 66–79 and "Oeuvre d'Étienne Della Bella", pp. 79–332", in Le Peintre-Graveur italien (at Internet Archive). Milan: Ulrico Hoepli.
- Massar, Phyllis Dearborn (1968). "Presenting Stefano della Bella." The Metropolitan Museum of Art Bulletin, vol. 27 (New Series), no. 3 (November, 1968), pp. 159–176. ISSN 0026-1521. JSTOR 3258383.
- Massar, Phyllis D. (1971). Stefano Della Bella, Catalogue Raisonné. Alexandre De Vesme with Introduction and Additions by Phyllis Dearborn Massar. New York: Collectors Editions.
- Massar, Phyllis D. (1996). "Bella, Stefano della", vol. 3, pp. 631–634, in The Dictionary of Art (34 vols.), edited by Jane Turner. New York: Grove. ISBN 9781884446009. Also at Oxford Art Online, subscription required (accessed 22 November 2010).
- Reed, Sue Welsh & Wallace, Richard, editors (1989). Italian Etchers of the Renaissance and Baroque, Museum of Fine Arts, Boston. ISBN 0-87846-306-2 or 304-4 (pb)
