= Felice Rubbiani =

Italian painter

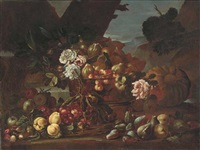
- Still life With Cherries, priv. col.
- Born: December 30, 1677; Modena, Duchy of Modena and Reggio
- Died: October 18, 1752 (aged 74); Modena, Duchy of Modena and Reggio
- Education: Domenico Bettini
- Known for: Painting
- Movement: Baroque

Felice Rubbiani (30 December 1677 – 18 October 1752) was an Italian painter of the Baroque period, mainly depicting still-life subjects.

== Biography ==
He was born in Modena and studied in Bologna under the still-life painter Domenico Bettini. He was called to Modena by the Duke Rinaldo I to help decorations for the wedding of his son Francesco. He was then given a position in the Guarda del Corpo to subsidize his ability to paint.
