= Domenica Narducci =

Italian mystic

Servant of God Domenica of Paradise OP
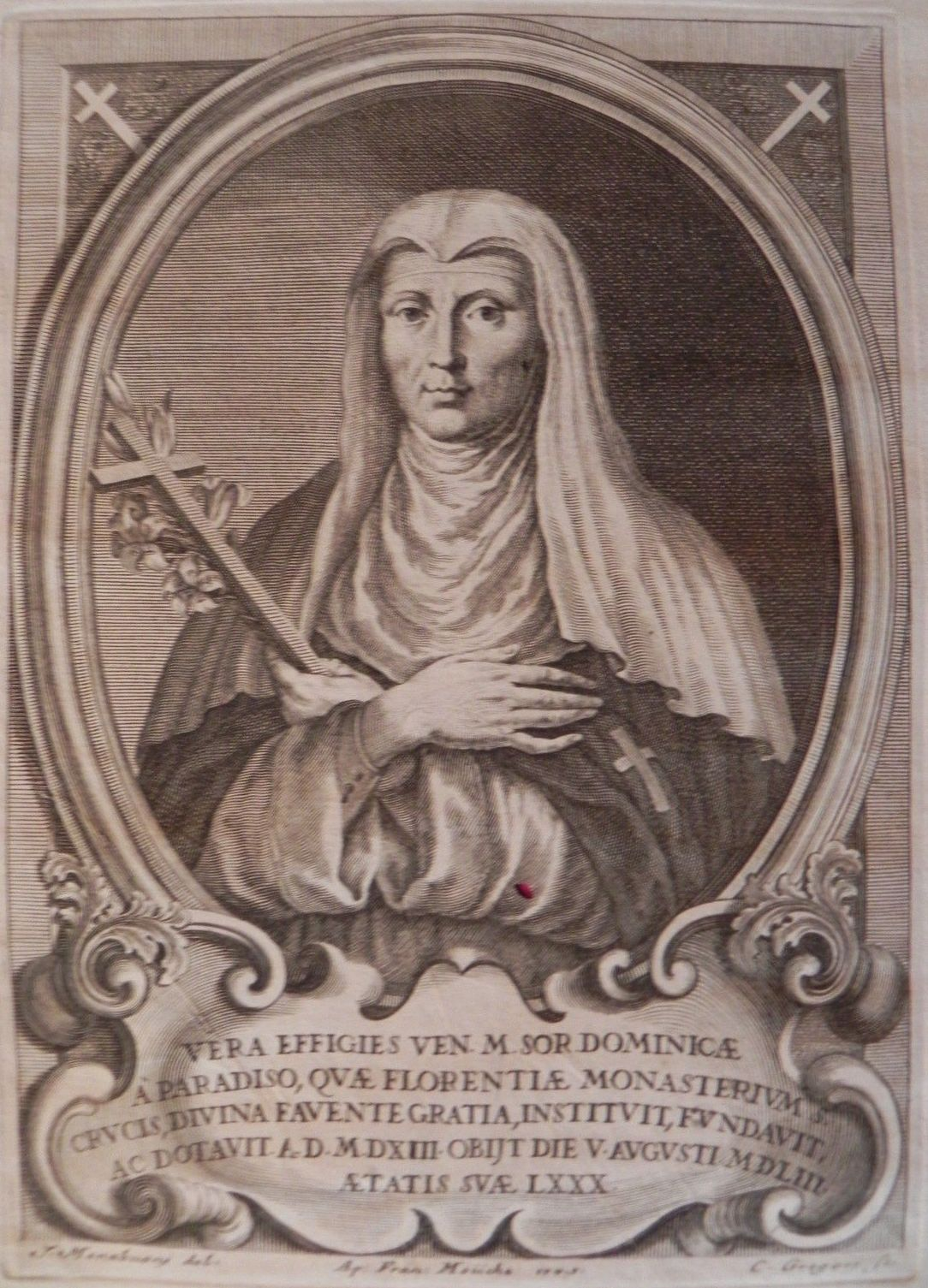
- Born: Domenica Narducci; 3 September 1473; Florence, Italy
- Died: 1553 (79–80); Florence, Italy

Domenica Narducci, OP (religious name Domenica of Paradise; 3 September 1473 – 1553) was an Italian Dominican nun.

== Biography ==
Narducci was born on 3 September 1473 in Bandino area in Florence. She was the daughter of Tommaso di Jacopo Narducci, a farmer and groundskeeper who worked in the gardens of Chiesa di Santa Brigida al Paradiso. In 1499, she fled from the abusive life of a Tuscan farm and sought solace in the Dominican convent of Paradiso. After making her religious vows, she had visions of Jesus that inspired her to found a new convent.

At the new convent, she became known for her extreme piety and assisted the Medici family in spiritual matters. Advocate of her own reforms for the Second order of the Dominicans, she was an outspoken critic of the first order who supported the controversial Dominican preacher Girolamo Savonarola (1452–1498). In 1515, she established the Convento della Crocetta in Florence. She continued to be a significant figure in Italian religious life in later years, exchanging correspondence with Pope Paul III and Clement VII.

She died in 1553 in Florence with a reputation of holiness. Many devout Florentines thought that Narducci had protected them from the plague in the centuries that followed her death.

== Beatification ==
Her cause for beatification was introduced 1624. The process regarding her heroic virtue was brought before the Antepreparatory Congregation8 in 1761 until 1761 and was suspended until the present time. From the examination of the cause, it was assumed that it was treated unskillfully by the advocates.
