= Giovanni Andrea dell' Anguillara =

Italian Renaissance poet and translator

Giovanni Andrea dell'Anguillara
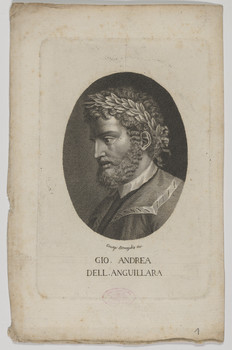
- Giovanni Andrea dell'Anguillara
- Born: c. 1517; Sutri, Papal States
- Died: c. 1572; Rome, Papal States
- Occupations: Poet; Intellectual; Dramatist
- Known for: Italian translation of Ovid's Metamorphoses
- Family: House of Anguillara
- Writing career
- Language: Italian
- Genres: Poetry; drama; translation
- Movement: Renaissance

Giovanni Andrea dell'Anguillara (c. 1517 – c. 1570) was an Italian poet. His verse translation of Ovid's Metamorphoses (the complete version was published in 1561) was often reprinted and has been highly praised by italian critics; a partial translation of Virgil's Aeneid enjoyed less success. Anguillara also wrote the comedy Anfitrione, and the tragedy Edippo, based on Seneca's Oedipus and on Sophocles' Oedipus Rex.

== Biography ==
Giovanni Andrea dell'Anguillara was born in Sutri, in the Papal States, about the year 1517, into an impoverished branch of the provincial nobility. He was educated in Rome, where he found himself drawn away from his studies in law to the literary culture surrounding the Accademia dello Sdegno and the bookshops of Antonio Blado and Antonio Martínez (called "Il Salamanca"). Poverty plagued these early years, even though Anguillara won intermittent support from two powerful cardinals, Alessandro Farnese and Cristoforo Madruzzo. With the failure of his comedy, the Anfitrione, a free adaptation of Plautus' Amphitryon (1548), Anguillara abandoned Rome in search of success elsewhere.

He went first to Parma, then to Venice, then to Paris, where he worked on his translation of Ovid’s Metamorphoses, which is his most esteemed work. The first three books of the translation were published at Paris, and dedicated to Henry II. Anguillara's hopes for French royal patronage evaporated with the death of Henry II, and he (probably) completed his Metamorphoses at Lyon in 1560 with the support of Matteo Balbani of Lucca. He then returned to Italy and sought patronage from Cosimo I de' Medici in Florence, but these efforts also failed and he returned to Venice, where his translation of Ovid was published in 1561. In 1562 he was called upon by the Olympic Academy of Verona to write the preface for the first Italian performance of Gian Giorgio Trissino’s Sofonisba. He then turned his hand to Virgil, completing his translation of the first book of the Aeneid a few years later.

At length he returned to Rome, but, as it would seem, not till towards the close of his life. An habitual gamester, he was reduced before his death to beggary; and having sold his books to save himself from starving, he died in a wretched tavern in one of the meanest quarters of Rome. The time of his death is uncertain. The latest traces of him are found in a letter addressed to him by Annibale Caro, in April 1564, and in his own preface to his tragedy of “Oedipus,” which is dated at Venice in February 1565. It may be worthwhile to mention that there is reason (especially in Giovanni’s description of his own person) for supposing him to have been the same with “II Gobbo” (the hunchback) “dell’Anguillara,” who is set down by Crescimbeni as a different person.

== Works ==
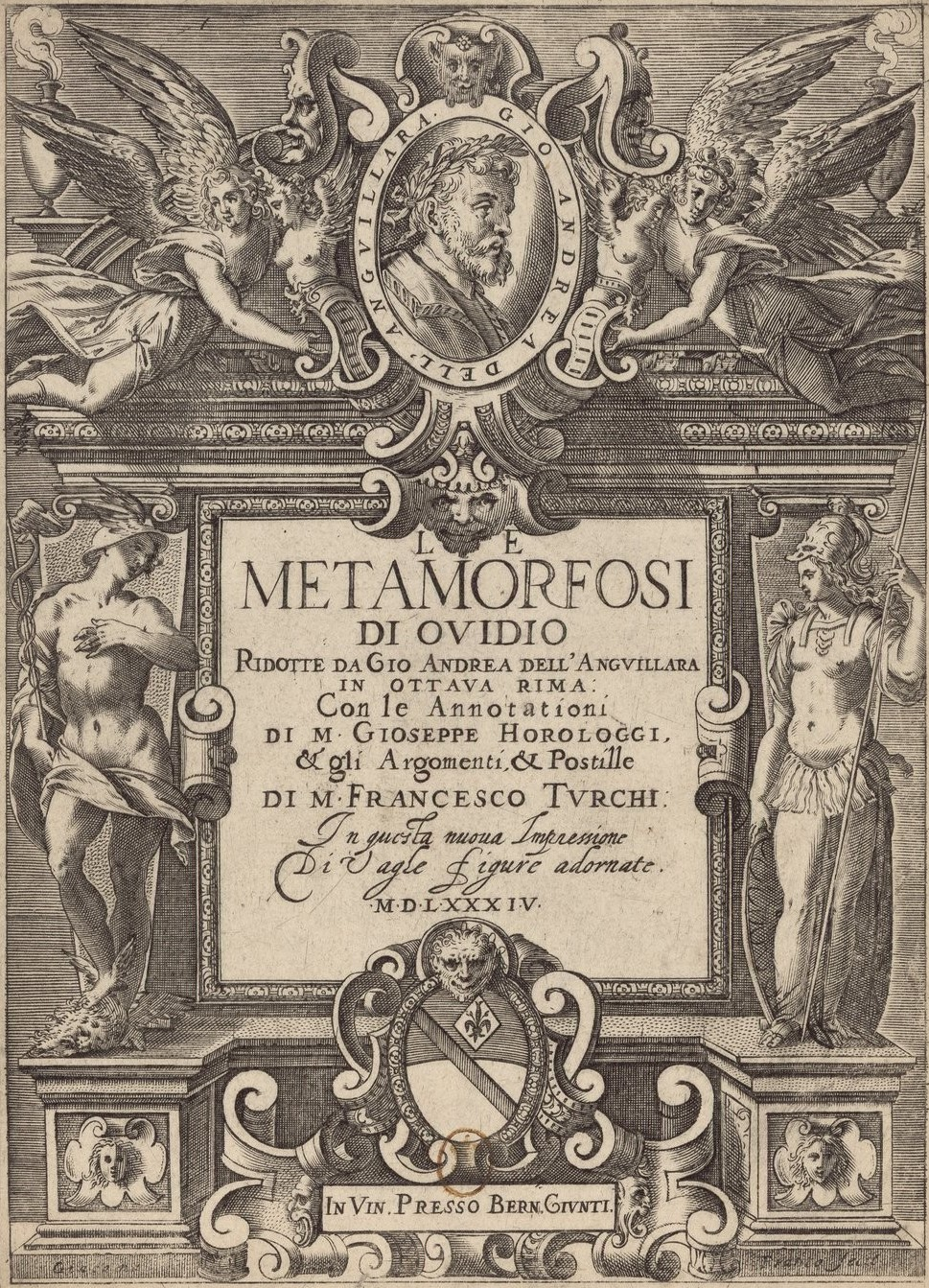
Title page of Giovanni Andrea dell'Anguillara's Italian translation of Ovid's Metamorphoses

Anguillara’s works were the following:

- Le Metamorfosi di Ovidio, ridotte in Ottava Rima. The first three books of the poem appeared at Paris, 1554, 4to., and again at Venice, 1555, 4to. The whole work was first published at Venice in 1561, 4to., and was then dedicated to King Charles IX of France, as the previous part had been to Henry II. Subsequent Venetian editions, belonging to the sixteenth century, all of them having annotations by Giuseppe Orologi, are those of 1563, 4to., 1575, 4to., 1578, 4to., 1579, 8vo., 1581, 4to., with engravings, and those of 1584, 4to., and 1592, 4to., two handsome impressions by the Venetian Giunti, with engravings by Giacomo Franco. Six other editions are enumerated as having appeared in the course of the seventeenth century.
- Il primo Libro dell’Eneide di Virgilio, ridotto in Ottava Rima, Padua, 1564, 4to.; Venice, 1565, 8vo. The remainder was never published.
- Edippo Tragedia, (for this, and not “Edipo,” is the form, which, probably for ease in his versification, Anguillara gives to the Greek name Oedipus), Padua, 1565, 4to., and Venice, 1565, 8vo. The date of 1556, given by Mazzucchelli to the Paduan edition, must be a misprint. The tragedy is inserted in the eighth volume of the Teatro Italiano Antico, Milan, 1809. Anguillara's Edippo was both the first performed and first printed vernacular version of the Oedipus myth in the Renaissance. Considered "one of the most famous Italian tragedies" by Crescimbeni, the Edippo was performed for the first time in Padua on a permanent stage designed by Giovanni Maria Falconetto for the home of Alvise Cornaro and for the second time in Vicenza in 1561 on a temporary wooden stage realized by Andrea Palladio for the purpose.
- Rhymed arguments to the Orlando Furioso of Ariosto, first prefixed to the cantos in the Venetian edition of 1563, and said jocularly by Tasso to have been furnished on contract for half-a-crown each.
- Rime; Italian Poems, lyrical or burlesque. Several of these will be found in various collections. The best known is a familiar poem, in the Bernesque style, which is inserted in the common editions containing the poems of Berni and his imitators. It is entitled, “Capitolo di Messer Giovan’Andrea dell’Anguillara al Cardinale di Trento.”

== Critical assessment ==
The Metamorphoses of Anguillara have received from the Italian critics the highest possible commendations. These writers agree in ranking the work highest among all Italian translations from Ovid; and Crescimbeni puts it on the same level with Annibale Caro’s famous version of the Aeneid. Anguillara's translation is a very free version of Ovid's work. The liberties which the writer takes are so great, and occur so continually, that his work is actually a paraphrase rather than a translation. Thus, the tale of Pyramus and Thisbe, told by the Latin poet in little more than a hundred lines, requires, in the hands of Anguillara, about as many octave stanzas; and this elongation is made, not only by the introduction of much that is original in sentiment and imagery, but by incidents entirely novel. Anguillara's translation was a main source for Abraham Fraunce’s English translation from Ovid’s Metamorphoses in The Third Part of the Countess of Pembrokes Yuychurch, Entituled Amintas Dale (1592). The “Edippo” of Anguillara, which has been sometimes classed among translations, is not a translation either from Sophocles, or from Seneca. Indeed, there are few Italian dramas of the same age which, taking classical stories as their themes, make themselves so boldly independent of classical precedents.

== Bibliography ==
- Spalding, William (1843). "Anguillara, Giovanni Andrea dell'". The Biographical Dictionary of the Society for the Diffusion of Useful Knowledge. Vol. 2. Longman, Brown, Green, and Longmans. pp. 741–742. This article incorporates text from this source, which is in the public domain.
- Crescimbeni, Giovanni Mario (1730). Storia della Volgar Poesia. Vol. 2. Venice: L. Basegio. pp. 433–434.
- Tiraboschi, Girolamo (1792). Storia della Letteratura Italiana. Vol. VII. Modena: presso la Società tipografica. pp. 1288–1291.
- Brambilla, Giuseppe (1863). "Le trasformazioni di Ovidio e i traduttori di esse". Il Politecnico. XVIII: 242–255.
- D'Ovidio, Francesco (1878). "Due tragedie del Cinquecento". Saggi Critici. Naples: 272–311.
- Lozzi, Carlo (1885). "Versione dell'Anguillara dell'Eneide di Virgilio e curioso dono degli esemplari della prima edizione". Il Bibliofilo. VI (7): 102–3.
- Rossi, Vittorio (1891). "Nuovi documenti su Giovanni Andrea dell'Anguillara". Giornale Storico della Letteratura Italiana. XVIII: 435–438.
- Beneducci, Francesco (1899). "Una traduzione bizzarra". Scampoli Critici. Oneglia: 35–41.
- Mancini, Girolamo (1916). "Lettera satirica di Giovanni Andrea dell'Anguillara". Archivio Storico Italiano. LXXIII: 353–364.
- Lorini, Giulio (1935). "Per la biografia di Giovanni Andrea dell'Anguillara". Giornale Storico della Letteratura Italiana. CVI: 81–93.
- Fabrizio, Richard (1995). "The Two Oedipuses: Sophocles, Anguillara, and the Renaissance Treatment of Myth". Modern Language Notes. 110 (1): 178–191. JSTOR 3251136.
- Kallendorf, Craig (1997). "In Search of a Patron: Anguillara's Vernacular Virgil and the Print Culture of Renaissance Italy". The Papers of the Bibliographical Society of America. 91 (3): 294–325. doi:10.1086/pbsa.91.3.24304822. JSTOR 24304822. S2CID 193067456.
- Hartmann, Anna-Maria (2013). "Abraham Fraunce's Use of Giovanni Andrea dell'Anguillara's Metamorfosi". Translation and Literature. 22 (1): 103–110. doi:10.3366/tal.2013.0101. JSTOR 24585301.
- Montanari, Giacomo (2018). "Between Poetry and Painting: Giovanni Andrea dell'Anguillara's Metamorfosi as a Model for Genoese Baroque Poets and Painters". Actual Problems of Theory and History of Art: Collection of Articles. 8. St. Petersburg: St. Petersburg University Press: 162–169. doi:10.18688/aa188-1-15. hdl:11567/945451. ISSN 2312-2129.
- Mutini, Claudio (1961). "ANGUILLARA, Giovanni Andrea dell'". Dizionario Biografico degli Italiani (in Italian). Vol. 3: Ammirato–Arcoleo. Rome: Institute of the Italian Encyclopaedia. OCLC 883370.
