= Remigio Cantagallina =

Italian painter (c. 1582–1656)

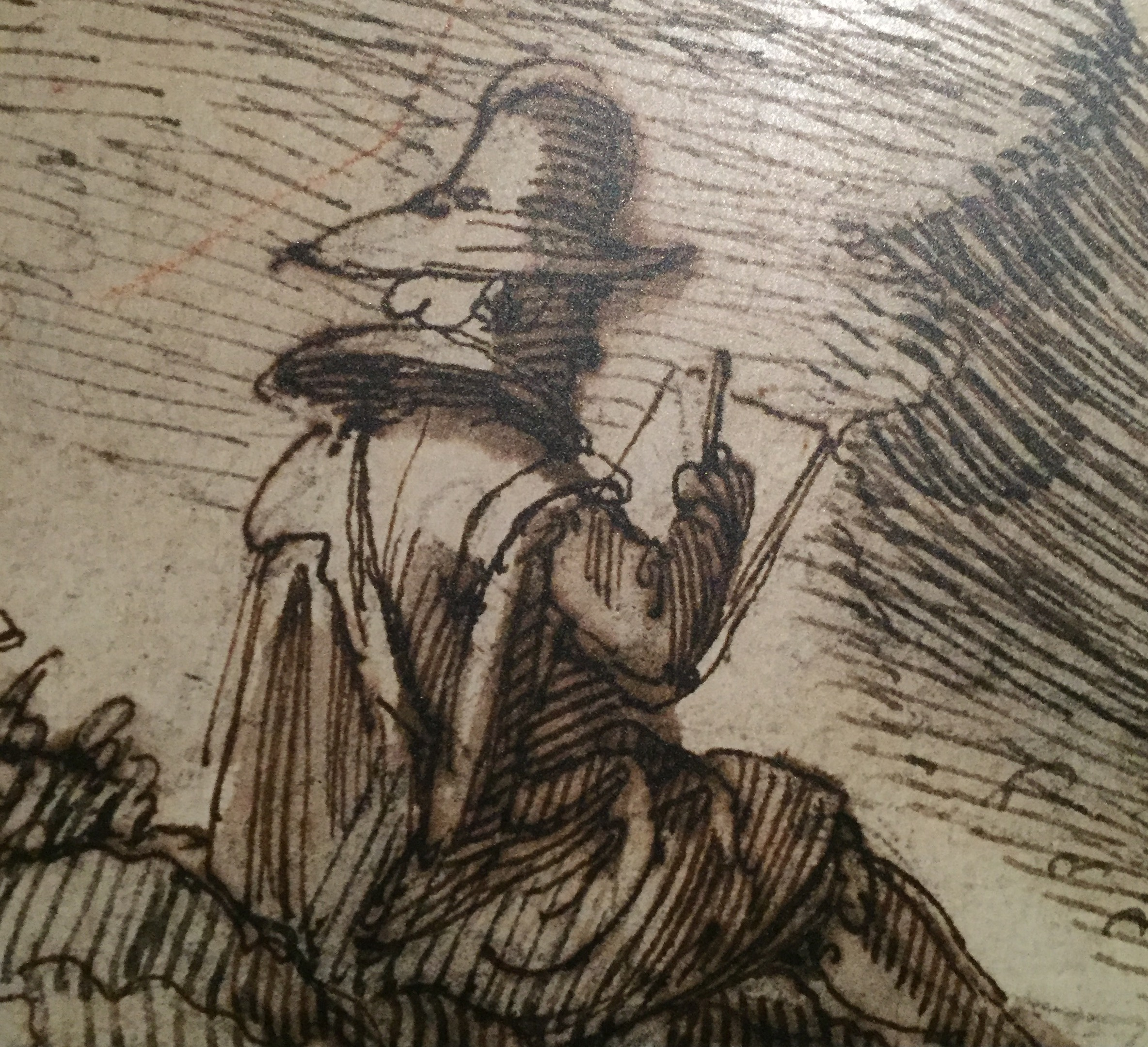
- Remigio Cantagallina at work in 1612 (detail of one of his drawings), Royal Museums of Fine Arts of Belgium, Bruxelles
- Born: c. 1582; Sansepolcro, Grand Duchy of Tuscany
- Died: 1656; Florence, Grand Duchy of Tuscany
- Known for: Engraver
- Movement: Baroque

Remigio Cantagallina (c. 1582 – 1656) was an Italian etcher active in the Baroque period.

== Biography ==
Remigio Cantagallina was born in Sansepolcro, formerly Borgo Santo Sepolcro, in the province of Arezzo. He is best known for his etchings of landscapes and religious subjects, influenced by Paul Bril. He was likely a pupil of the fellow-Florentine Giulio Parigi and Jacopo Ligozzi. In 1612–13 he traveled through the Dutch Republic, the Southern Netherlands, and France, which he documented in detailed drawings in pen and wash of buildings, houses, and cityscapes, complete with persons engaged at work or play in the foreground. His eye caught both the courtly celebrations and the peasant world. He produced detailed views of Brussels and Siena. Jacques Callot was reputed to be a pupil of Cantagallina, before the former moved to Rome to work with Antonio Tempesta. He also likely tutored Stefano della Bella. After 1648, he tutored in drawing the scientist and nature observer Francesco Redi. The engraver Niccolò Angeli was also his pupil.

He painted a Last Supper (1604) for the church of San Bartolomeo (now in Museo Civico) of Sansepolcro; aiding him in this painting was a relative, said to be a brother, Antonio Cantagallina (b. 1616), who distinguished himself as architect in his hometown and Livorno. Another relative, Gianfrancesco (Giovanni Francesco), was also an architect. He died at Florence in 1656.

Among his plates are landscapes, theatrical decorations, and triumphal entries: two landscapes; one with a bridge, the other with buildings; both dated 1603; Immaculate Conception after Callot; A set of four landscapes (1609); A further set of six landscapes; A set of twelve landscapes and an octagon marked with his initials; a set of six landscapes with his cipher (1624); A set of plates of the Scenes of an Opera after Giulio Parigi; and a set of plates, called the Palazzo della Fame (1608).

== Gallery ==
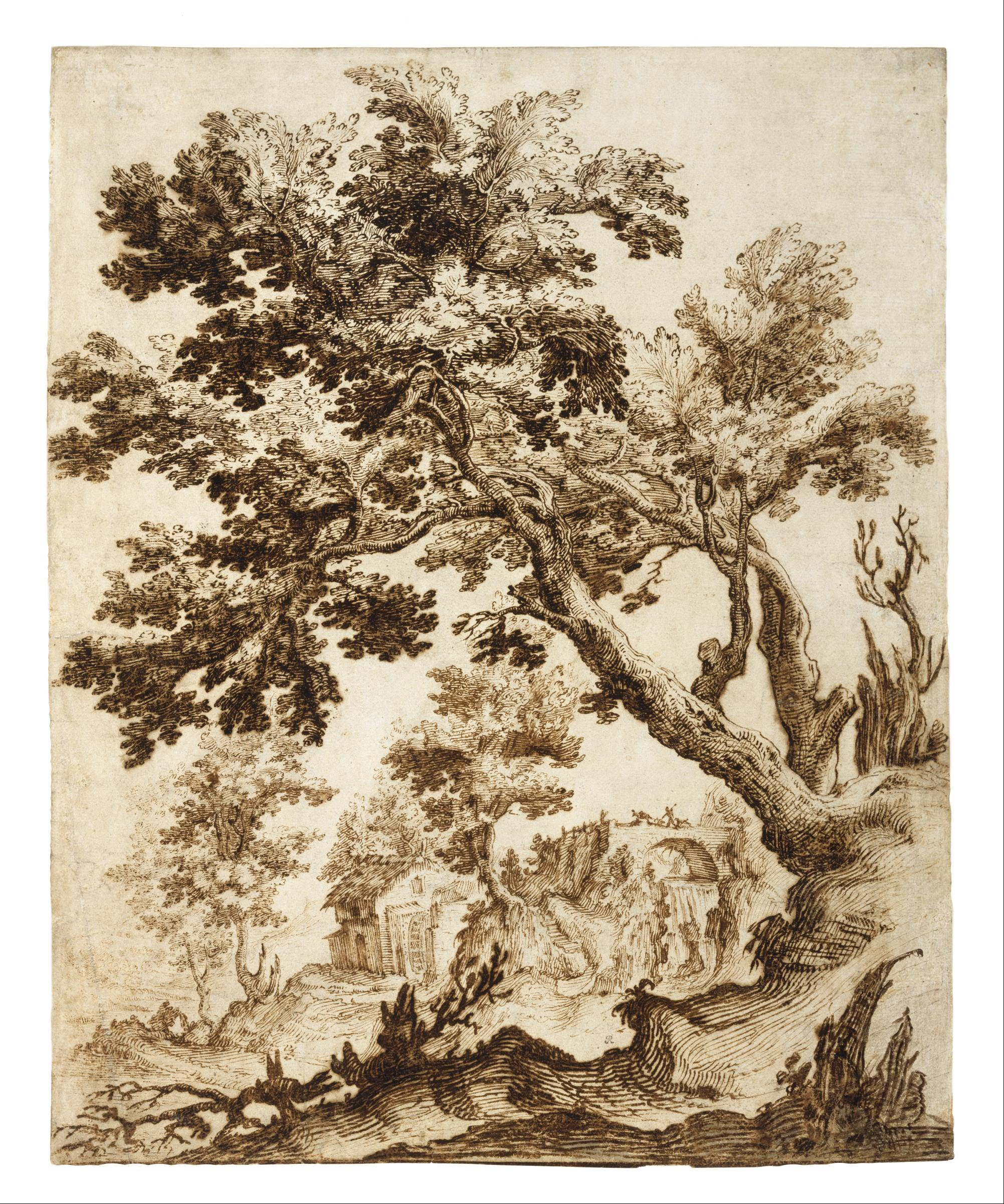
Landscape with Tree and Mill, Museum of Fine Arts, Houston

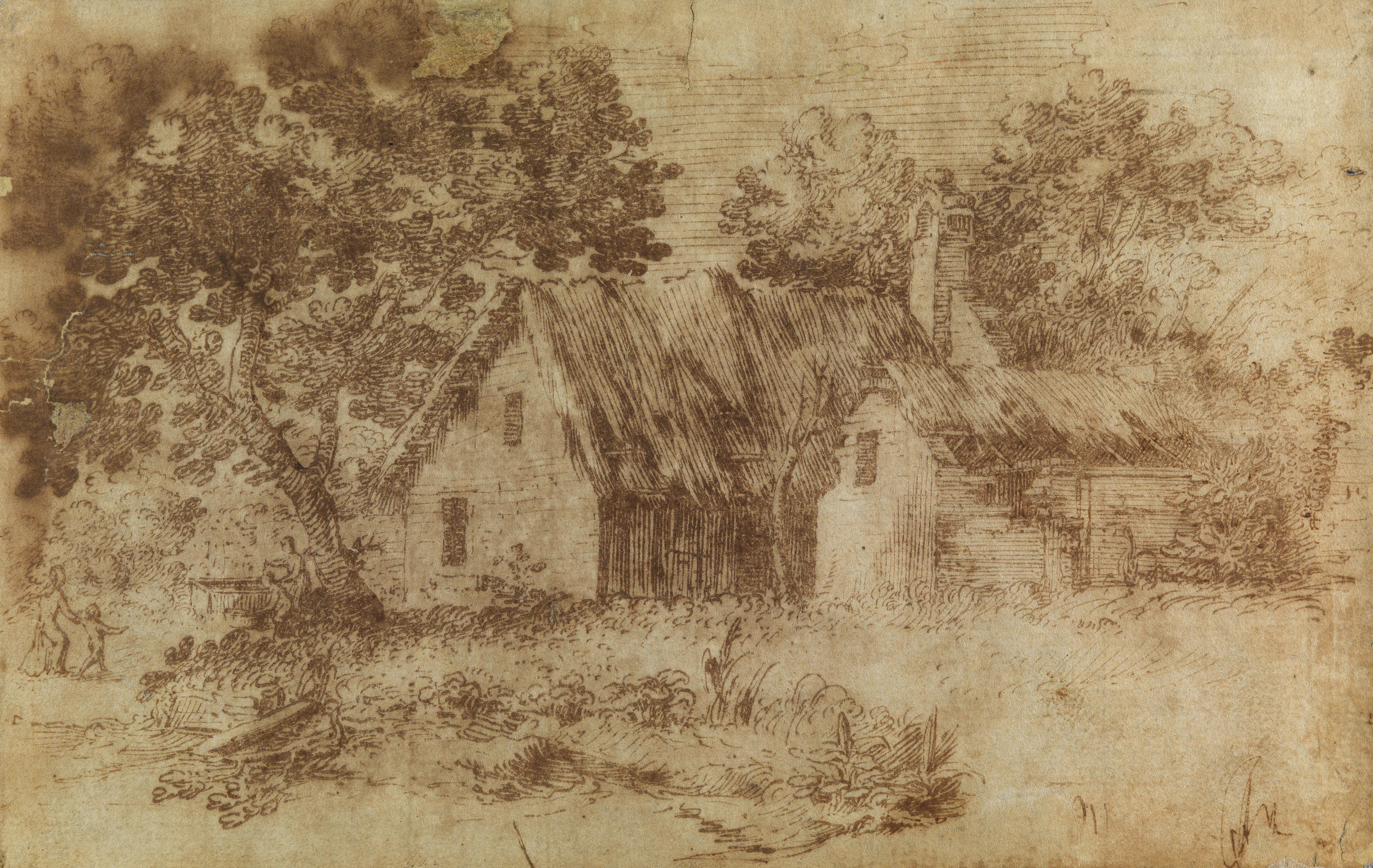
Rural Landscape, National Library of Brazil, Rio de Janeiro

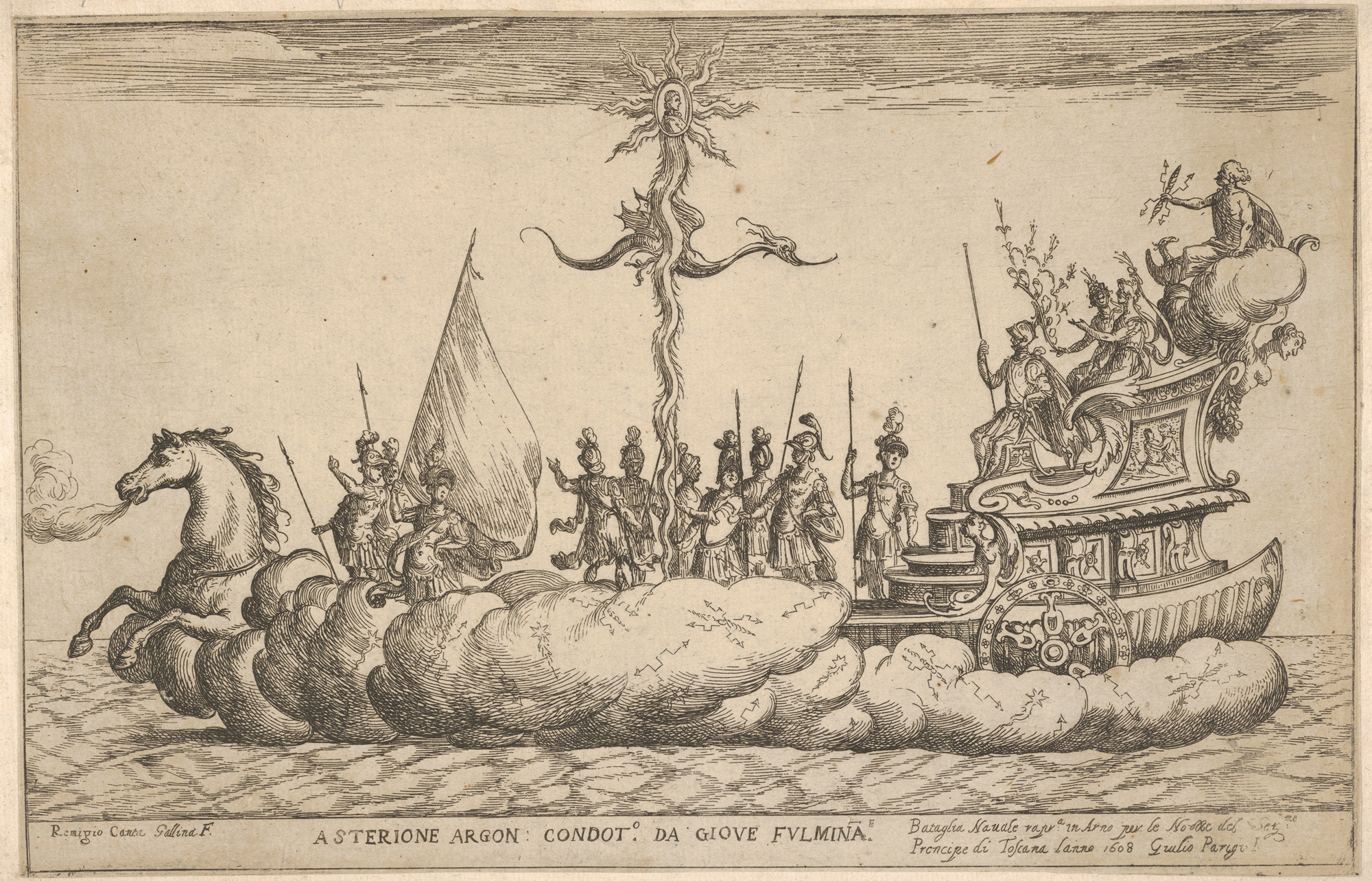
Asterion, from the series 'Vessels of the Argonauts' for the wedding celebration of Cosimo de' Medici in Florence, Metropolitan Museum of Art, New York

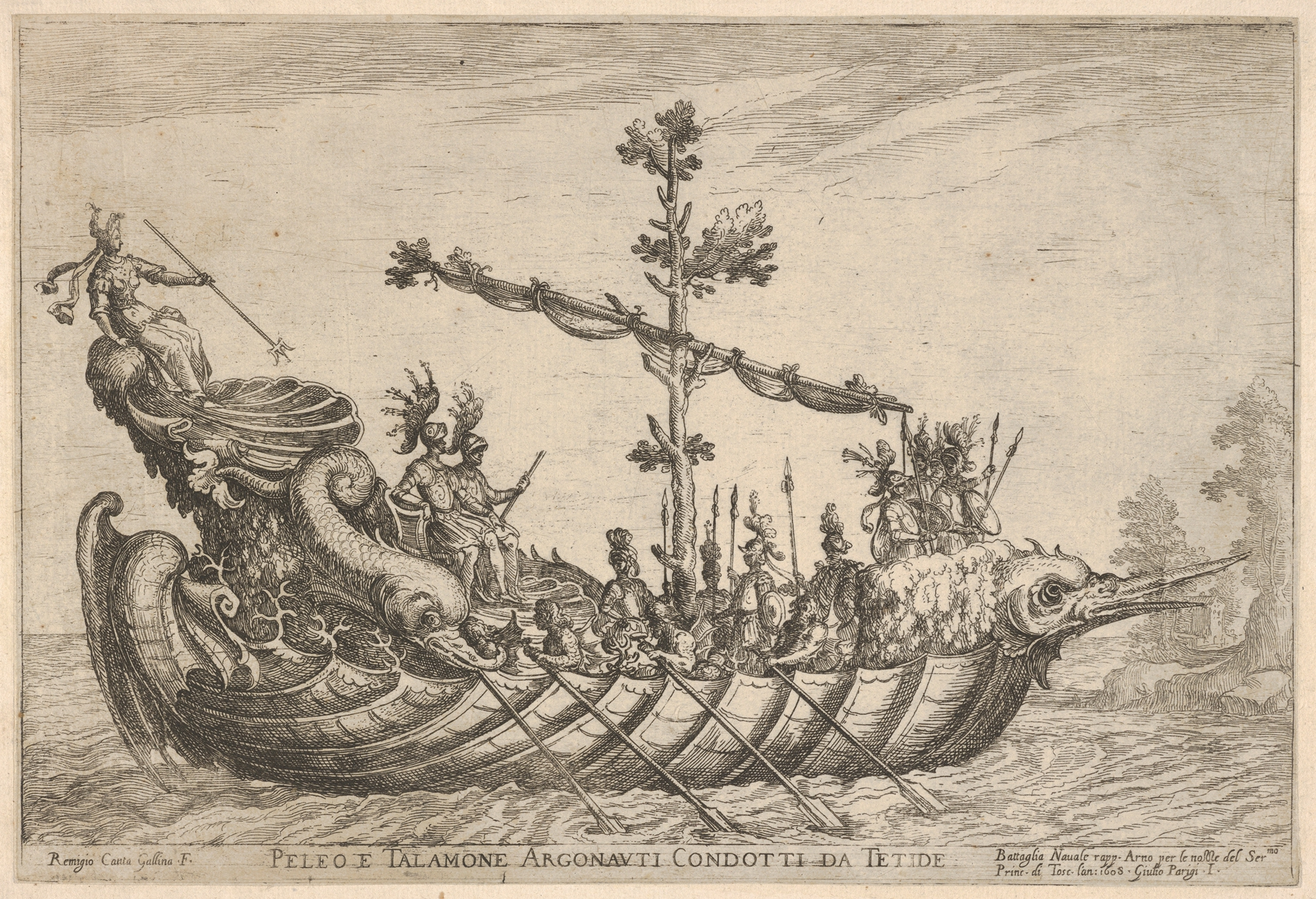
Peleus and Talamon, from the series 'Vessels of the Argonauts,' for the wedding celebration of Cosimo de' Medici in Florence, Metropolitan Museum of Art, New York

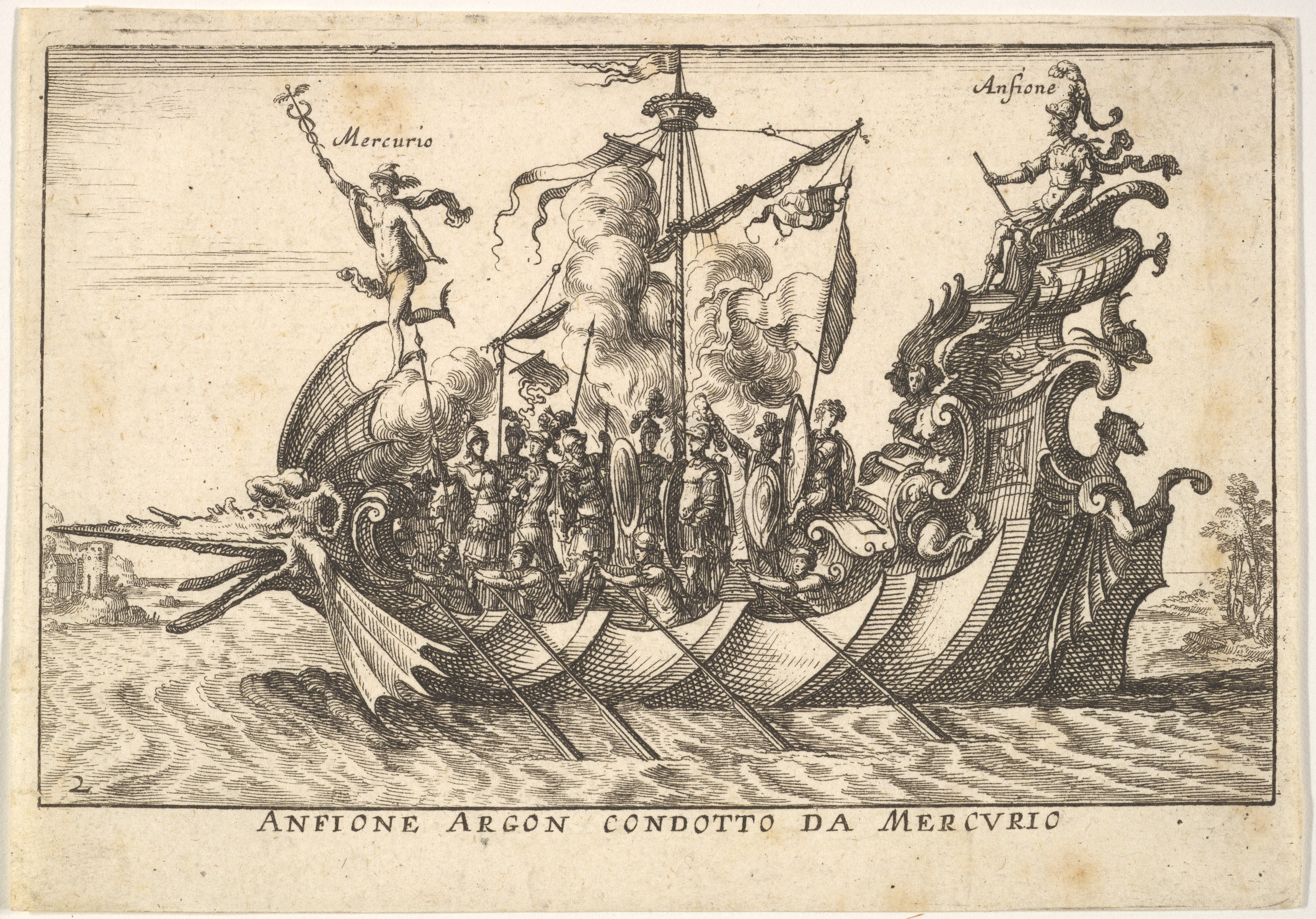
The Argonaut Amphion, from the series 'Vessels of the Argonauts' for the wedding celebration of Cosimo de' Medici in Florence, Metropolitan Museum of Art, New York

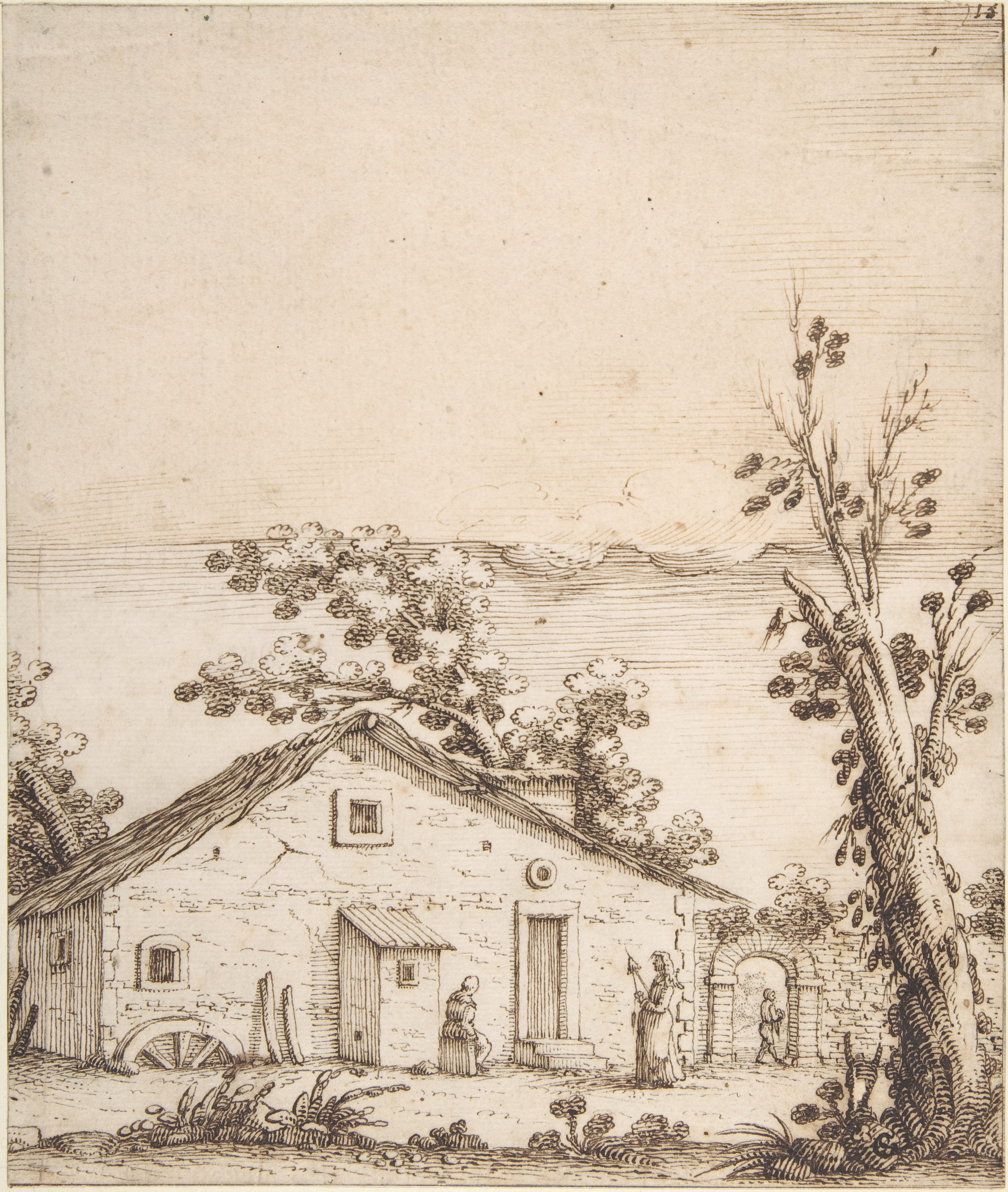
Three Figures by a Rustic Dwelling, Metropolitan Museum of Art, New York

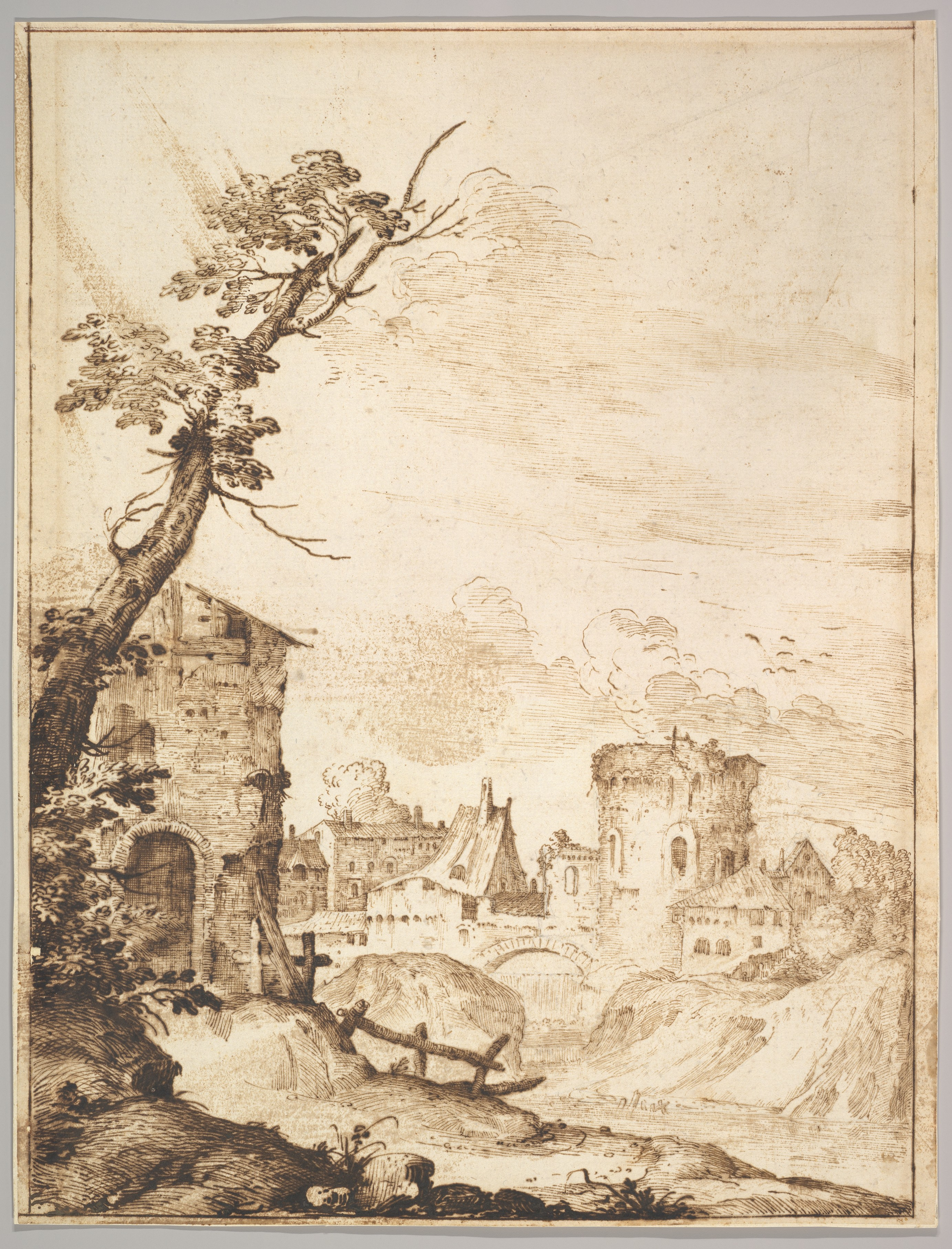
View of a Town with a Tower, Metropolitan Museum of Art, New York

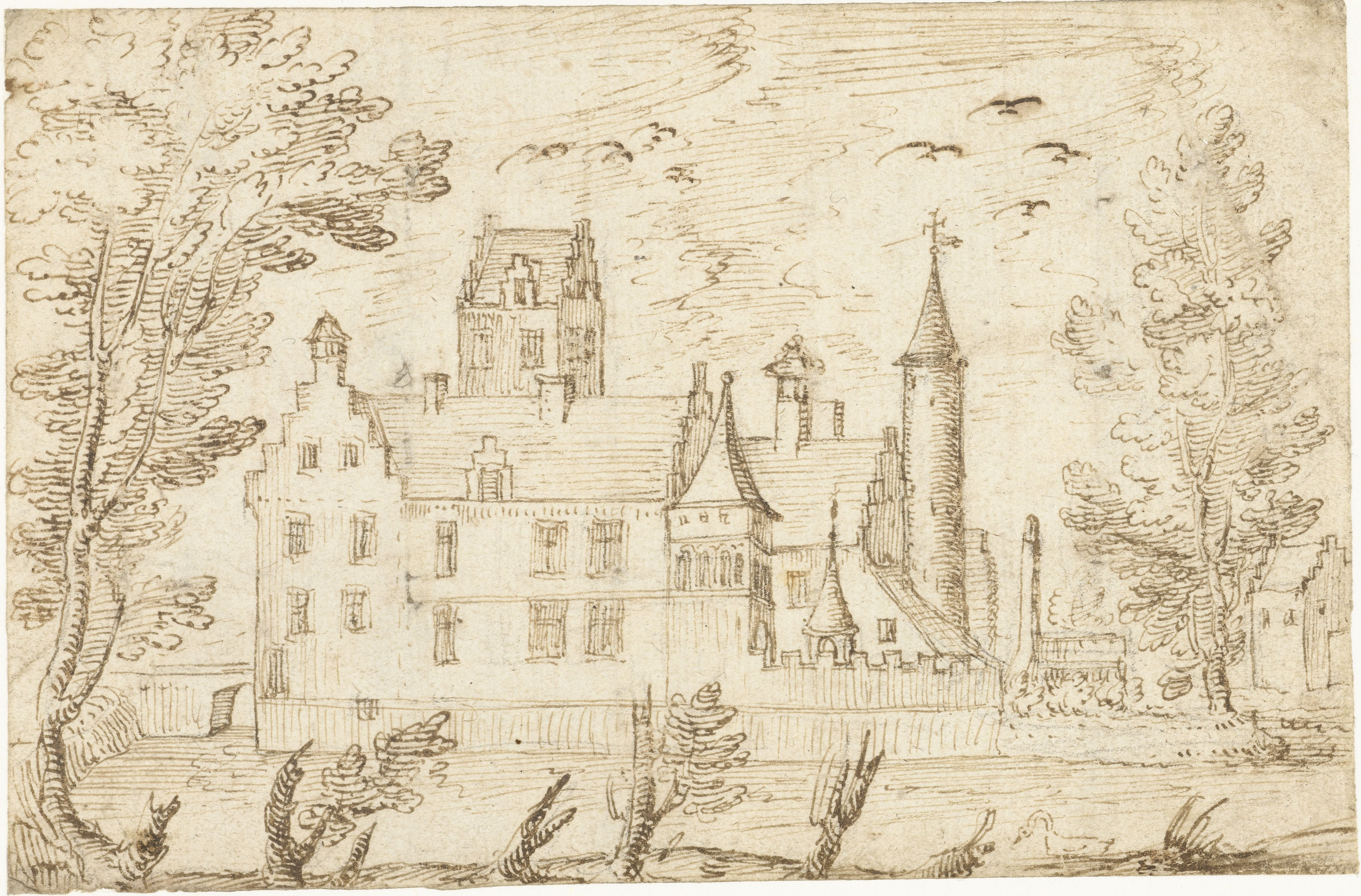
Castle with moat, Rijksmuseum, Amsterdam

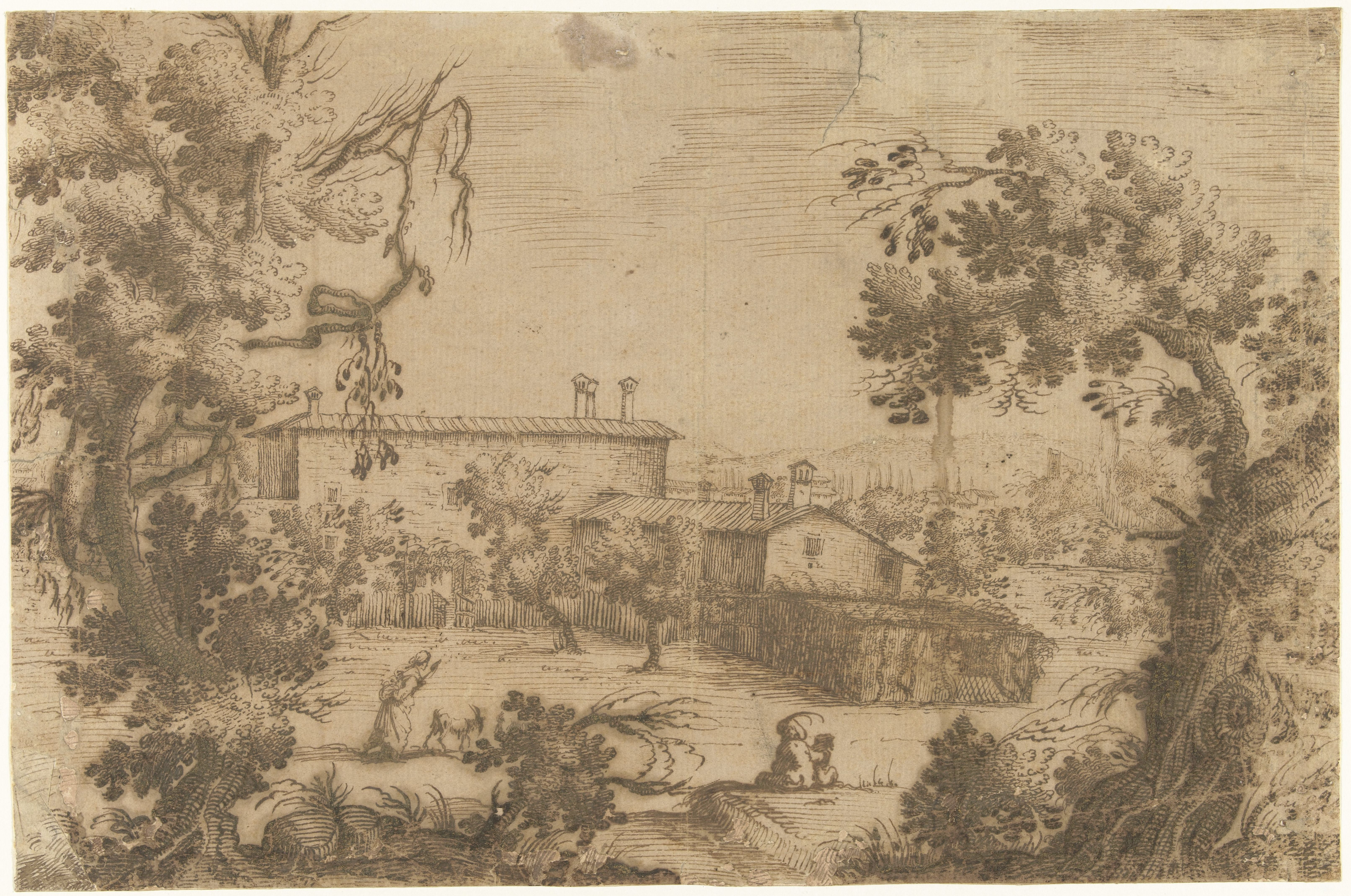
View of a Tuscan village, Rijksmuseum, Amsterdam

== Bibliography ==
- Bryan, Michael (1886). Robert Edmund Graves (ed.). Dictionary of Painters and Engravers, Biographical and Critical. Vol. I: A-K. London: George Bell and Sons. p. 226.
- Artnet biography from Grove encyclopedia or Art.
- Short Bibliography
