= Fortifications of ancient Smyrna =

Ancient fortifications

Location of Smyrna in Ionia

Smyrna (modern day Izmir in the Republic of Turkey) was a port city on the Western coast of Ionia (Anatolia) that has been inhabited since antiquity, as far back as the 3rd millennium BCE. The city was once heavily fortified, and those fortifications were tested frequently during their existence and went through several iterations before the city was eventually moved to another location.

== History ==
The first known habitation in the area was at what is now Bayraklı, several kilometers north of Izmir's city center. This site was home to the named city of Smyrna from the Iron Age to the late Archaic/early Classical period (likely in the late 4th Century BCE). The dating of the sites are based on sherds of pottery from the protogeometric and protocorinthian periods, respectively. The fortifications were heavily damaged or destroyed by a powerful earthquake around 700 BCE, and more built on top of the ruins. Around 600 BCE, the city was assaulted by King Attyes of Lydia and Wall 3 destroyed during the battle, and the city taken. Only a short time later, the Persian Empire struck and sacked the city in 545 BCE. It appears that the main city was moved into what is now Izmir during the Hellenistic period as the Bayraklı location was abandoned in the late 4th Century and the primary area of habitation moved south to what is now Izmir, under which the post-Archaic Smyrna now lies.

=== Wall Phases ===
Wall 1: ca. 850-800 BCE

Wall 2: ca. 775-725 BCE

Wall 3: ca. late 7th Century

Wall 4: ca. 4th Century BCE

== Description ==
The primary fortifications are found at the Bayraklı site, and consist of four phases of ring wall (the wall around the city), a mudbrick building, gates, and towers, dated to the mid 9th century to mid 4th century BCE. The walls are quite thick, with Wall 1 (ca. 950 BCE) being 4.75m thick at the base and Wall 2 (ca. 750 BCE) 9m thick. Wall 3 (late 7th Century) was 15m thick and the foundation in some remaining places is 5m high, but the height of the rest of the wall or the other phases of wall cannot be determined. Wall 4 (4th Century) was apparently much smaller than the rest, at 1.5m thick and served less as a fortification and more as a terrace wall.

The fortifications of Smyrna were notable beginning in the 9th century due to the enormous monumental gate, built with gray and white stone. No reliable public images of the fortification site are readily apparent, nor are any descriptions of potential details or artwork on the structures. However, as much of the structures were mudbrick as opposed to the longer-lasting stone, they were not preserved.

== Function ==
While the function may seem obvious to a modern observer (fortifications are usually for defensive purposes), at the time these fortifications were constructed they were relatively rare. Most walls were not built to defend against protracted sieges, like "modern" walls (such as Medieval castles) but instead to simply keep out bandits and keep in the animals. Such massive fortifications as seen at Smyrna were rare, and the sheer size of the walls (15 meters thick is extremely large) and the presence of bastions by one of the gates in the second phase of fortifications shows that these were more than just for show. As most armies at the time were not professional standing armies, the existence of such substantial fortifications demonstrates that the rulers of Smyrna expected a fight, and spent their resources in anticipation of that fight.
