= Kadifekale =

Castle in İzmir, Turkey

- İzmir in Turkey
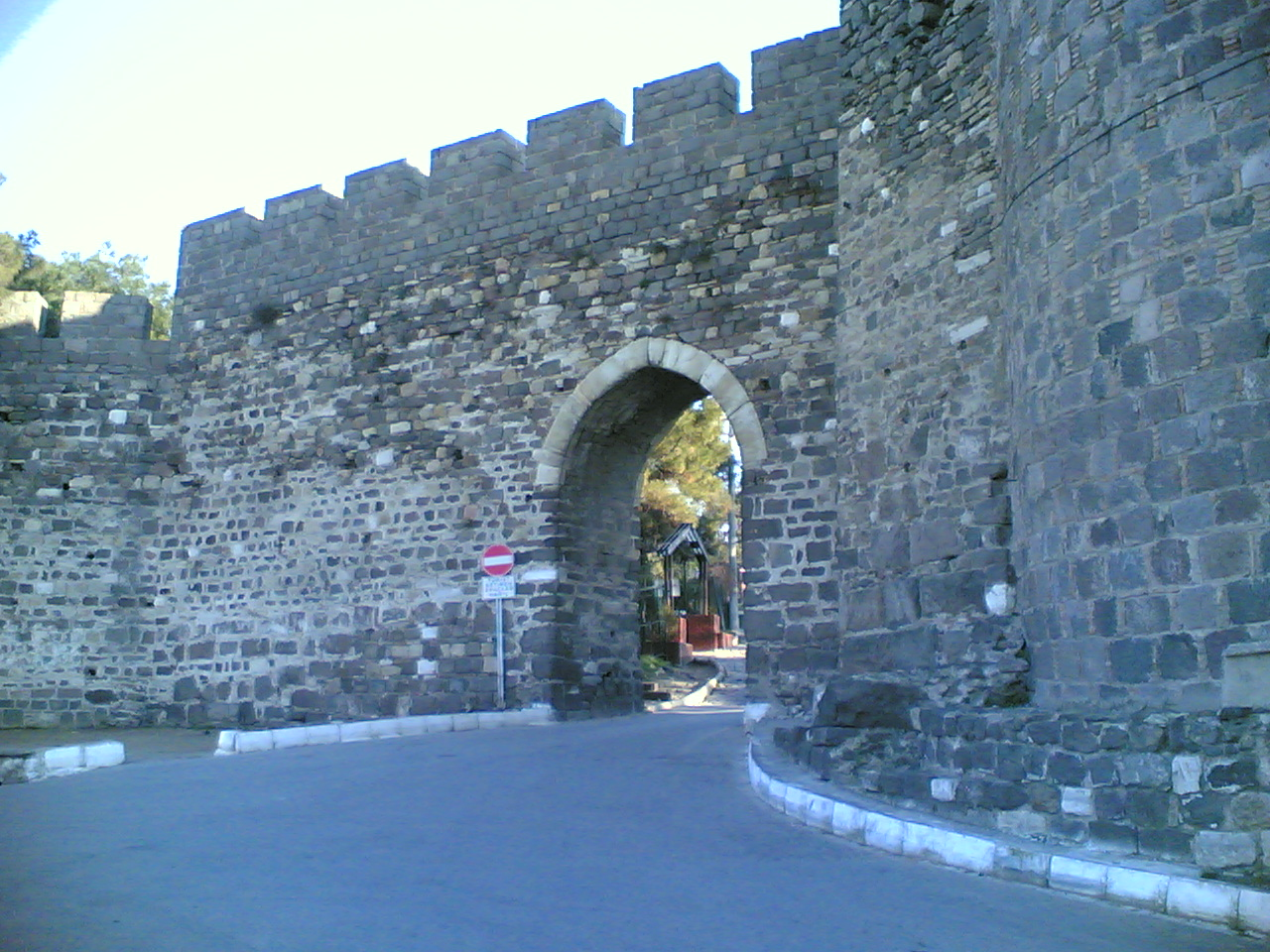
- Entry of the castle walls in Kadifekale

Site information
- Type: Hilltop castle
- Open to the public: Yes

Location
- Coordinates: 38°24′50″N 27°08′45″E
- Height: 35 metres (115 ft)

Site history
- Built: 3rd century BC
- Materials: Stone

Kadifekale (literally "the velvet castle" in Turkish) is a hilltop castle in İzmir, Turkey. The castle is located on the Mount Pagos (Greek: Πάγος, Pagus under the Roman Empire) which has an elevation of 186 metres. It was built in the 3rd century BC. The castle is located at a distance of about 2 km from the shoreline and commands a general view of a large part of the city of İzmir, as well as of the Gulf of İzmir.

In 2007, the metropolitan municipality of İzmir started renovation and restoration works in Kadifekale. In 2020, Kadifekale became a Tentative World Heritage Site as part of "The Historical Port City of Izmir."

== Re-foundation of Smyrna on Mount Pagos ==
The first recorded defensive walls built here was the work of Lysimachos, a "successor" (diadochus) of Alexander the Great, later a king (306 BC) in Thrace and Asia Minor. This construction was associated with Alexander's re-foundation of Smyrna, moving it from Old Smyrna on a mound in the southeastern corner of the inner gulf where only a few thousand people could be accommodated. This move for the location of a new and larger city gained fame in a legend told by Pausanias, according to which Alexander, during a rest after hunting under a plane tree near the sanctuary on the hill of the two Nemeseis worshipped by the Smyrneans, was approached during his sleep by the goddesses who bade him found a city on that very spot, transferring to it the inhabitants of the earlier site. Upon this, the famous oracle in Klaros was consulted and the answer received was;

Three and four times happy shall those men be hereafter, who shall dwell on Pagus beyond the sacred Meles.

While Alexander could only act as inspirator and/or initiator for the move, the recent excavations in Old Smyrna have shown that the settlement there could have ceased even during his lifetime. The legend, in the meantime, was frequently depicted on ancient coins.

== Tale of Two Cities ==
Strabo records that only a small part of Smyrna was located on the mound, with the greater part centered around the harbor on the flatlands below. The stadium and the theatre on the other hand, were on the slopes immediately below the summit. The settlements on the hill and those near the coast had a separate history in certain periods, as it was the case during the 14th century, when the hill castle was captured by the Aydinids, and the port city, with another castle, was held by the Genoese until its capture by Tamerlane in 1403. During the 19th century, Kadifekale was part of the chain across several slopes which constituted İzmir's Turkish core, while the urban center below was the cosmopolitan part.

The present walls are medieval. A number of sources put forth claims on having observed fragments of Hellenic masonry under the existing walls, but these fell short of having acquired general acceptance. The long hollow west of the castle marks the site of the Stadium, scene of the martyrdom of St. Polycarp, and it is now completely built over. This is also the case for the ancient theatre of Smyrna, which is located to the east of the castle gates, although there a few traces are still visible to the naked eye. Both works belong to a reconstruction following a calamitous earthquake in 178.

Next to the castle are the ruins of the cisterns built during the Roman period and renovated during the Byzantine and Ottoman periods. They formed the centre of the drinking water network of Smyrna. The remains of this network are still preserved in the agora of Smyrna in downtown İzmir.

== Cultural activity ==
In 2015 the Barış Youth Symphony Orchestra was founded incorporating children with limited opportunities with the purpose to keep them away from crime on the street existing in the neighborhood. The orchestra, grown up to nearly one hundred members coming also from other neighbors of the city, gives concerts accompanied by notable classic music artists.

== Gallery ==
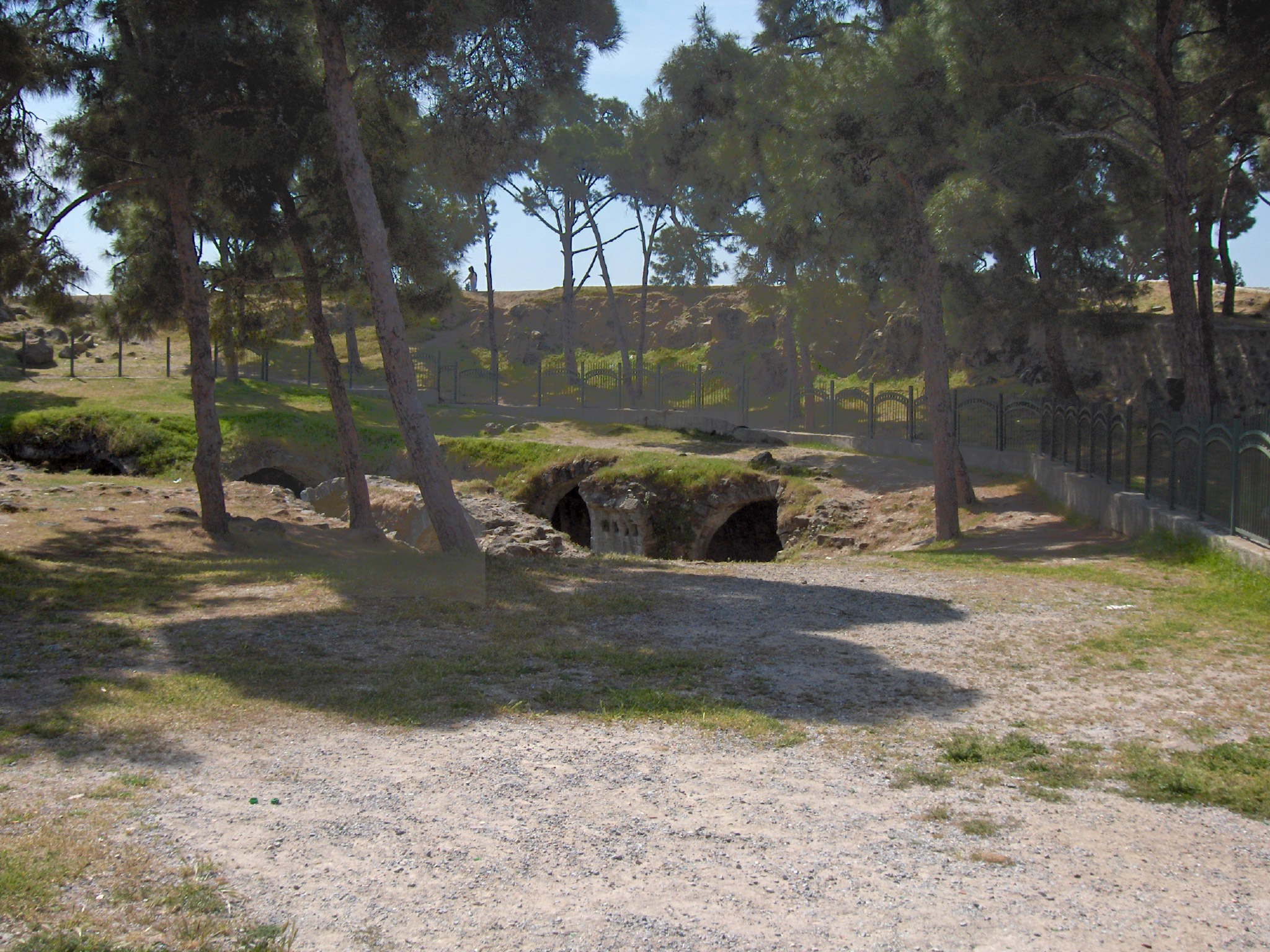
Cisterns

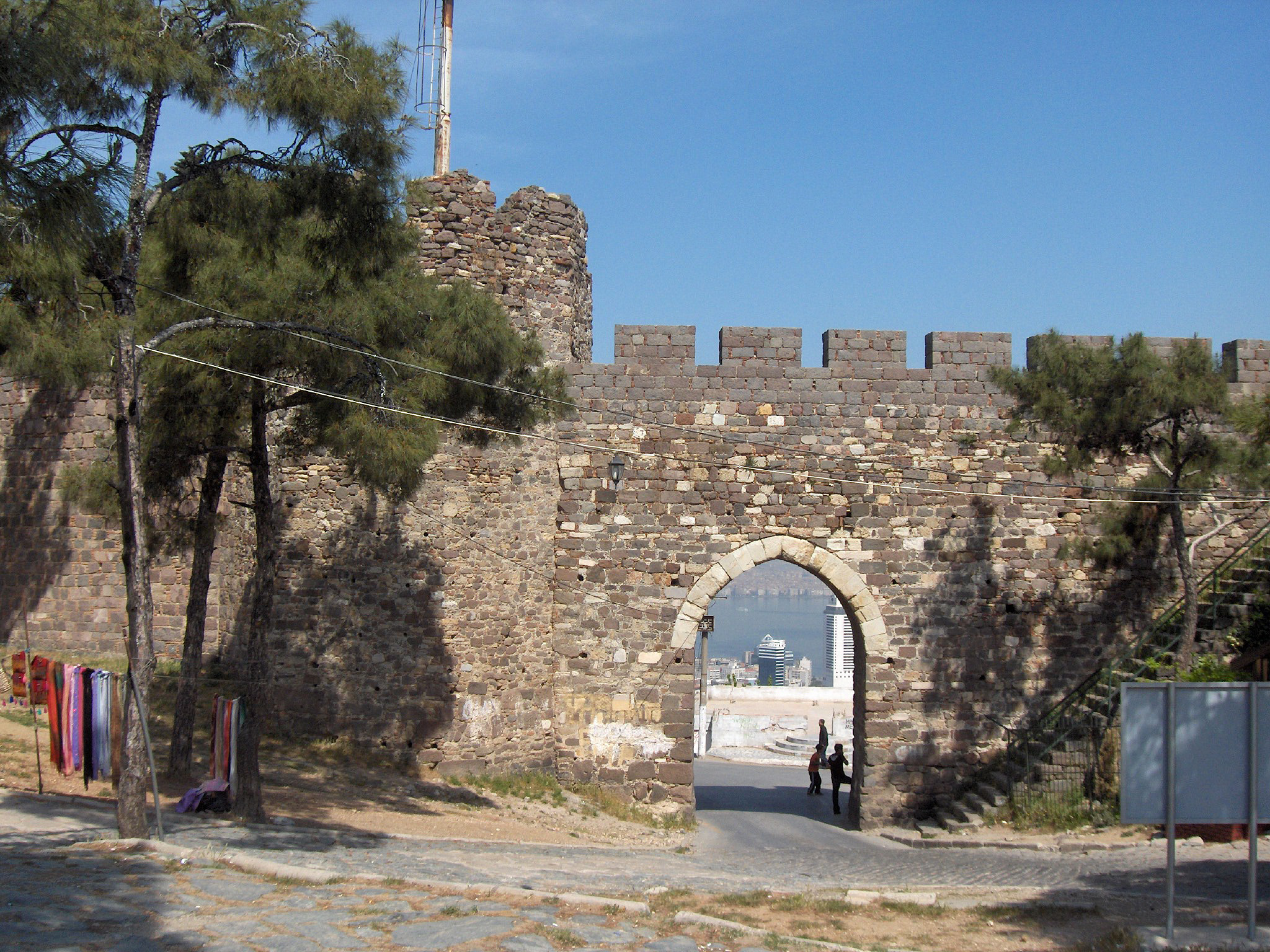
Castle gate

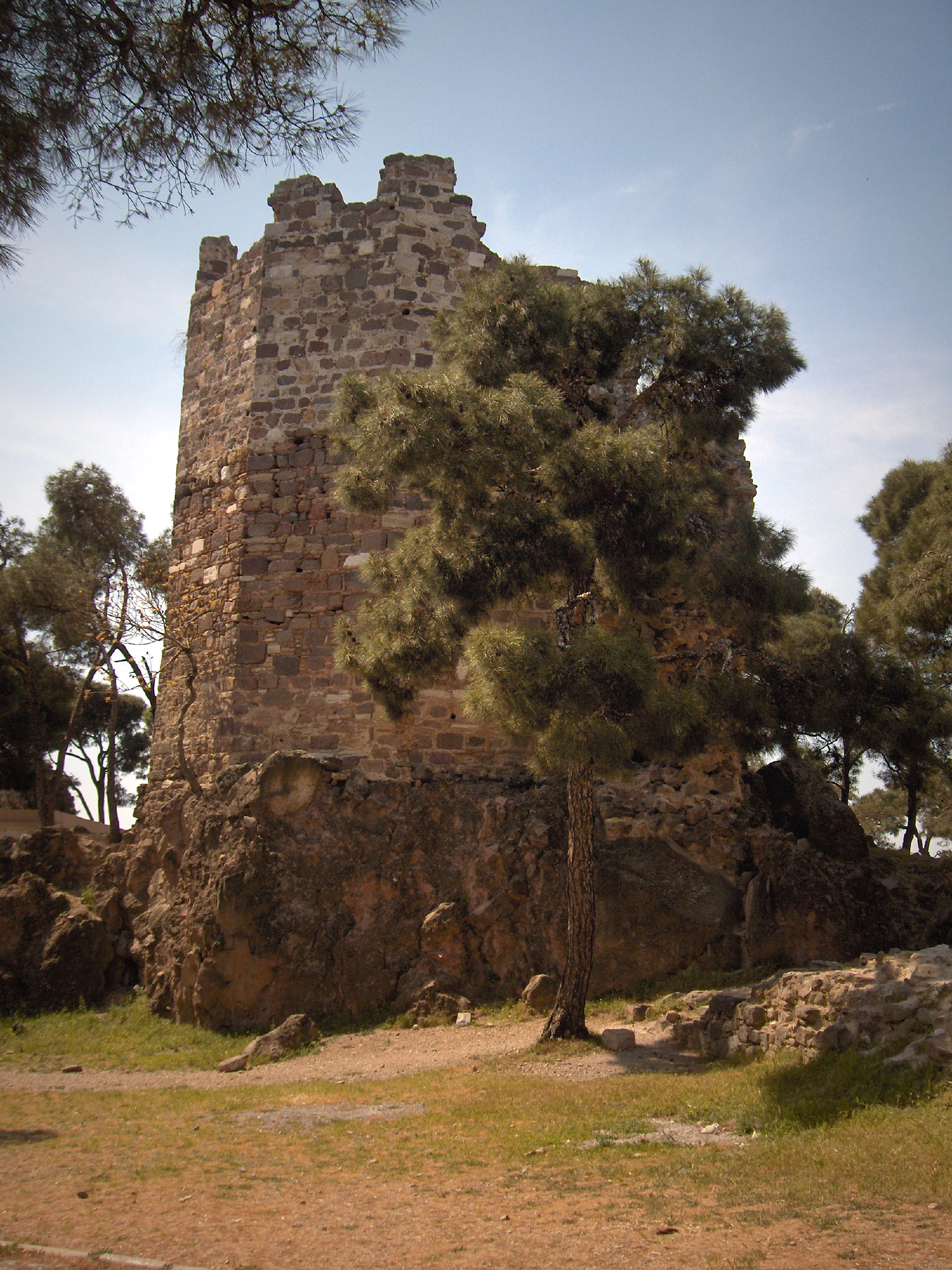
Watch tower

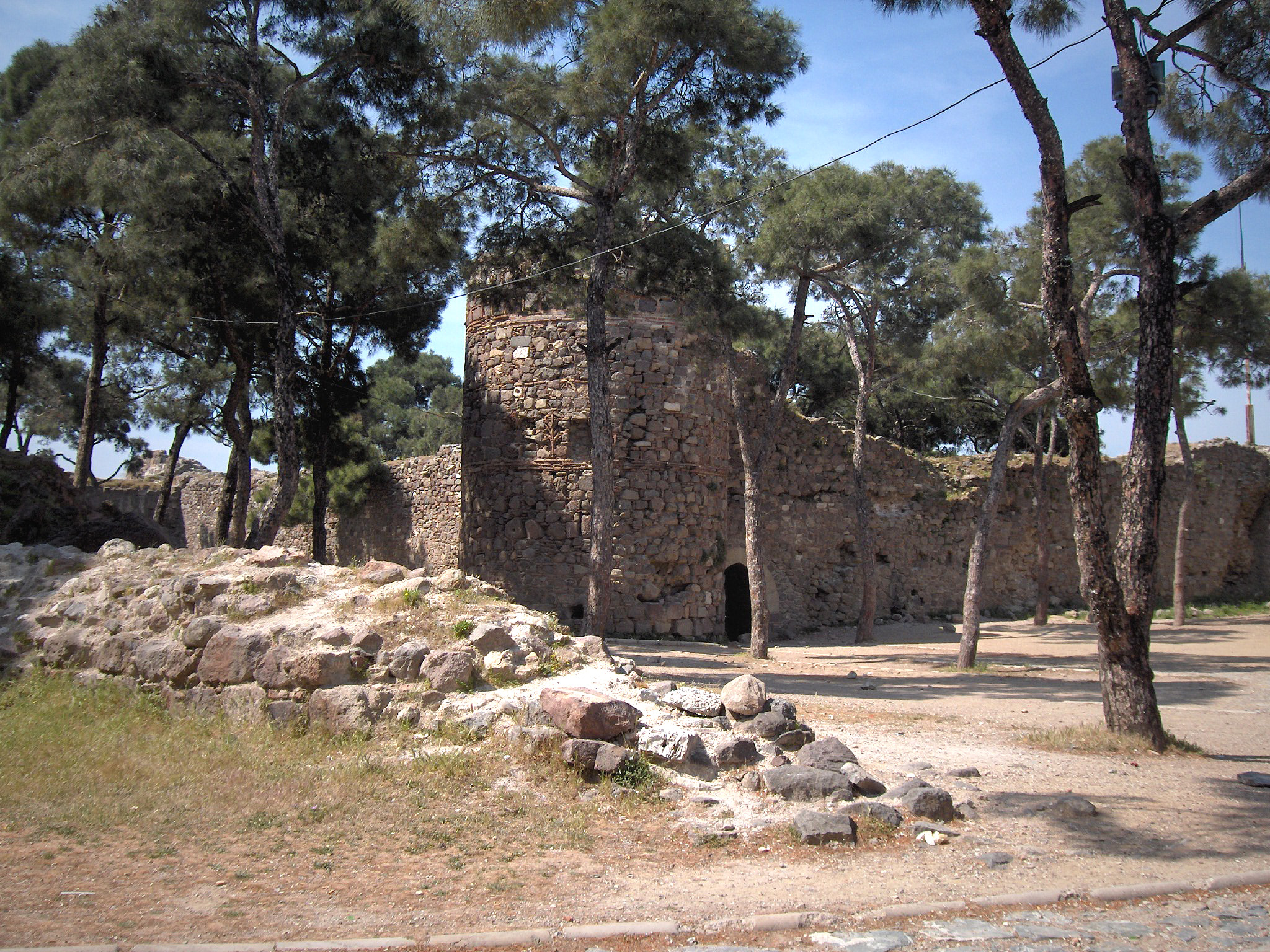
Castle wall

== Books ==
- Akurgal, Ekrem (2002). Ancient Civilizations and Ruins of Turkey: From Prehistoric Times Until the End of the Roman Empire. Kegan Paul. ISBN 0-7103-0776-4.
- Bean, George E. (1967). Aegean Turkey: An Archaeological Guide. London: Ernest Benn. ISBN 978-0-510-03200-5.
- Cadoux, Cecil John (1938). Ancient Smyrna: A History of the City from the Earliest Times to 324 A.D. Blackwell Publishing.
