= Yeşilova Höyük =

Archaeological site in Turkey

Yesilova Hoyuk
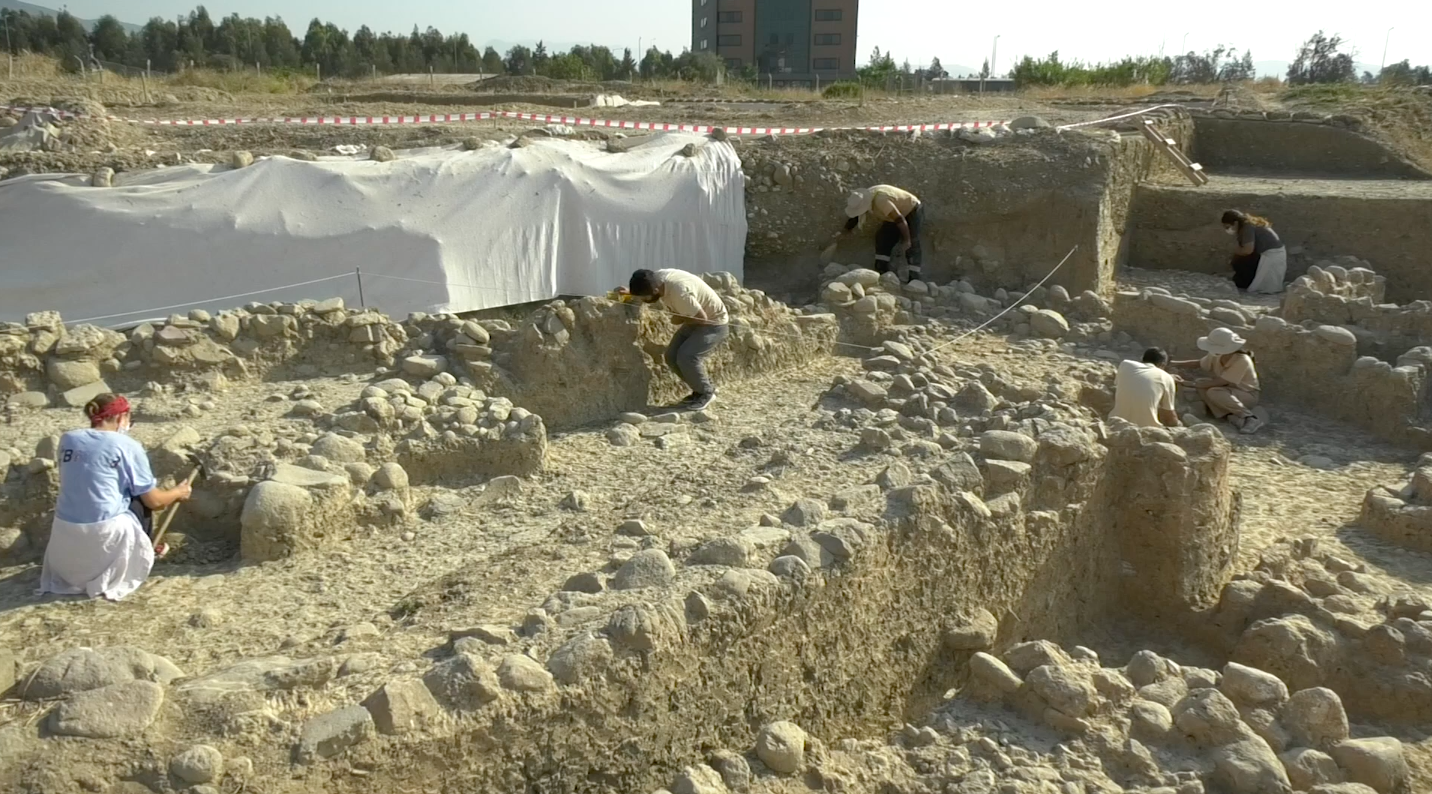
- The site in 2020
- Interactive map of Yesilova Hoyuk
- 38.4414°N 27.2139°E
- Type: Settlement
- Location: Bornova, Izmir, Turkey

History
- Built: c. 6500 BC
- Abandoned: c. 4000 BC

Site notes
- Discovered: 2003 by Ali Ozkan

Yeşilova Höyük is a höyük (tell) in the Bornova district of İzmir, Turkey, and is the oldest known prehistoric human settlement in the area of İzmir. It was occupied continuously from roughly 6500 to 4000 BC, and was covered with silt afterwards.

Discovered in 2003, the site has been explored since 2005 by a team under the direction of Associate Professor Zafer Derin of Ege University. By 2005, important new light had been shed on the Neolithic-Chalcolithic phases of İzmir's metropolitan area in particular and of Turkey's Aegean Region in general.

A drilled sample section disclosed a first cultural layer associated with the late Roman–early Byzantine period, and still more importantly, allowed the outlines of two additional layers, which date from the Calcolithic and Neolithic Ages, to be made out. The first settlement in the site, at a depth of 4 meters under the surface level, had started during the Neolithic and reached its zenith towards the end of the same age, and then continued through the Chalcolithic period. Thus, Yeşilova Höyük saw uninterrupted settlement spanning at least fifteen hundred years of prehistory. No artifacts dating from the early Bronze Age are discovered to date but after the full abandonment of the settlement, part of the mound was used as a cemetery. Habitation in the area of the mound was resumed during the late Roman-early Byzantine period, but was sparser in form and shorter in duration.

In June 2010, the Municipality of Bornova district in İzmir organised a national architectural competition for a visitor center within the excavation site. The competition was won by architects Evren Başbuğ (Studio Evren Başbuğ Architects), and Umut Başbuğ.
