= Myus =

Ancient Greek human settlement

- Μυοῦς, Μύης, Μυήσιοι, Μυήσσιοι (Ancient Greek)
- Myous, Myos
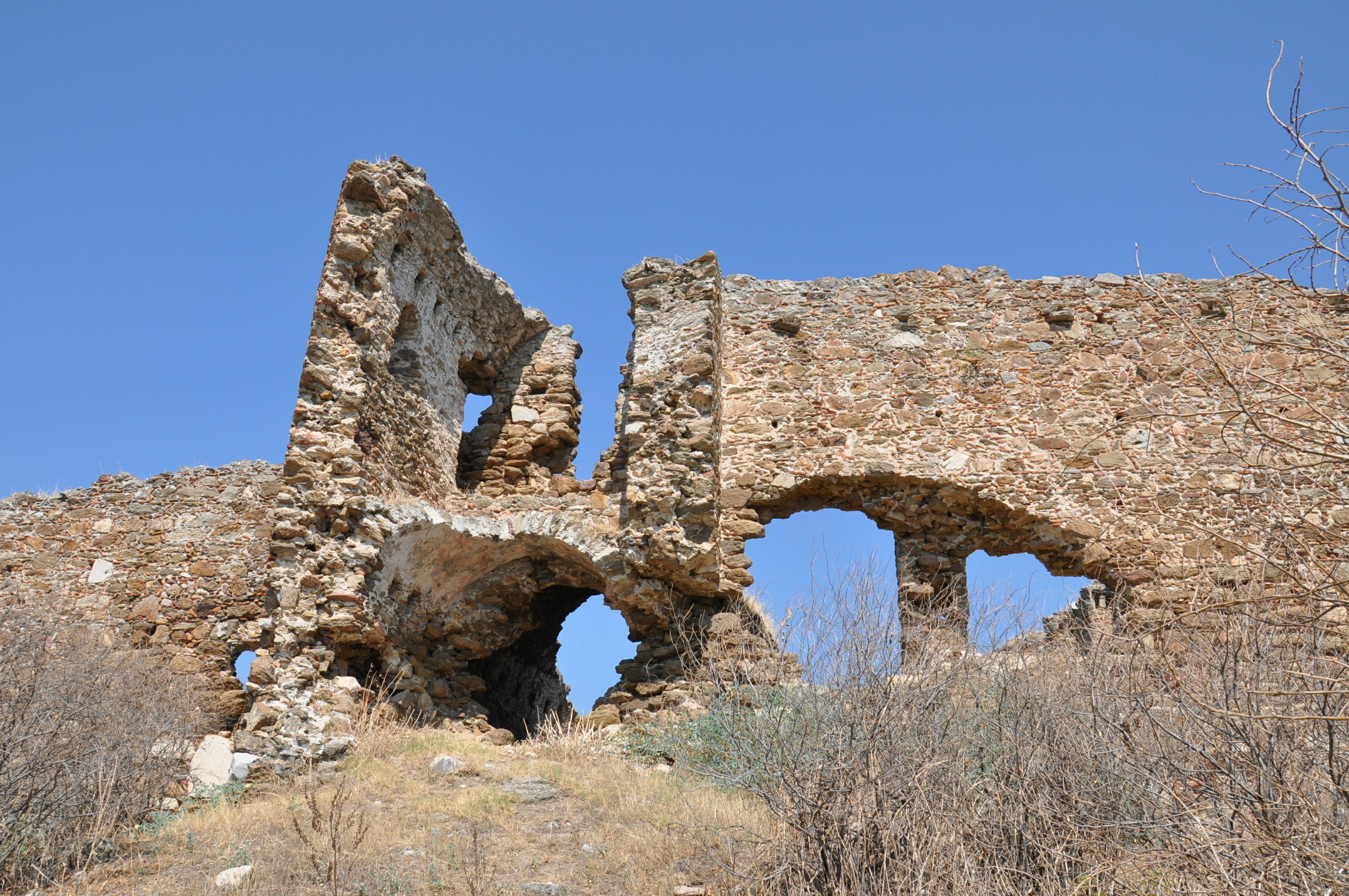
- Byzantine fortess at the former location of Myus. The ancient Greek polis had been gone for many centuries when this fort was built.

- Location within Turkey
- 37°35′44″N 27°25′46″E
- Type: Polis
- Location: Avşar, Aydın Province, Turkey
- Region: ancient Caria
- Part of: Ionian League

Myus (Ancient Greek: Μυοῦς), sometimes Myous or Myos, or Myes, was an ancient Greek city in Caria. It was one of thirteen major settlements of the Ionian League, and was one of three that spoke the same Ionic subdialect, the other two being Miletus and Priene. All three were Ionian colonies placed at the mouth of the Maeander River in the middle of the west coast of Anatolia.

Miletus was more ancient than the Ionians, having been occupied by various ethnic groups since the Neolithic. It was partly Hellenized in the Late Bronze Age by Achaeans, who are termed Mycenaeans in scholarly language. The previous inhabitants at that time were Anatolian language speakers, ancestors of the Carians. The Ionians secured it along with its multi-cultural population during the Submycenaean period between the Bronze Age and the Dark Age. If the re-colonization is the remote start of the Ionian League, Myus and Priene must have been in existence then, although there is no evidence that they were pre-Ionian.

Miletus appears in Homer; Myus does not. Perhaps it was after the heroic age. It does appear in the earliest known historian, Hecataeus of Miletus (550-476 BC), whose works survive only in fragments. He mentions Μύης (Myes). Subsequently the historians, Herodotus and Thucydides call it Μυοῦς. The ultimate authority probably should be the inscriptions, which refer to a city-ethnic, or name of the demos, as Μυήσιοι or Μυήσσιοι based on Μύης. These names are also abbreviated in coins minted by Myus.

Herodotus calls Myus a polis and its citizens politai, which means that it had a politeia, or constitution, and was considered an independent state, at least in its earlier times. It had a demos, which would have met in assembly, and a ruling council (boule). It struck its own coins.

== Site topography ==
=== Original Miletus Bay ===
The isochrons of delta progradation at the Maeander River's mouth. One red line represents the visible edge of the delta. The map is a representation of one published in the Barrington atlas of the Greek and Roman World. (Note: Over the few centuries since alluvual portrayals of the region have been initiated a large number of representations have been published. Some attempt to portray isochrons by date; others by period. As periods are almost never sharply defined, there is no reliable one-to-one correspondence between the two types. As the technology for sampling dates improves and the data for the area accumulates the maps expectedly become more accurate. This map depicts period isochrons. Maps with relatively recent date isochrons can be found in the references. The reader looking for greater precision will have to find it in the scientific core studies and reports, usually available only in specialized or private libraries.)

Myus was placed on a small peninsula jutting northwestward from Mount Latmus into a then estuary of the Aegean Sea, possibly called the Milesian kolpos ("bay" or "gulf"), at the mouth of the Maeander River. Downstream on the same bank a somewhat larger peninsula extending from Mount Grion was the site of Miletus. Across the estuary loomed Mount Mycale, on the southern flank of which Priene was placed. Between Mount Grion and Mount Latmus was an estuary on the estuary, called the Latmian kolpos, on the inland shore of which a smaller settlement, Heracleia, was placed. It was not part of the Ionian League. It may have been Carian. In this precipitous terrain was little room for agriculture, but the geological setting with multiple sheltered harbors was an ideal base for a maritime power.

Far to the north of the estuarial flood plain, at the point where it changes direction from northeast to east, was another settlement, originally a colony of the Aeolians, which they had named after a district of their homeland, Ancient Magnesia. The original was in Thessaly. Historians of the times made the distinction by calling the Anatolian one Maiandros, "Magnesia on the Maeander." It was always on the Maeander, never in the estuary. The closest city today is Tekin, at about 52.37 km (32.54 mi) from the mouth of the Maeander.

For most of its existence in the BCE Magnesia was not part of Ionia, and was not considered so. It arrived at a treaty with Miletos drawing a border between the two in the vicinity of the Island of Hybanda, which was also the border of Ionia. Hybandia remained Ionian. The Aeolian tradition came to an end when the city was conquered by the Ionians, and was resettled as Ionia. The architecture suddenly became Ionian. The imperial conquerors of the region, the Macedonians and Romans, treated it as Ionia. Something similar can be said of Tralles upstream, and the current location of Aydin. In Roman geography Tralles is the border of Ionia. None of this extension of Ionia to the north and east occurred during the lifespan of Myus.

=== Maeander river ===
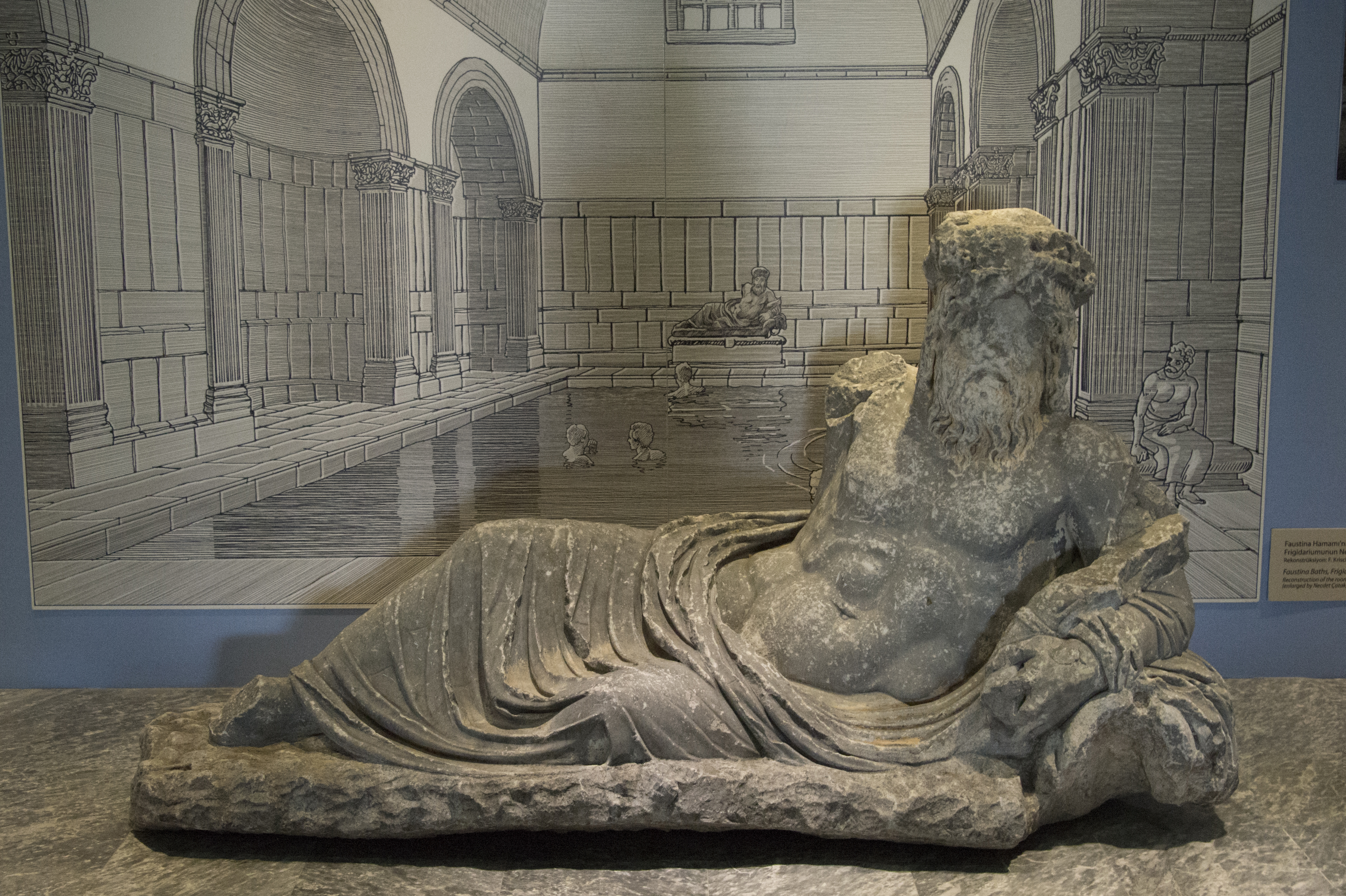
Patron deity of the Maeander River, Miletus Museum

Over the centuries the base proved untenable. The Maeander River, known subsequently in geology as the type for its sinuous configurations, beginning as a steeply cut dendritic pattern in the highlands to the east, empties into an east-west trending rift. Because of the large number of tributaries and the periodic flooding, the water carries a high sedimentary load in suspension, which it dumps into the rift, creating a flat ribbon of land that progrades to the west. The river wanders down it in multiple streams of high sinuosity, changing configuration at every flood. It reached the Aegean many centuries ago and continues to deposit a delta out into it.

The river basin contains 2,600,967 ha (10,042.39 sq mi), 3.3% of Turkey's surface area. About 44% is used for agriculture, most of the rest being for industry and residences. The river flows through 10 provinces, Aydin city being 68.27 km (42.42 mi) from the mouth. The mouth is at 37°32′25″N 27°10′08″E, the farthest extreme of a complex of barrier islands and lagoons.

=== Placement of the city ===
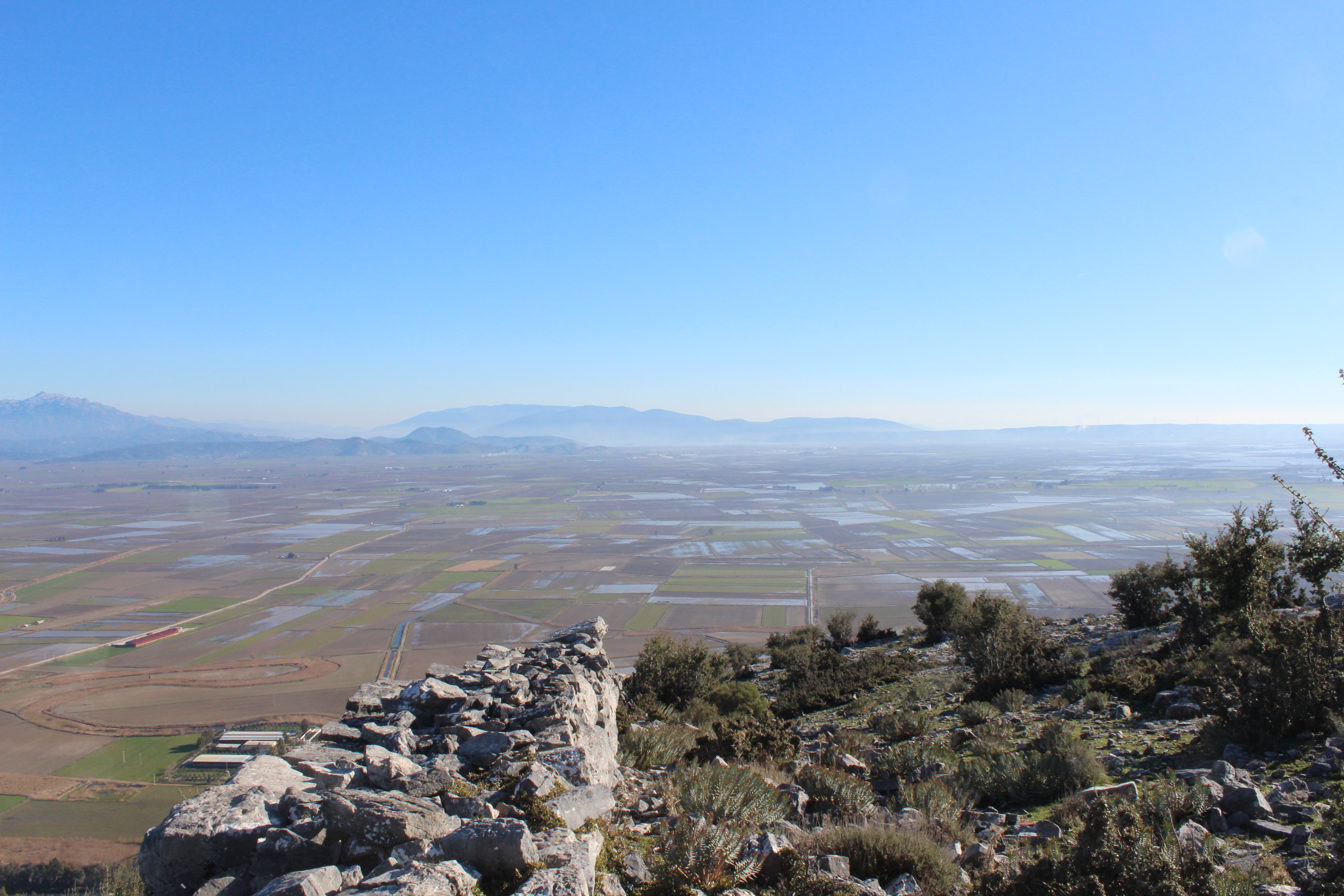
The former Miletus Bay from the site of Priene. Mount Latmus is in the background left, the central background land is the promontory of Myus, and the right background is MIletus on the left, the Aegean on the right.

The site of the city lies north of the modern village Avşar in the Söke district of Aydın Province, Turkey. The former asty of Myus, now a park, Myus Antik Kenti (Turkish), was placed on a ridge, a former promontory, an extension of Mount Latmus, now located 24.70 km (15.35 mi) from the current edge of the delta. The promontory appears currently as two islands in the plain, a small one on the NW extremity dubbed Castle Hill by the archaeologists for the Byzantine fort upon it. It has an elevation of 56 feet. The other apparent island at the base of the peninsula is dubbed Settlement Hill from the traces of settlement upon it. It ascends Mount Latmus in progressively wider and higher stages. The total peninsula, about 0.5 mi. long, has always been known as the location of the city. However, there are no walls, no residential blocks or public buildings beyond a few temples, or any dock facilities. Nothing delimits the boundaries of the city.

Settlement Hill on the east borders the shore of Lake Azap, a shallow, intermittent body, obviously standing on the site of the old estuary on that side. The length of the lake when full is 2.17 km (1.35 mi). It appears to have been in the east angle of the promontory when Myus was inhabited. There certainly would have been room for the 200 ships known to have anchored in the harbor at one time, if the harbor were there. If the land north of an east-west line tangent to the south of the lake were considered the promontory, it would be 1.8 km (1.1 mi) in a N-S direction, 1.98 km (1.23 mi) in an E-W direction, with the modern village in the SW corner, plenty of room for an asty that could accommodate 200 ships and be a maritime trading partner.

There is as yet no evidence of that being the case. Core samples obtained from the bay on the western side of the promontory identify the potential sites of Archaic-period and Classical-period harbors. Which ones were used at which times for what purposes remain unknown. Both sides were lagoons, nearly enclosed bays yet still connected to open water and in possession of marine environments. The location of the pond that developed in Hellentistic times driving the citizens out with its mosquitos remains unknown.

Above the base of the promontory the altitude is over the 100 meter line. The territory of such a polis must have been larger, and have included some if not all of Mount Latmus. Whether it extended to the shores of Lake Bafa, another former inlet, is unknown. The city is known to have quarried and exported Latmian stone for fortifying Miletus with walls.

=== Progradation in the gulf ===
Progradation played such a large part in the life and destinies of the Ionian cities that even before the 20th century the scholars had been trying to coordinate sedimentary events with historical ones. From the latter 20th century palynologists and geologists have been taking a hand, taking hundreds of core samples from select locations. A number of color isochronic representations exist. They do not all agree. Core sampling continues.

In a nutshell, the coast of Anatolia is a submergent coastline. Sea level has been rising since about 14,000 BP, reaching its current level 6000-5500 BP, in the Neolithic. The rise created long bays. Subsequently progradation could begin, on the Maeander at Aydin, currently 65 km (40 mi) from the mouth.

=== Sedimentary events at Myus ===
==== The coast of Ionia at Miletus Bay ====
The shoreline map of Ionia in general use currently is based on an original published in a work by M. Müllenhoff in 2005, repeated in other works in which he collaborated, including a relatively recent article in Hesperia. This color map is based on 300 core samples of the area. The material in the cores was carbon-dated.

The oldest delta line on it is dated to 1500 BC, running about orthogonally across the valley from 37°42′29″N 27°22′53″E to 37°37′55″N 27°31′34″E, 15.61 km (9.70 mi) across, 29.43 km (18.29 mi) from the current mouth of the river. This line represents the coast at the time. According to Velleius Paterculus (Roman History 1.4.3) the Ionians "occupied the best known portion of the sea coast which is now called Ionia...." The date assigned to the occupation event by Velleius is 750 BC.

Velleius is undoubtedly correct about characterizing the original Ionia as a coastal region, as is implied by the other authors, who list coastal towns and islands. The date, however, is not compatible with the isochrons on the map. The 800 BC line is further south, roughly parallel to the 1500 BC line. It encompasses the former island of Hybanda, dangerously close to the port of Myus, to which it belongs. Priene has been swallowed up and is now accessible only up the northern branch of the Maeander. Pliny the Elder states that "Hybanda, once an Ionian island, is now only 25 miles from the sea." (Natural History 1-11, 2.91.1). Apparently 750 BC is not early enough by far to describe Hybanda as an island. The Ionian coast at the time of the settlement of Myus and Priene, and the conversion of Miletus to Ionian, must be further north and further back in time.

Velleius' date, however, is near the date of formation of the first known Ionian League, a confederacy of the dodekapoleis, the "twelve cities." (Note: Words such as decapolis or dodecapolis are terms from ancient Greek political science referring to standard alliances, which might not necessarily contain the standard 10 or 12, or whatever. The Ionians had 13 poleis in their alliance, but some subsequent authors might drop one arbitrarily to make 12.) Many of the late sources on the Ionians, up to the present day, compress the previous history taking the Ionian League to represent the entire presence of the Ionians in Ionia, so that their migrations, city-building, and allying would all be done at the same time, in the same year even, an impossible idea. Before any such league can be formed there have to be 12 cities to form it. Rubinstein points out that "Ionian" has three levels of meaning, "a wider ethnic identity," the Greek population in Anatolia, or a member of the League.

==== The date of the Ionian League ====
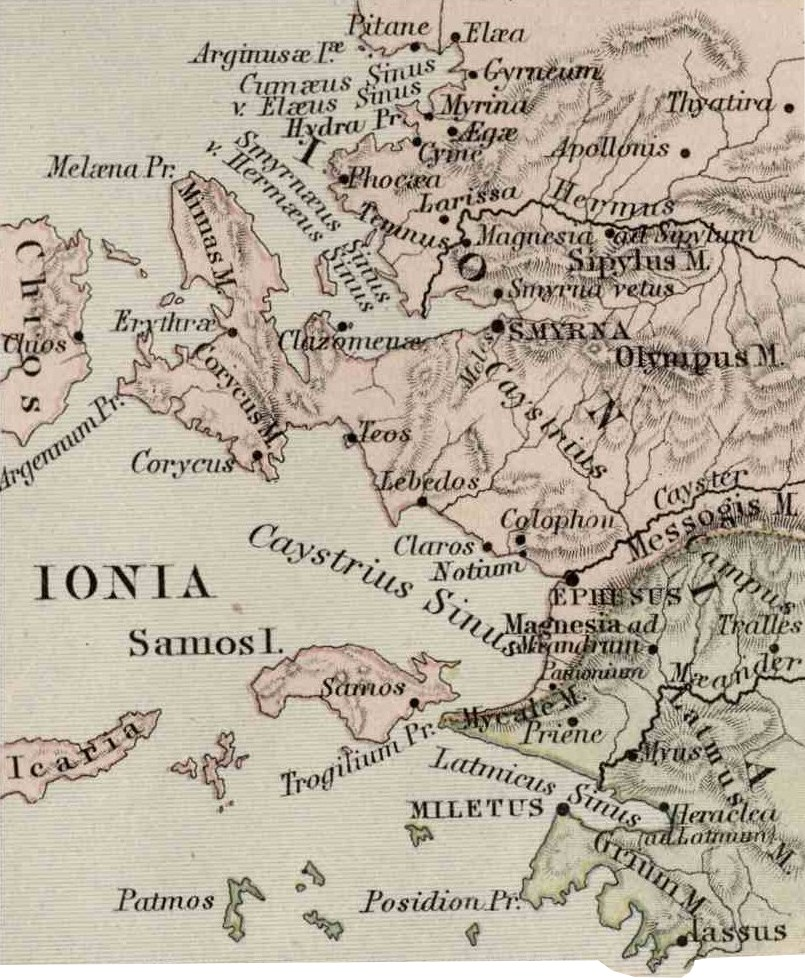
Ionia

The League is known in history by a number of names, some of them equivocal or anachronistic, but one name that is certain is its meeting place, the Panionion, which included a temple. There a yearly festival was conducted, the Panionia. It location was on Mount Mycale, a spot on an elevation roughly in the center of the 13 cities of the League. The location, Panionion, appears in the Histories of Herodotus, the earliest known European history. (Note: Except for Hecataeus of Miletus, whose work is fragmentary.)

In this work the Ionians are present at different levels of meaning. Cyrus the Great sends heralds asking the Ionians to join him in an assault on Lydia (I.76). Its ruler, Croesus, had sieged and enslaved Pteria, an eminent city of the Persian Empire. (Note: The location had been lost. An American archaeologist, Scott Branting, claims to have found it "near the village of Şahmuratlı in the Central Anatolian province of Yozgat" and to have begun excavation: "Lost City of Pteria finally unearthed in Turkey's Yozgat". 26 July 2016.) As the Ionians already had a treaty with Croesus, they passed up the opportunity. One cannot presume that a busy king on his way to battle sent heralds to every household in Ionia or even to every settlement. There must have been an Ionian representative body under the name "the Ionians."

After Cyrus defeated Croesus, the Ionians sent messengers post-haste to Cyrus offering him the same treaty they had had with Croesus. The king replied with a story about a flute player trying to entice fish from the sea by playing the flute. Getting no response he netted the fish and addressed them flopping on the shore: "You had best ... cease from your dancing now; you would not come out and dance then, when I played to you." He would not treat with the Ionians, but he would make a separate treaty with Miletus (Herodotus I.141) The other cities assembled at the Panionion, which suggests that they were in fact the Ionian League, and sent to Lacedaemon for assistance, an act undoubtedly intended to shock the Milesians, as the Lacedaemonians were Dorians, hereditary ethnic enemies of the Ionians. The date of the end of Croesus' reign, calculated to be 547 BC, was disestablished on the grounds of Herodotus using formulaic numbers for time periods, and re-established recently by considering the dates of coins.

There is an earlier date for the League. Herodotus insists on 12 cities, explaining that "they agreed among them to allow no other Ionians to use (the Panionion)," and then adds "nor indeed did any save the men of Smyrna ask to be admitted (Herodotus I.143). The Ionians took Smyrna from the Aeolians by trickery. Some Colophonian exiles waited until the men were absent at the festival and then locked them out. The Aeolian League coming to their assistance for cogent reasons unstated traded the city for its Aeolian citizens and all their possessions, accepting the loss of a city and distributing the refugees to the other 11 (Herodotus I.150). The case of Smyrna now vanishes from Herodotus without a follow-up.

Later authors picked up the trail, presumably using sources ignored by or not available to Herodotus. Pausanias confirms that the Ionians of Colophon took the city away from the Aiolians (Pausanias 7.5). (Note: Strabo fills in some of the earlier detail (Strabo 14.1.4). Some Ephesians took Smyrna away from the Leleges (Carians), but being driven out by the Aiolians, found refuge in Colophon, where they convinced the Colophonians to help retake Smyrna. Strabo's assertion that Ephesus was named Smyrna is less likely, as Ephesus took its name from its Bronze Age ancestor.) He then says "The Ionians allowed the Smyrnaeans to take their place in the general assembly at Panionium." Not right away, however, as Plato says that (at least for a time) the Colophonians got a double vote, one for Smyrna, in the Panionium. There is a date ante quem for the Ionian conquest of Smyrna: the Olympic Games of 688 BC had an Ionian victor from Smyrna.

Vitruvius has something to say on the acceptance of Smyrna as an Ionian city, but it is so unusual, and so late, that some doubt its historicity. Athens sent 13 colonies, he says, to settle on the coast of Caria (Vitruvius 4.1.4). Twelve of these are the ones stated in Herodotus. The extra was Melia, or Melite. But according to Hecataeus of Miletus (in Stephanos of Byzantium under Melia) Melia was a polis of Caria. As such it was not Greek and not Ionian. Although it is true that the Carians were co-marauders and co-conspirators ranging over the Cyclades and Crete the idea of Carians colonizing Caria is far-fetched. One solution is that Melia cooperated with the colonization by synoecisizing with Priene thereby being qualified to share in the League.

A second problem is that Vitruvius attributes the admission of Smyrna to "the kindness of King Attalus and Arsinoe." However, the Ionians of the times were independent and acted independently. There are no overall rulers nor any powerful figures of those names; moreover, the names are not even known at that early date, but only appear among the Hellenistic and Roman aristocracy. The one solution proposed by a few exponents supposes that the Smyrnaeans waited for their petition to be approved for hundreds of years. Even so, the identities are totally speculative.

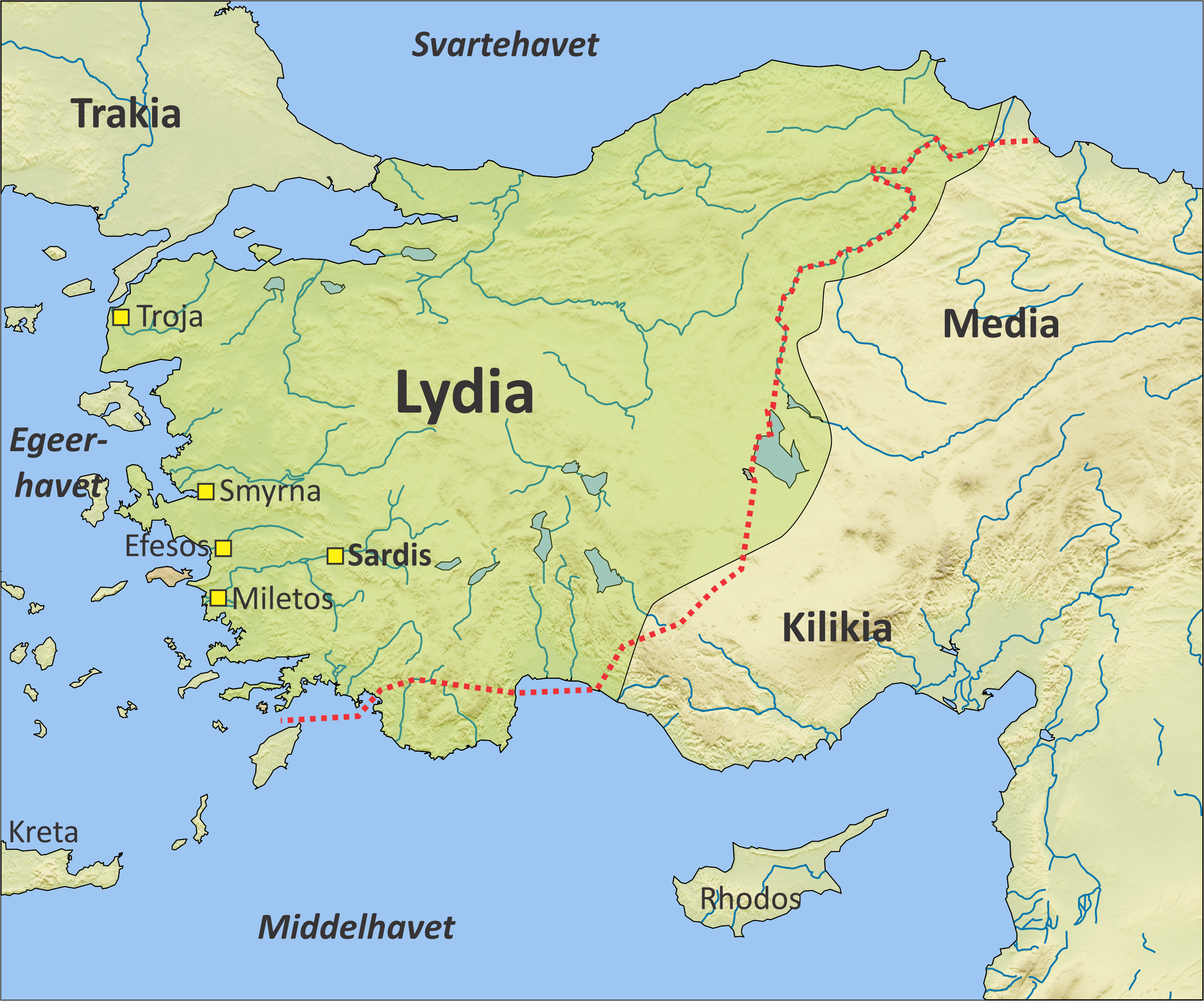
Lydia

As to the reason for the wait, it seems that there was no Smyrna to be admitted. The Anatolian speakers making a play to restore their predominance recreated the kingdom of Lydia wresting control of it from the previous Greek-related dynasty. This Lydia took Caria under its wing. Over a period of about 88 years from 688 BC to 600 BC they incorporated Ionia city by city, which resisted. If the Lydian kings found resistance they resorted to treaties. Smyrna defeated the first king, Gyges of Lydia. He was killed in battle against the Cimmerians, an early Iranian people who occupied the region for a time. They held and kept Mount Mykale. The Ionians were glad to play them off against the Lydians to achieve quasi-independence.

In the end the great-grandson of Gyges, Alyattes defeated the Cimmerians and drove them off. Most of the Ionians were given treaties after submission. For unspecified reasons Alyattes razed Smyrna, took away its status as polis, and left the populace in villages. It remained a non-polis long after the Medes and Persians held the area, unable to make any petitions or receive any answers. According to Strabo (Geography 14.1.37) it remained villages for 400 years until after Alexander in 334 BC decided to restore it. The project got put off until the Macedonian kings decided to make good on it about 200 BC. They did not use the old site, which they called Old Smyrna, but picked a new site nearby, New Smyrna. These circumstances suggest that the League did not wait for 400 years, but the Smyrna of 688 BC was fully enfranchised. The case of the missing benefactors remains open.

A closer view of the north shore of Mycale, which is also the mouth of the Cayster, showing a truer depiction of the territory of Melia; that is, most if not all of northern Ionia.

Vitruvius' passage despite its problems appears the more authoritative because of a public inscription from Priene, dated 196-192 BC. This long inscription records an award of disputed territory at and around Fort Karion (on Mykale) to Priene, instead of to the other claimant, Samos, by a board of Rhodian arbitrators. The grounds of the award was the distribution of the territory of Melia after it was destroyed by the Ionian League in an event the inscription calls the meliakos polemos, "Melic War." This Melic War must be the one mentioned in Vitruvius. There was only one Melia on Mykale.

== History ==
=== Foundation of the polis ===
The city was said to have been founded by Cyaretus (Ancient Greek: Κυάρητος) (sometimes called Cydrelus), a son of Codrus.

It was the smallest among the twelve Ionian cities,

=== Under the Persians ===
Myus was one of the three towns given to Themistocles by the Persian king.

=== In the Ionian revolt ===
Instigated by Aristagoras of Miletus, the Ionian Revolt broke out here. It was the beginning of the Greco-Persian Wars.

=== In the Delian League ===
During the Peloponnesian War the Athenians experienced a check near this place from the Carians.

=== Municipal unit of Miletus ===
In the days of Strabo the population was so reduced that they did not form a political community, but became incorporated with Miletus, whither in the end the Myusians transferred themselves, abandoning their own town altogether. This last event happened, according to Pausanias, on account of the great number of flies which annoyed the inhabitants; (Note: The translation of the ancient Greek word as mosquito or fly is hypothetical. The etymological entomology is obscure. Some use gnat, which is no more precise. Other, less careful sources leap ahead of the text, presuming that it was mosquitoes, that they were malarial and that the problem was malaria, or "plague." There is, however, no mention of any disease; furthermore, the ancients were unaware that malaria is transmitted by certain types of mosquito. They believed it was "bad air." The entomology of mosquitoes in the region is complex and transitory. There are multiple genera and more species of mosquito, some fresh-water, some brackish-water. The presence or lack of mosquitoes cannot be used as an indicator of the salinity of the water. A description of a modern problem probably similar can be found at Istanbul further north: "Mosquitoes return for summer in Istanbul, more ubiquitous than ever". Daily Sabah. 4 August 2022.) but it was more probably on account of the frequent inundations to which the place was exposed. Philip V of Macedonia, who had obtained possession of Myus, ceded it to the Magnesians in 201 BC.

== Archaeology ==
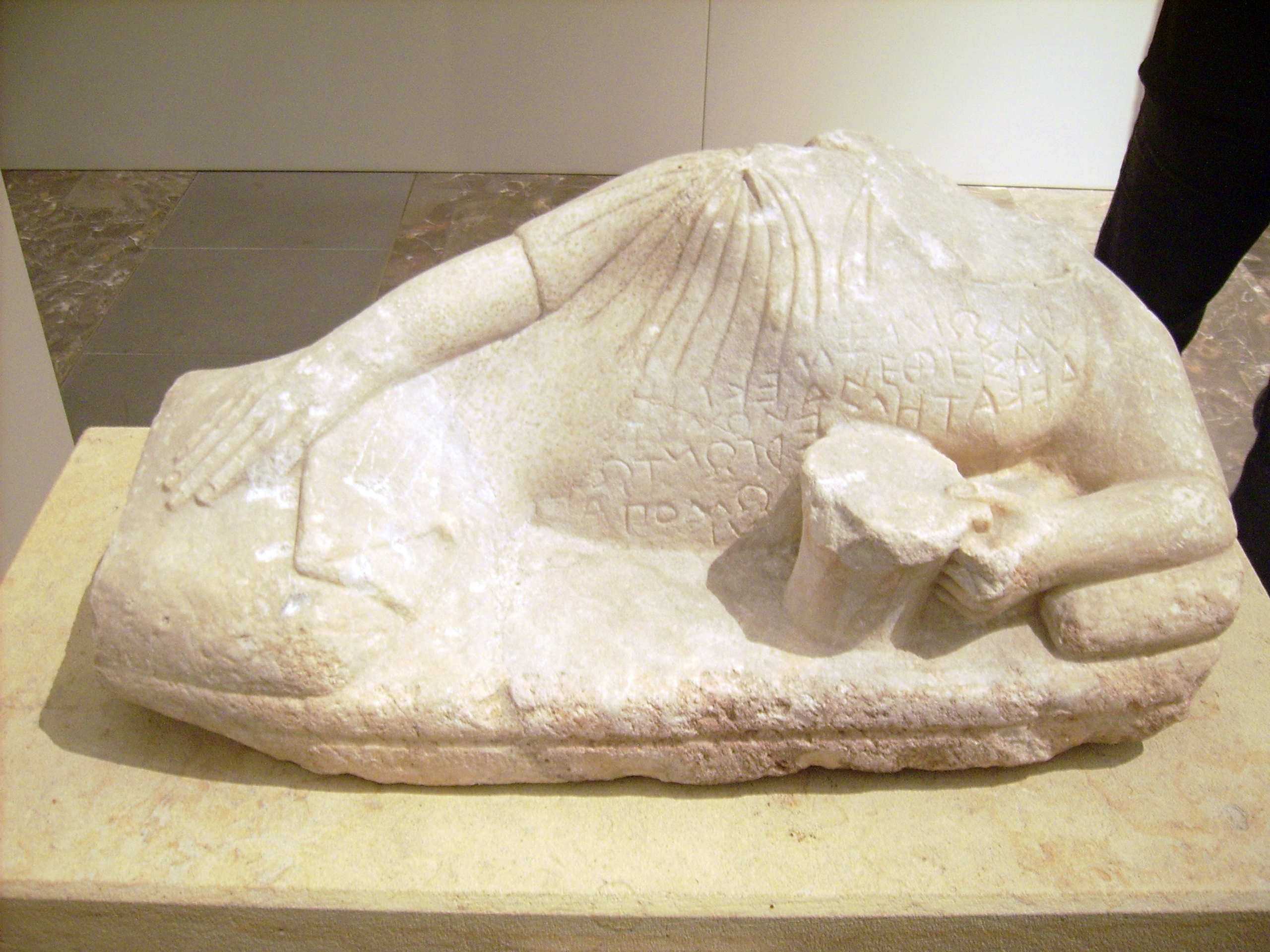
Ancient Greek votive offering to Apollo with dedicatory inscription in boustrophedon text, Myus, mid sixth century BC, Altes Museum, Berlin

Archaeological surveys of the area were performed in 1934 and 1936 by H. Weber. He found the remains of two temples, but not much else. It is hypothesized that after the population moved to Miletus porting their moveables, the site was opened as a stone quarry.

=== Temples ===
Myus had both a temple of Athena and a temple of Herodotus and sources tell us that it was always secondary to Miletos.

The only edifice noticed by the ancients at Myus was a temple of Dionysus, built of white marble.

== See also ==
- Ionian League
- List of ancient Greek alliances
- List of ancient Greek cities

== Reference bibliography ==
- Akay, Semih Sami; et al. (2020). "UAV-based evaluation of morphological changes induced by extreme rainfall events in meandering rivers". PLOS ONE. 15 (11): 1–29. Bibcode:2020PLoSO..1541293A. doi:10.1371/journal.pone.0241293. PMC 7652340. PMID 33166295.
- Brückner, Helmut; et al. (2003). "Holocene coastal evolution of western Anatolia – the interplay between natural factors and human impact" (PDF). No. 24 - Human records of recent geological evolution in the Mediterranean. CIESM Workshop Monographs. Santorini. pp. 51–56.
- Brückner, Helmut; et al. (2017). "Life cycle of estuarine islands — From the formation to the landlocking of former islands in the environs of Miletos and Ephesos in western Asia Minor (Turkey)". Journal of Archaeological Science: Reports. 12: 876–894. Bibcode:2017JArSR..12..876B. doi:10.1016/j.jasrep.2016.11.024.
- Herda, Alexander; et al. (2019). "From the Gulf of Latmos to Lake Bafa: On the History, Geoarchaeology, and Palynology of the Lower Maeander Valley at the Foot of the Latmos Mountains". Hesperia. 88 (1): 1–86. doi:10.2972/hesperia.88.1.0001. S2CID 135167164.
- Rubinstein, Lene (2004). "Ionia". In Hanson, Mogens Herman; Nielson, Thomas Heine (eds.). An Inventory of Archaic and Classical Poleis. Oxford: Oxford University Press. pp. 1053–1107.
