= Dilek Peninsula-Büyük Menderes Delta National Park =

National park in Turkey

- Dilek Yarımadası-Büyük Menderes Deltası Millî Parkı
- IUCN category II (national park)
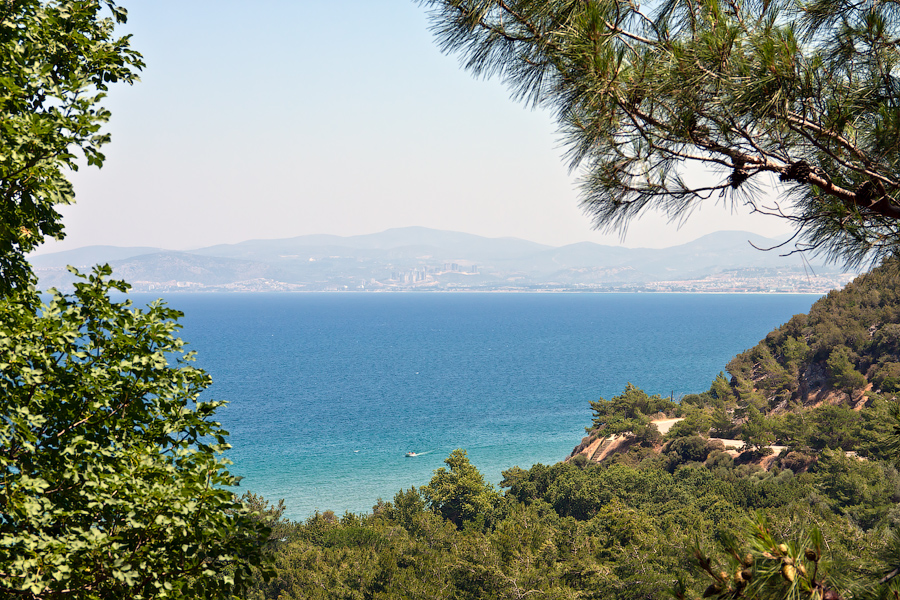
- An outlook from a trail

- Location within Turkey
- Location: Kuşadası, Aydın Province, Turkey
- Nearest city: Güzelçamlı, Turkey
- Coordinates: 37°40′08.14″N 27°09′42.32″E
- Area: 27,598 ha (68,200 acres)
- Established: May 19, 1966
- Governing body: Ministry of Forest and Water Management
- Website: dilekyarimadasi.gov.tr

Dilek Peninsula-Büyük Menderes Delta National Park (Turkish: Dilek Yarımadası-Büyük Menderes Deltası Millî Parkı), established on May 19, 1966, is a national park in western Turkey. It contains within its borders the entirety of the Dilek Peninsula as well as the large delta of the Büyük Menderes River. The park is located in the Kuşadası district of Aydın Province — part of Turkey's Aegean Region. Directly west of the national park is the small coastal town of Güzelçamlı, where several shuttle buses and ferries operate to and from the district's center of Kuşadası, approximately 30 km (19 mi) from the park.

The park is among the most biologically diverse of Turkey's national parks. It is the native and migratory habitat of hundreds of species of birds, mammals, plants, and marine life, some of which are entirely endemic to the park and cannot be observed anywhere else in the world. For these reasons, it is protected by numerous wildlife and wetland conventions, and is of great national and international importance in these areas.

It is separated from the Greek island of Samos (Greek: Σάμoς) by a very narrow strait, known as the Mycale Strait (Greek: Στενό της Μυκάλης). The strait is named after Mount Mycale, the highest and most prominent mountain of the peninsula, and is one of the narrowest straits in the Aegean Sea.

== History ==
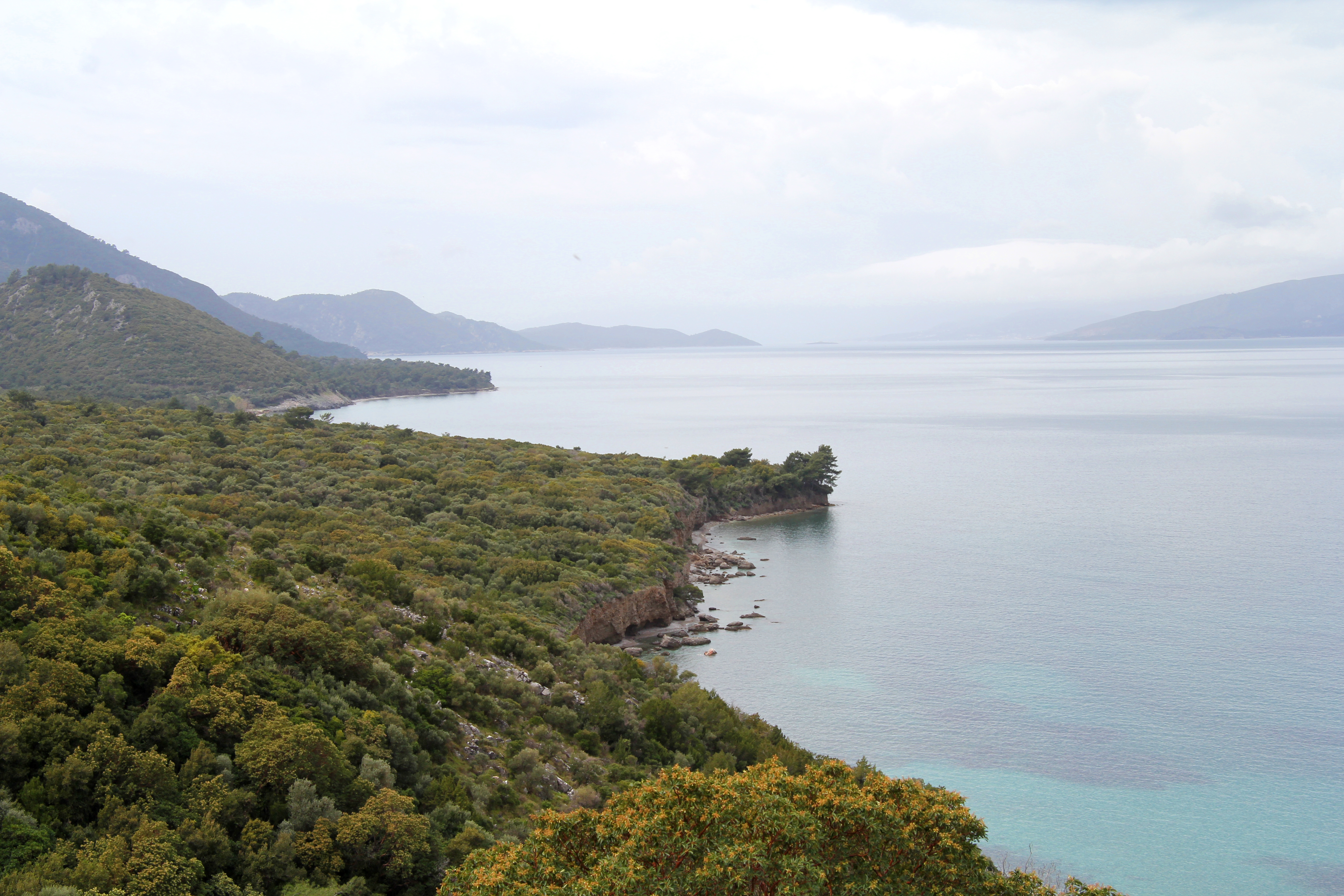
A view of the park

For most of the area's existence, the lands from the Dilek Peninsula southwards to the end of the Büyük Menderes River's large delta were uninhabited by people or very sparsely settled, and were otherwise untouched by human influence. As a result of this isolation, the area was considerably populated with numerous species of plants and wildlife, most of which still remain within the park today. Eventually, under Ancient Greek and especially Ionian influence, several settlements near Mount Mycale and the Büyük Menderes Delta were built, such as Priene and Miletus. Nearby, Panionium was erected as the meeting place of the Ionian League. During modern times, and despite a significant increase in population and density in areas near the port town of Kuşadası, it was not until May 19, 1966 that the Turkish Ministry of Forest and Water Management declared Dilek Peninsula a government-protected national park. Several decades later, in 1994, the Büyük Menderes river delta adjacent to the peninsula in the south was also promoted to national park status.

=== Events ===
In early 2005, a severely wounded Mediterranean monk seal (Monachus monachus) was found within the Büyük Menderes Delta. It was treated immediately, but due to complications died shortly afterwards. The Mediterranean monk seal is critically endangered, with only about 600 remaining in the world, and over 100 of which are within the maritime borders of Turkey.

Controversy surrounded the park in April 2010 after the chairman of the Aydın Beekeepers Association, Kadir Kılıç, claimed that beekeepers would be dispatched at the national park, which had been banned since its establishment in 1966. Debate continued for a short period of time, but the dispute was soon settled, as a representative of the Governor's Office of Aydın publicly asserted the provincial government's position on the matter. They denied the claims and confirmed that beekeepers would not be introduced to the park. Beekeepers are currently not allowed as a means of conserving the abundant flora of the park, many of which rely on bees for pollination.

== Geography ==
A full map of the national park including the names of ancient cities

The national park is 27,598 ha (68,200 acres) in total land area, with the peninsula itself having an area of about 110 km^{2} (42 sq mi), with a width of around 6 km (3.7 mi) from north to south and a length of 20 km (12 mi) east to west. It is located approximately 8 km (5.0 mi) from Davutlar, about 26 km (16 mi) from the district's seat of Kuşadası (estimates range from 23-30 kilometres), and is directly adjacent to the town of Güzelçamlı. Other nearby cities in Aydın Province have access roads to the park, including Aydın, Söke and, to a lesser extent, Didim.

The Mycale Strait separates the peninsula from the nearby island of Samos. Named after Mount Mycale, the strait is only about 1.6 km (0.99 mi) wide at its narrowest point, making it one of the Aegean Sea's smallest straits.

=== Popular features ===
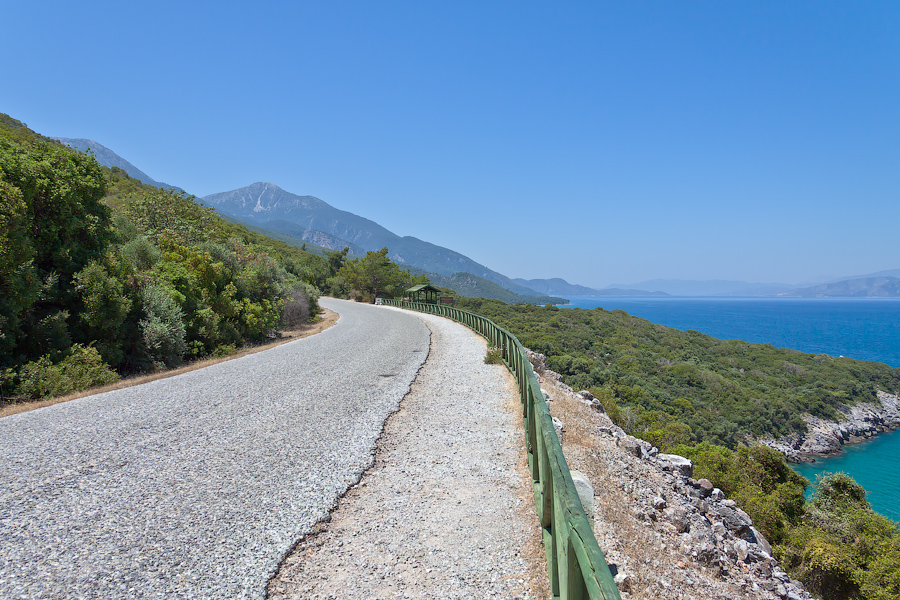
A view of the park with Mycale in the background

The mountainous terrain of the peninsula and its numerous caverns, canyons, and valleys result in the area being of high interest to both visitors and researchers. There are several coves along the shore that have been named in order to identify them easily. Upon entering the park from the east, the first and easternmost beach available to the public is known as İçmeler Cove (Turkish: İçmeler Koyu). This cove's waters are shallower than any other in the park, and its beaches are sandy, unlike some of the coves farther out. Therefore, it appears to be more popular amongst tourists than most of the remaining beaches and parts of Kuşadası are visible along the horizon from it. Aydınlık Cove is situated about 5 km (3.1 mi) further to the west, and has pebbly shores and deeper waters. It marks the transition point where the waters of the peninsula's beaches become more challenging. As a result, these beaches tend to attract more experienced swimmers and locals rather than tourists. After passing the jandarma (public safety patrol) checkpoint, a turn onto a road leads to a nearby canyon, immediately to the left. From this point on, there are several trails through the forests of the peninsula. One of them leads to the village of Doğanbey, and if followed further, leads to the nearby ancient Hellenistic port city of Karine. However, this path's final 9 km (5.6 mi) are limited in access, and a permit or an accompanying tour guide is required to proceed. The third cove along the peninsula, Kavaklı Burun Cove, and the final, westernmost cove accessible to the public, Karasu Cove, both provide close views of the island of Samos, and are significantly less visited than the former coves of the peninsula. At the very end of the peninsula appears its tallest mountain, Mycale (Turkish: Dilek Dağı), which looms over Samos and the strait of its namesake.

==== Cave of Zeus ====
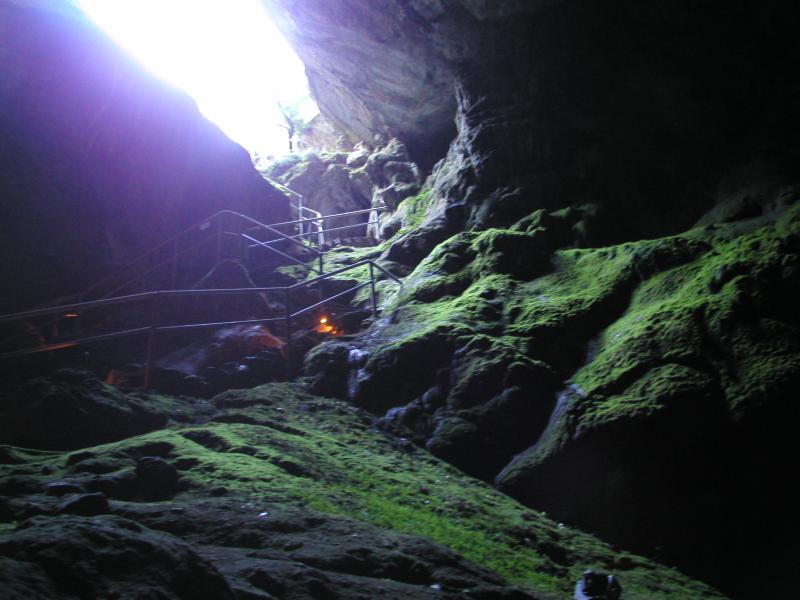
A view of the Cave of Zeus near the entrance

Immediately upon entry into the national park, a fork in the main path begins a trail running through the inner peninsula leading to a local cavern known as the Cave of Zeus (Turkish: Zeus Mağarası). The entrance is dense in vegetation, covering parts of it. There is also a wishing tree to which people usually tie objects and belongings, hoping for their wishes to be granted. The Cave of Zeus is filled with clear subterranean spring water, making it another common tourist attraction near the national park. Visits to the cave typically increase as the waters of the nearby beaches become rougher, thereby making them less inviting. The cave's name invokes the many legends that concern the cave and its origins, including one holding that Zeus bathed in the cave.

==== Büyük Menderes Delta ====
The wide mouth of the Büyük Menderes River (English: Great Meander) empties at the Aegean Sea, with an area of 16,613 ha (41,050 acres); larger than the entire Dilek Peninsula directly to the north, at only 10,985 ha (27,140 acres). The Büyük Menderes Delta is one of the most diverse wetlands in Turkey in terms of both vegetation and marine life, and is protected by several wetland agreements such as the Ramsar Convention. Its biodiversity is derived in part from the fertile lands and fresh waters of the delta, attracting numerous species to the area, including several migratory birds. The nearby mountains of the peninsula cause a marked temperature difference between the northern and southern faces of the peninsula, producing a corollary variance in the types of species found in the delta region. The area features a trail for visitors and options for canoeing and picnicking.

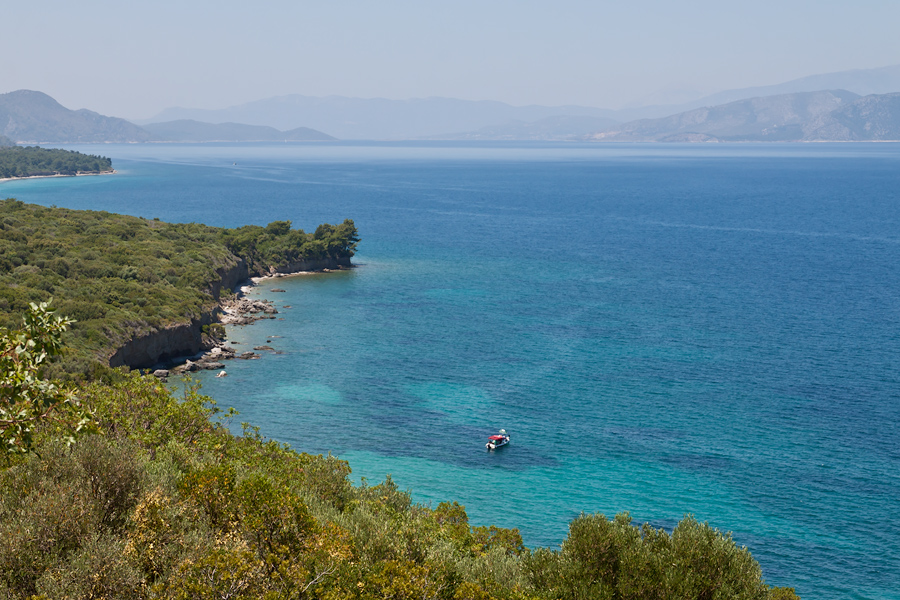
A view of a boat and one of the peninsula's smaller coves seen from a path facing west

=== Climate ===
Dilek Peninsula-Büyük Menderes Delta National Park has a Mediterranean climate (Köppen climate classification Csa), and as such, it is dry and mild throughout most of the year, except during the winters, when most of the yearly precipitation occurs. The average temperature year-round is about 18 °C (64 °F), ranging from average lows of 8 °C (46 °F) in the winter to highs of around 27 °C (81 °F) in the summer. However, on the mountaintops, as altitude increases, temperatures are usually much lower, with the annual mean temperature usually being no higher than 13 °C (55 °F). There are additional precipitation differences depending on elevation, and also between the north and south sides of the peninsula. Such precipitation amounts range from 900–1,500 mm (35–59 in) annually. Therefore, different species of foliage and plants live at higher altitudes than those at ground level, and the same is true when comparing the southern face of the peninsula and areas of the river delta with those to the north.

== Geology ==
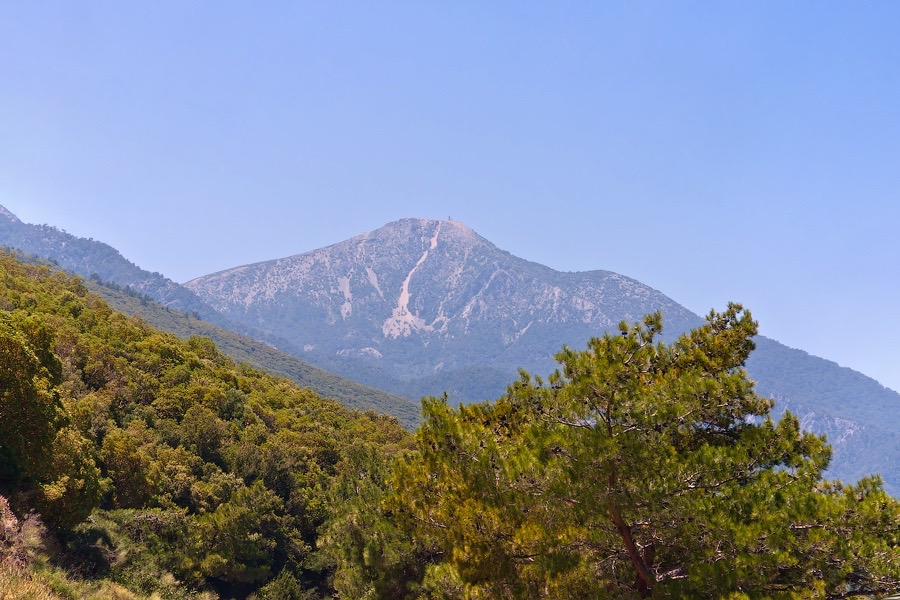
Mount Mycale

The terrain of the peninsula has much to do with the geology of the Aegean Region in general. The peninsula was shaped into its current form over several geological eras with the tectonic merging of Paleozoic schist formations, Mesozoic limestone and marble deposits, and finally the accretion of large clays and other sediments during the Neogene period. This is partly because of Turkey's unstable fault block terrain, and because of the close proximity of the Anatolian-Aegean plate boundary, which generates massifs of mountains all across western Turkey. This includes the peninsula and the mountains surrounding the Büyük Menderes River, known collectively as the Menderes Massif.

The peninsula is highly mountainous, with most of its mountains having elevations close to 1,200 m (3,900 ft) above mean sea level. Its highest mountain, Mount Mycale, is approximately 1,237 m (4,058 ft) high.

== Biology ==
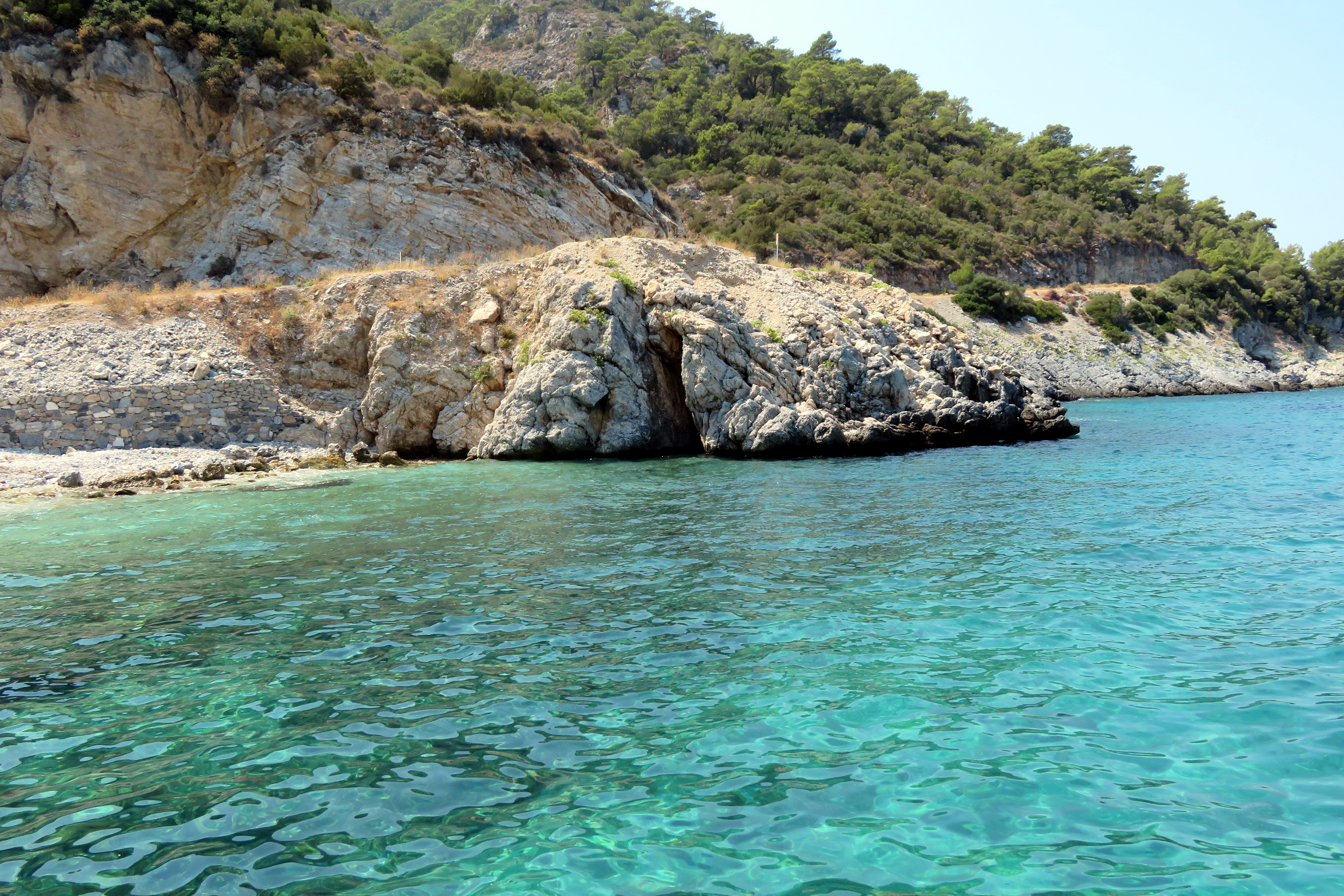
Dilek Peninsula Coves

The national park is quite diverse in its wildlife and vegetation, hosting approximately 804 distinct species of plants, 256 bird species, and an otherwise considerable variety of mammals, reptiles, and marine life. The entirety of the national park, including both Dilek Peninsula National Park and Büyük Menderes Delta National Park, is currently protected under the Ramsar Convention, the Berne Convention on the Conservation of European Wildlife and Natural Habitats, the Rio Convention on Biological Diversity, and the Barcelona Convention.

=== Flora ===
The park has a large diversity of vegetation. Due to the temperature and climate differences between different areas and elevations of the park, not only is the typical Aegean flora present, but also many specimens normally only found in separate coastal areas of Turkey, such as in the Mediterranean, Marmara, and Black Sea regions.

Out of the 804 species of flora distributed throughout the park, six are endemic, completely exclusive to the park area, and cannot be observed anywhere else on earth, while another 30 are indigenous. The most common and widely distributed plant species throughout the national park are Mediterranean maquis shrubs such as the Phoenician juniper (Juniperus phoenicea). Other common vegetative species within the area include the oleaster-leafed pear (Pyrus elaeagnifolia), Turkish pine (Pinus brutia), and elm-leaved sumach (Rhus coriaria).

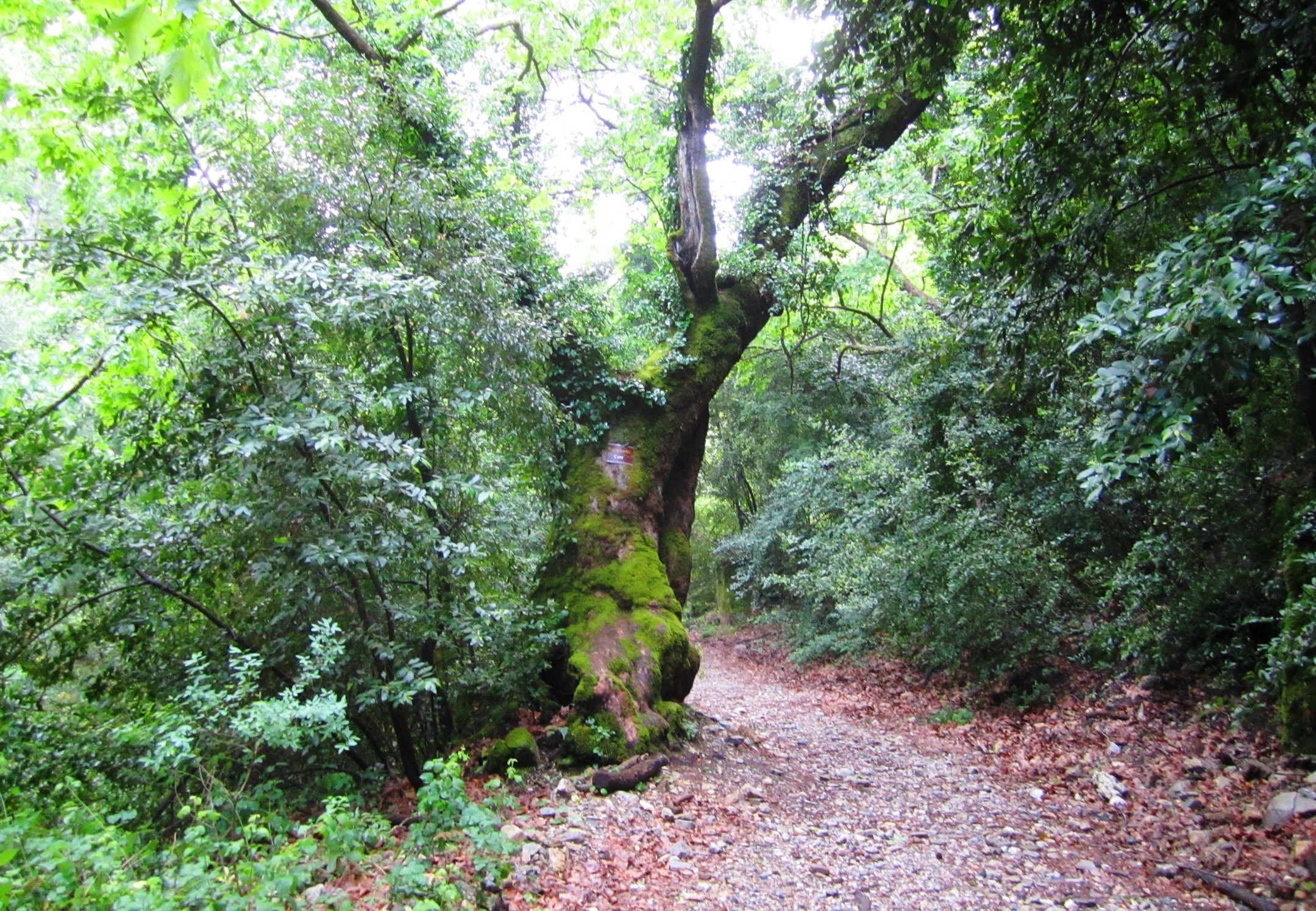
A tree viewed from within the forest

=== Fauna ===
In total, 28 species of mammals, 42 species of reptiles, and 45 fish species have been documented within the park. Wild boar (Sus scrofa) are native to the park. They are often found near the beaches where they feed on scraps and trash dropped by visitors. Further within the forests of the peninsula, other mammals can be spotted, such as golden jackals (Canis aureus), Eurasian lynx (Lynx lynx), and even striped hyenas (Hyaena hyaena) and caracals (Caracal caracal), among many others usually not native to such areas.

Along the southern shores of the peninsula, and within the river delta, exists a range of bird and marine life. Many of these species are endangered, which was one of the primary factors considered when placing the delta under national protection. Some of the more common bird species observed here include pygmy cormorants (Microcarbo pygmeus), little egrets (Egretta garzetta), lesser kestrels (Falco naumanni), Kentish plovers (Charadrius alexandrinus), white-tailed eagles (Haliaeetus albicilla), and the Dalmatian pelicans (Pelecanus crispus), for which the park is a key nesting place. Marine life consists of species typical of the Aegean Sea, as well as some species usually found elsewhere.

The biodiversity of local oceanic fauna is not well understood. Sea turtles and mammals, including monk seals, fin whales (only 1 sighting and 5 strandings have been documented in Turkish waters), and dolphins are considered to reside in the park area, although regularity of occurrences are unclear.

== Activities ==
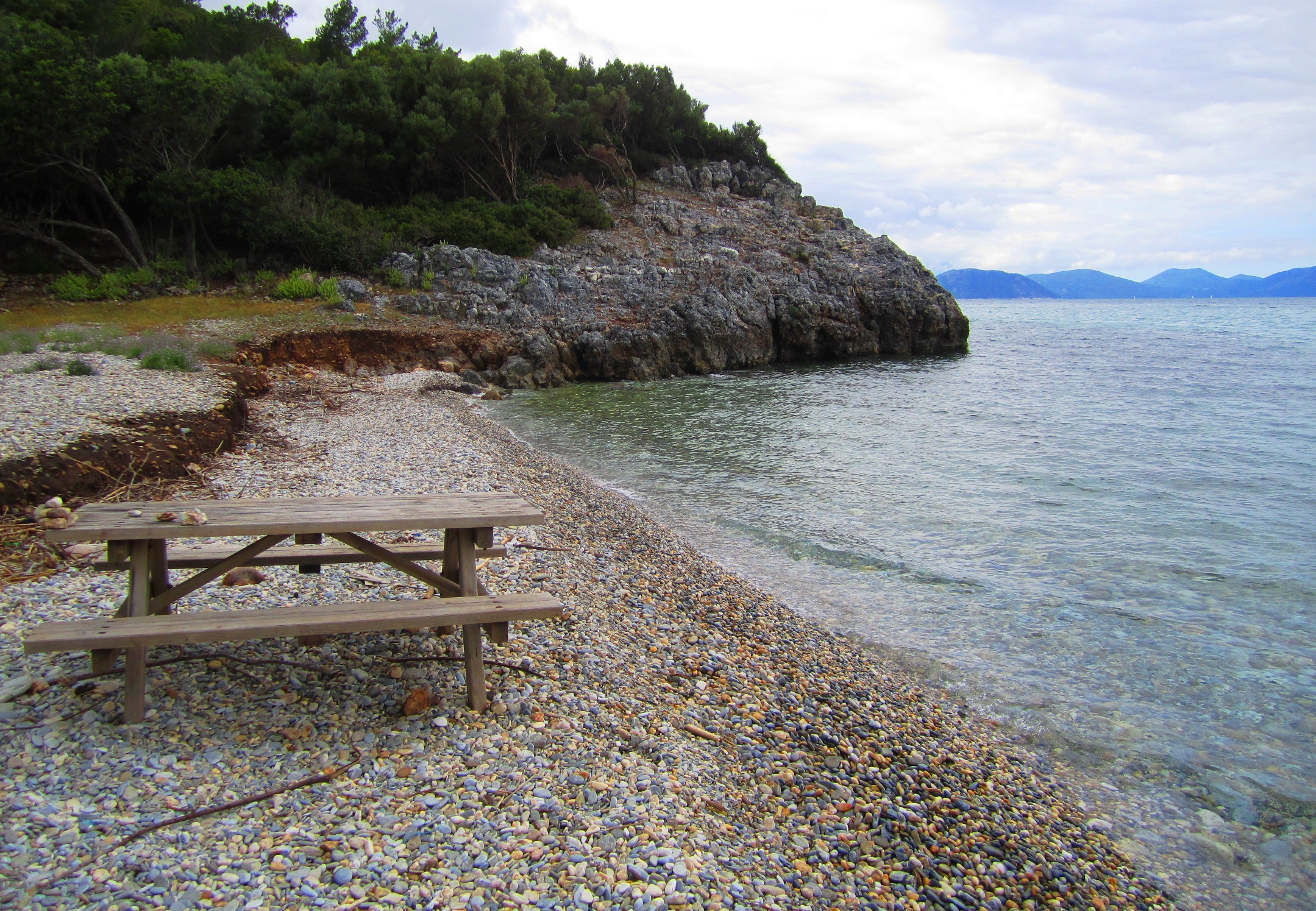
A small cove along the northern shore of the peninsula

Nature photography is a common activity in the park due to the large variety of flora and fauna, as well as landscape photography due to the mountainous terrain and views. There are several forest trails and high-elevation ventures used by hikers and mountaineers respectively. There are numerous other activities available for visitors, as well as some prohibited activities. For example, although recreational fishing is allowed, there are severe consequences for anyone found hunting within the jurisdiction of the park.

=== Tourism ===
The park is the most visited during the spring and summer months, when it is open between 8:00 and 19:00 (7:00 pm) local time. In autumn and winter, it closes at 17:00 (5:00 pm). Admission must be paid at the entrance. Camping, lighting fires, or setting up overnight shelters are strictly forbidden within the limits of the national park in order to protect the surrounding ecosystem. The park can be reached from the city center of Kuşadası via several dolmuş (share taxis) that regularly shuttle the route to the closest town of Güzelçamlı. Recently, there have also been ferry boat services operating back and forth between Kuşadası and Güzelçamlı, in turn providing easier access to the park for visitors. Each year, around 700,000 foreign and domestic tourists visit the park.

== See also ==
- Büyük Menderes River
- Mycale
- Mycale Strait
- List of national parks of Turkey
- List of peninsulas of Turkey
- List of rivers of Turkey
