= Oikonomos =

Title

Oikonomos (Greek: οἰκονόμος, from οἰκο- 'house' and -νόμος 'rule, law'), Latinized œconomus, oeconomus, or economos, was an Ancient Greek word meaning "household manager." In Byzantine times, the term was used as a title of a manager or treasurer of an organization.

It is a title of honor awarded to priests in the Eastern Orthodox Church. It is also a title in the Roman Catholic Church. (Note: One or more of the preceding sentences incorporates text from a publication now in the public domain: Hove, Alphonse van (1913). "Episcopal œconomus". In Herbermann, Charles (ed.). Catholic Encyclopedia. New York: Robert Appleton Company.) In Canon 494 of the 1983 Code of Canon Law, an œconomus is the diocesan finance officer.

== In Ancient Greece ==
=== Role in the oikos ===
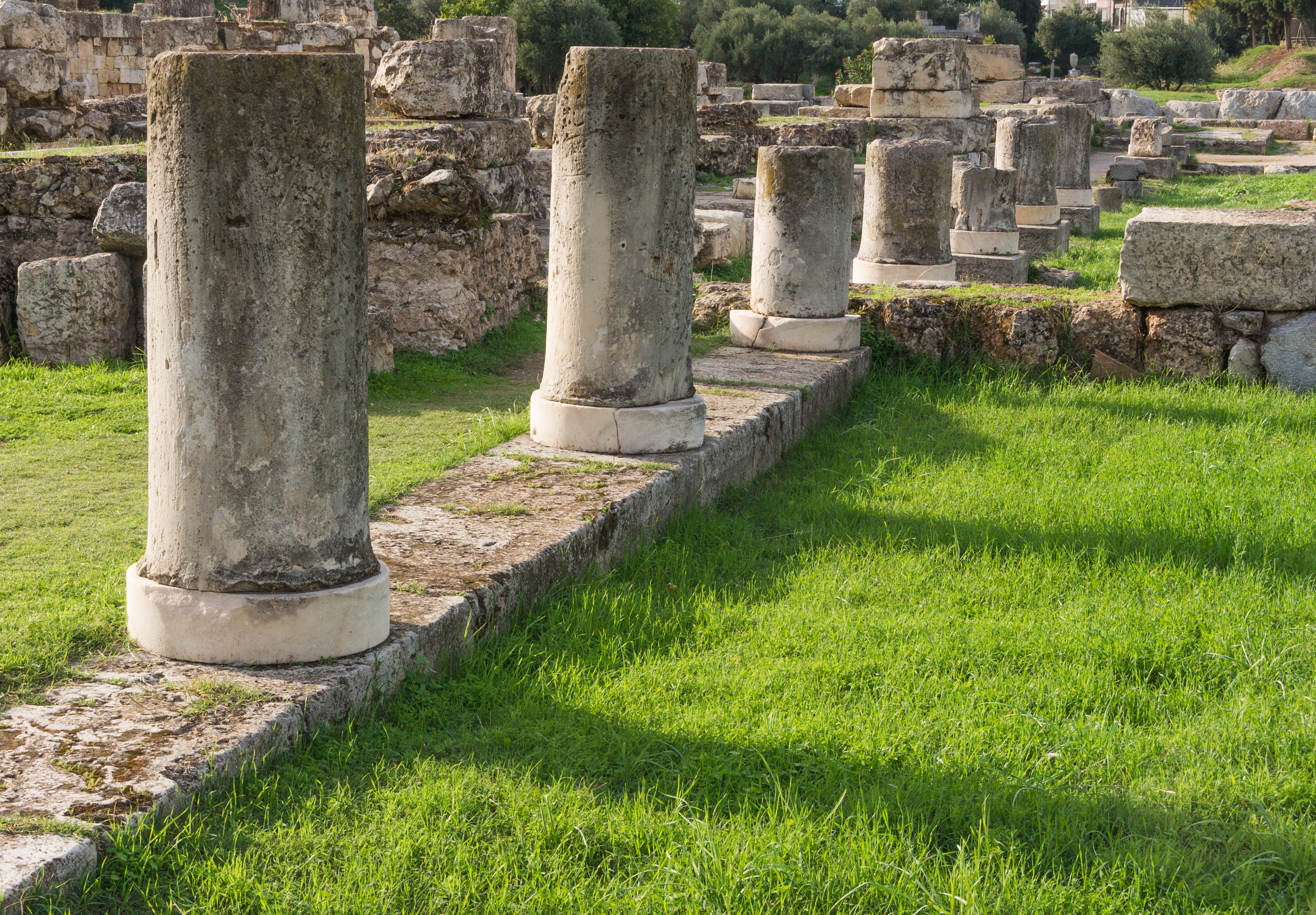
Ruins in Athens

The oikos (household) was the base unit for the organization of social, political, and economic life in the Ancient Greek world. The person in charge of all its affairs was the oikonomos. The oikos was composed of a nuclear family as well as extended family members such as grandparents or unmarried female relatives. The husband of the core nuclear family was generally the oikonomos. The ancient Greek world was a patrilocal society. A married woman would join her husband's oikos. However, the woman would still remain a member of the oikos she grew up in and would return to her original oikos upon the end of a marriage. The oikonomos of a household, in addition to making economic decisions for the oikos, acted as legal guardian, or kyrios (a word meaning 'lord' or 'controller'), for other members of the household. In this capacity, they were generally responsible for male members of the household under the age of 18, unmarried women, as well as their wife. Marriage in the Greek world was seen as the transfer of responsibility over a woman from one kyrios to another; in most cases, from her father to her husband. The kyrios was understood to make decisions in the best interest of his wards about education, finances, and marriage. Although it differed between different Greek cities, an oikonomos in Athens would have the authority to dispose of his wife's property owing to his role as her kyrios. In other cities, such as Gortyn and Sparta, it appears that married women had the right to use their property as they wished. The power of the oikonomos to act as kyrios was not unlimited. In Athens, an individual who had been under the care of a kyrios would be able to seek legal recourse for damages caused by their former kyrios. The oikonomos in his role as kyrios also had many responsibilities. He was expected to provide education for boys under his care, represent his wards in legal proceedings, provide for their everyday needs, as well as arrange marriages of women in his care.

In addition to family members by kinship or marriage, slaves or metics might have lived and worked within the household. Wealthy households would have had many slaves and metics working for them. The oikonomos of the household would have played a role in directing the labour of the slaves and metics. While the oikonomos did not have absolute power over members of his oikos owing to his role as kyrios, this was not the case for slaves. The Greeks did not consider him to be a kyrios to the slaves, he was instead their despotes, a word meaning master. In some extreme cases, slaves were seen as factors of production without any agency rather than autonomous human beings. A small oikos would have had only a few household slaves known as oiketai. Of the oiketai, the men might have had the responsibility to work in the field. In a larger oikos, many slaves would be entirely dedicated to agricultural work. This is generally considered to be less favourable than work in the house itself.

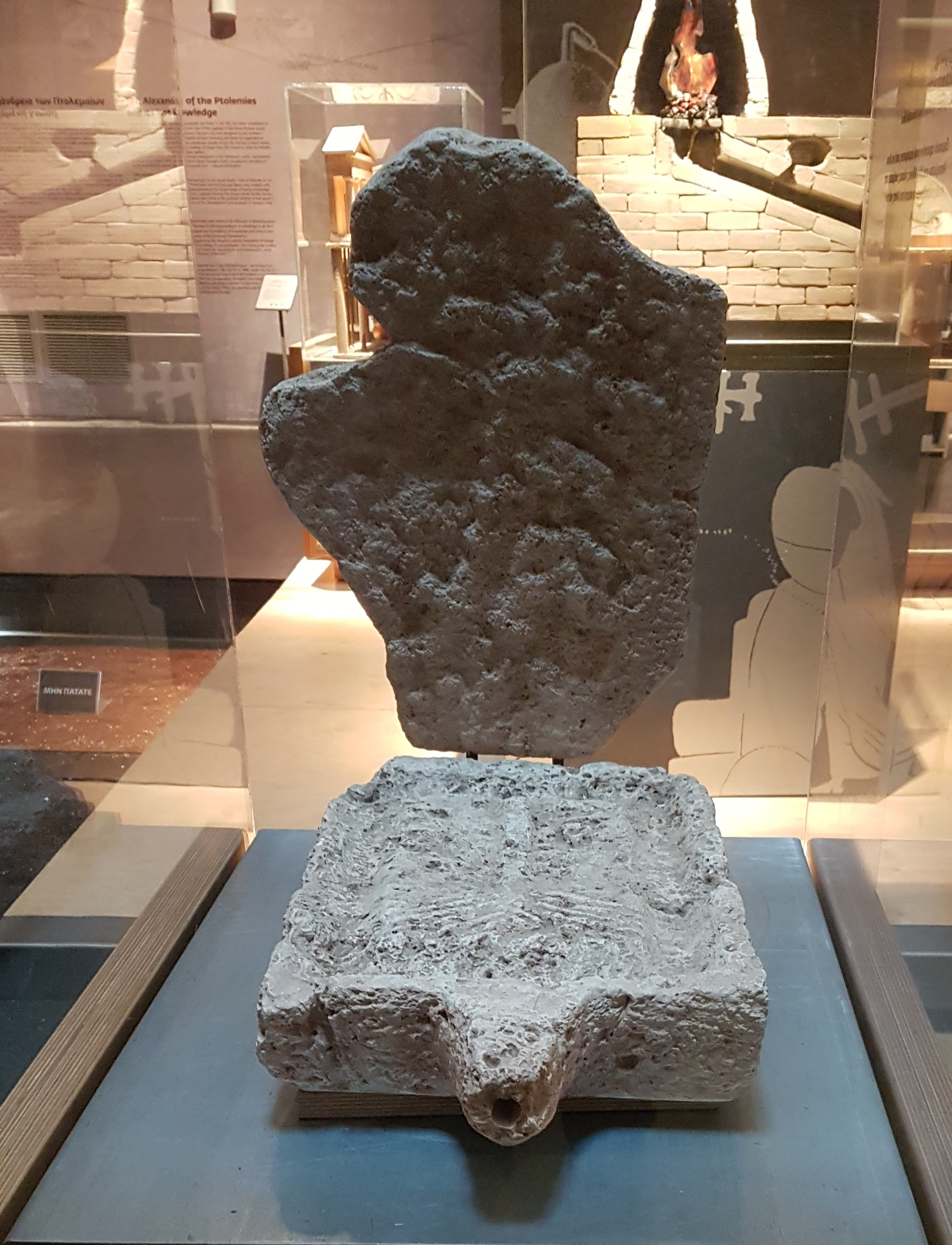
Ancient oil press

The oikos was the primary unit of economic organization within the ancient Greek world. Genuine urban commercial centers were relatively uncommon and sparse. Additionally, lack of trust between members of an oikos and nonmembers usually prevented larger businesses not associated with an oikos from forming. For these reasons, the oikos remained the pillar of ancient Greek economy. An oikos was expected to be self-sufficient in what it produced for itself. Thinkers such as Aristotle considered the self-sufficient oikos to be the fundamental, indivisible constituent of the polis. In order to be a true oikos, it had to be entirely self-sustaining it what it produced and consumed, as well as maintain its population over time. Most of the processing and storage facilities needed to run a farm, such as grain stores and oil presses, were found on the land owned by the oikos. The continued existence of the oikos was dependent on its ability to store goods for the future and the prudence of the oikonomos in anticipating future needs. Chance weather events, warfare, sick animals, pests, and even ageing members of the oikos could seriously threaten its existence. Households which practised a trade in addition to or instead of farming, often had their workshops located within the house in a room facing the street.

In addition to his plethora of economic and social responsibilities, the oikonomos would also be the representative of his oikos to the outside world. He would be expected to provide funds for religious festivals, attend important events such as births and marriages, as well as fulfill his civic duties as a member of the polis. Depending on the city, this might have included military service. The oikonomos was also expected to maintain relationships with other households in the polis. In the event of an emergency an oikonomos might be able to seek help from a neighbouring oikos. In return the oikonomos would be expected to provide material aid to these same neighbours in their own time of need. This effectively established a credit system for a pre-bank economy.

=== Ancient thinkers on the concept of oikonomos ===
Xenophon's Oeconomicus is one of the earliest sources to extensively discuss the management of a wealthy agrarian estate. Here, the role of the oikonomos largely concerned management of his household with the aim of accumulating and preserving wealth, rather than a relation to any modern sense of "economics". Socrates and Crito consider household management to be an art or science, and the former argues that the best oikonomos is the one who makes the best use of resources; one with an abundance of material wealth which is insufficient to satisfy his needs is functionally poorer than one with little wealth which satisfies him. In this portrayal, though Socrates figures his own property to be worth a hundredfold less than Crito's, he has enough to satisfy himself and friends who would help him if he did not; the latter has social obligations of sacrifice, patronage, entertaining guests, and financing potential wars. This leads Socrates to consider himself far wealthier than Crito. Meanwhile, Ischomachus, a "fair and good" upper-class farmer, focuses his instructions on household managing on the importance of ensuring his wife's submissiveness and of close supervision of the house, as well as on a thorough understanding of agricultural techniques. In short, Xenophon characterizes the oikonomos as holding power over children, slaves, wife, and property, along with the power to delegate authority to overseers; however, this account specifically concerns wealthy estates.

Aristotle, however, argued that the role of "master of the house" is a position of nature rather than of particular skill in household management. He disagrees with the notion that household management is synonymous with wealth acquisition, instead proposing that it is "the art which uses household stores". To the extent that there is a natural part of household management which concerns acquisition, it is limited to the provision of basic necessities. The obligation of Aristotle's oikonomos is to use and order wealth (the most essential of which are the necessities for survival which nature provides, which are presupposed) rather than to acquire it.

Nor does Aristotle believe that wealth acquisition is furthered solely by good home management, as he argues in Rhetoric that to pontificate on growing the wealth of a country, a political speaker must understand foreign and domestic affairs. Aristotle specifically objects to the sophist Alcidamas's use of oikonomos in the context of a rhetorician as "dispenser of pleasure to his audience". This was part of a repudiation of Alcidamas' tendency to use excessive metaphors and "long, unseasonable, or frequent epithets".

Aristotle also emphasizes the importance of the household in tragedies and comedies. In Poetics, he writes that the tragedian Euripides is faulty in his "oikonomia", (Note: The Poetics of Aristotle at Google Books) translated as "management" as well as (more directly) "economy", of the subject of tragedy. This is in part because the households he portrays are poorly suited to tragic plays. Meanwhile, a proper tragedy, such as those pertaining to the House of Atreus or Oedipus, must involve a family or household (oikos) which elicits pity from the audience; to this end, it must be familiar to the audience but not intimately so. The poet here is an oikonomos, responsible for the management and deliverance of his play, in addition to the presentation of the oikos which is the subject.

Hesiod presents in Works and Days instructions on household management, emphasizing the link between one's wealth-getting and his work ethic with respect to farming and keeping his house in order. Here he appears to consider a "house" to represent the sum total of all that the oikonomos owns.

== In the Seleucid Empire ==
The Seleucid Empire was divided into administrative regions known as satrapies. Hypotheses differ as to the role of the oikonomos. Some theorize that they were managers of the royal treasuries or even royal estates, which would have made them completely separate from any actual administrative role. An oikonomos may also have been a satrapy's financial director, or perhaps an accountant for tax receipts and administrative expenses. The oikonomos was probably a low-ranking figure, as accounts place them in charge of trivial local decisions and subordinate to the strategos, who functioned as governor of the satrapy. An inscription of a correspondence between two priests uncovered north of Sardis references an oikonomos named Asklepiades, and suggests that it was his duty to find and set up a location for a stele to be inscribed with the names of the priests and their initiates. Another inscription implies that oikonomoi were responsible for purchasing bulls for sacrifice at the Panegyreis.
