= Ionian League =

Ancient Greek political confederation of city-states in western Asia Minor

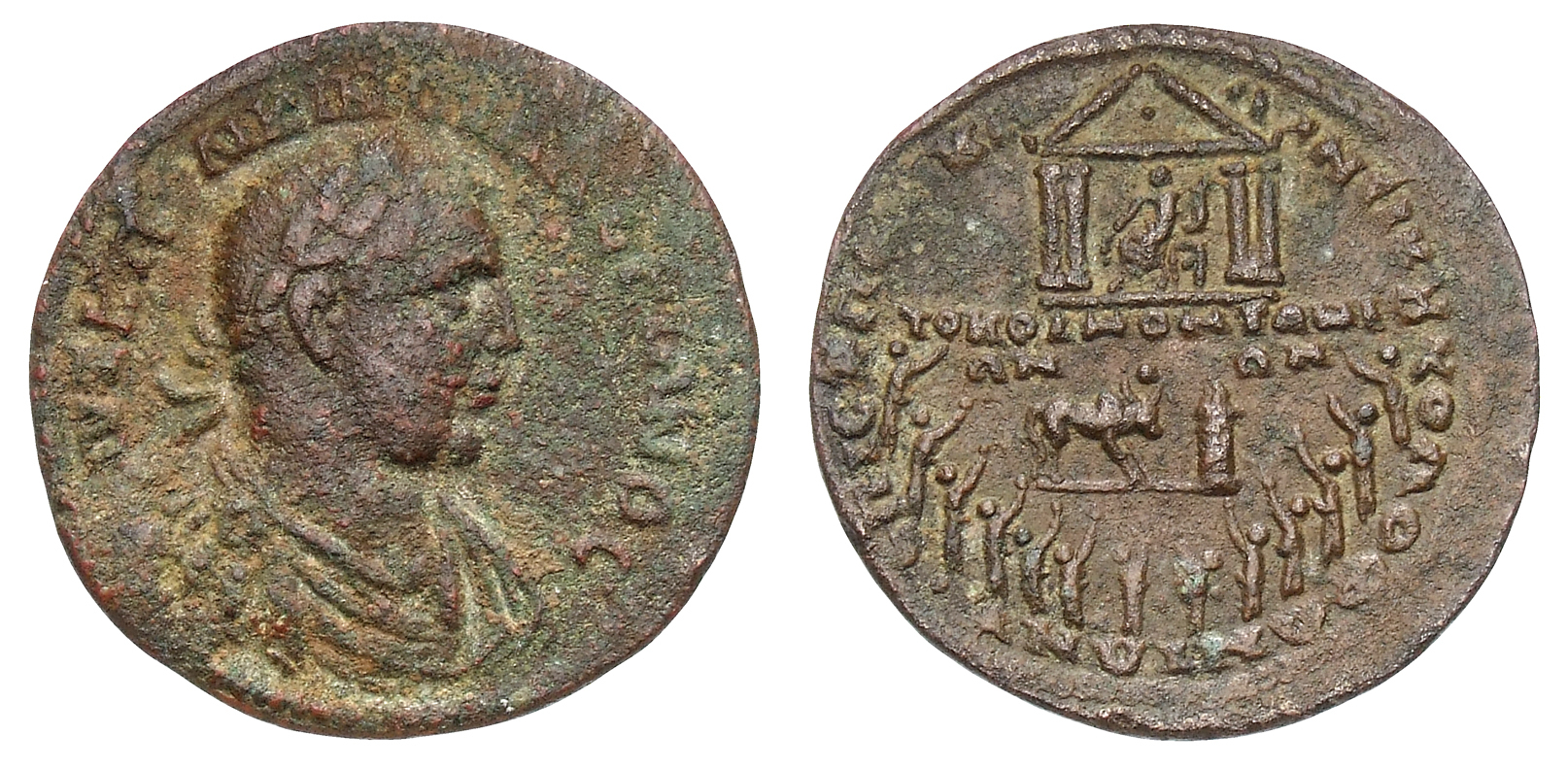
3rd-century coin of Kolophon with a representation of the gathering of the League at the temple of Apollo Klarios, and a bust of Emperor Valerian I

The Ionian League (Ancient Greek: Ἴωνες, romanized: Íōnes; κοινὸν Ἰώνων, koinón Iōnōn; or κοινὴ σύνοδος Ἰώνων, koinē sýnodos Iōnōn, in Latin: commune consilium), also called the Panionic League, was a confederation formed at the end of the Meliac War in the mid-7th century BC comprising twelve Ionian Greek city-states (a dodecapolis, of which there were many others), and eventually thirteen city-states with the admission of Smyrna. The earliest union of city-states in the area was the Ionian League. The League survived through the Hellenistic and Roman periods, until the 3rd century AD.

== Overview ==
Ancient Greek colonization: the Ionians in green

The twelve ancient city-states were listed by Herodotus as:

- Miletus, Myus, and Priene—all located in Caria (a region in Asia Minor). The three Greek cities spoke the same Ionic subdialect. Starting from the 7th century BC, Greek-Carian bilinguals in Caria suggest the Carians shared their former ancestral land amicably with the Greeks. The Carian language is not Greek but is a remnant of the Anatolian language group that dominated Anatolia before being pushed out by peoples from the Balkans. They seemed to get along well with the Greeks since the Bronze Age. Carian disappeared in the 1st century BC, suggesting their complete Hellenization by that date. They are known to have been partners of the Ionians in their sea-going business ventures.
- Ephesus, Colophon, Lebedus, Teos, Clazomenae and Phocaea—all located in Lydia and/or the region known today as Ionia (both also in Asia Minor, Lydia extending inland much farther relative to Ionia), speaking another dialect;
- Chios (island) and Erythrae (Asia Minor)—with a common dialect; and
- Samos (island)—with its own dialect.

Smyrna, an originally Aeolic city bordering the Ionians, asked for admission and entered the League at a later date, being first attested in a decree of 289/8 BC. The league is still attested as having thirteen members as late as the 3rd century AD, but this may reflect tradition more than reality, as due to synoecisms and the fluctuation in importance of the various cities, some were incorporated into others over time (e.g. Myus became part of Miletus).

One of the earliest known historical sources, the Histories of Herodotus, and early inscriptions refer to the legally constituted body customarily translated by "league" as "the Ionians" in the special sense of the cities incorporated by it. One therefore reads of the cities, council or decisions "of the Ionians." Writers and documents of the Hellenistic Period explicitly use the term koinon ("common thing") or synodos ("synod") of the Ionians, and by anachronism apply it to the early league when they mention it.

Under the Roman Empire it was allowed to issue its own coinage under the name koinon Iōnōn on one side with the face of the emperor on the other.

== Foundation ==
The Meliac War was a final settlement between the ancient state of Caria and the Ionians who had been settlers on its land at the mouth of the Maeander for some centuries. Their last stronghold was the fortified settlement of Melia at the smaller peak of Dilek Daglari on the north slopes of Mycale, where the seat of their worship of Poseidon Heliconius was located. The fort was constructed in the early 7th century BC.

Carians and Ionians had been intermarrying for generations but a Carian state persisted until a coalition of Ionian cities defeated it and divided its lands among them. In view of the rising Persian threat, they decided to continue the coalition as the Ionian League, building a new religious and political center at Melia.

Delegates (theoroi) of the league gathered to celebrate the Panionia, a religious festival and games (panegyris) dedicated to Poseidon Heliconius at the sanctuary of Poseidon called the Panionium. The Ionians (who had amalgamated with the Carians) had decided to continue the worship of Poseidon. Eventually, a new temple to the god was erected about 540 BC. (Its ruins and the location of Melia were part of the Lohmann et al. discoveries of 2004; prior to then, other theories of the location had been prevalent.)

== See also ==
- Amphictyonic League
- List of ancient Greek alliances
- Ionia (satrapy)
- Ionian Revolt
