= Glauke (Ionia) =

Ancient settlement in Ionia

- Γλαύκη (Ancient Greek)
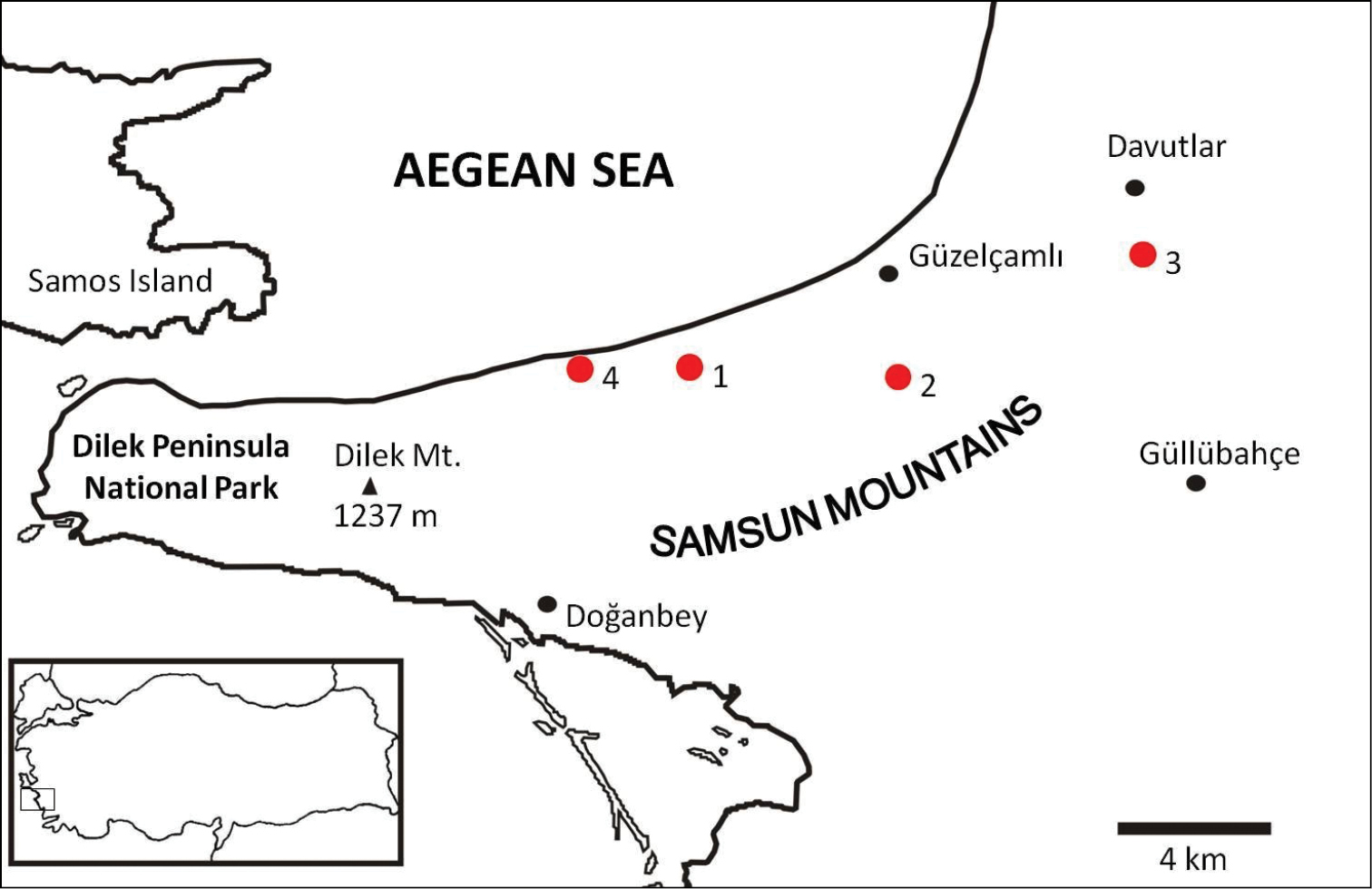

- Location within Turkey
- 37°39′39.6″N 27°0′34.6″E
- Location: Dilek Peninsula, Aydın; Turkey
- Region: Ancient Ionia

Glauke (Ancient Greek: Γλαύκη) was a town of ancient Ionia. Today, it is located in the south of Dipburnu, the westernmost tip of the Dilek Peninsula within the borders of Aydın province.
