= Adıgüzel Dam =

Dam in Denizli, Turkey

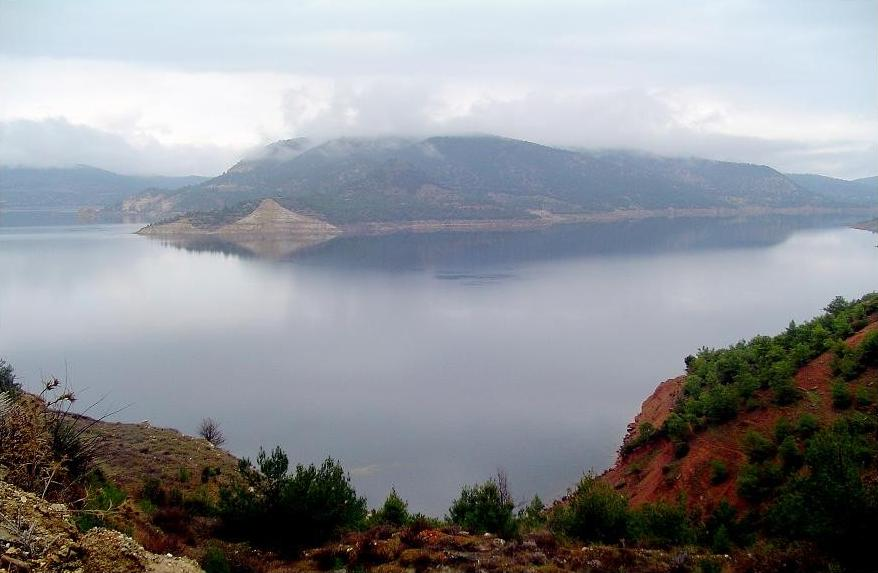
- Adıgüzel Dam Reservoir

- Location within Turkey
- Official name: Adıgüzel Baraji
- Country: Turkey
- Coordinates: 38°09′30″N 29°12′20″E
- Status: Operational
- Construction began: 1976
- Opening date: 1989

Dam and spillways
- Impounds: Büyük Menderes River
- Height: 144 m (472 ft)
- Dam volume: 7,125,000 m^{3} (9,319,148 cu yd)

Reservoir
- Total capacity: 1,076,000,000 m^{3} (872,327 acre⋅ft)
- Surface area: 26 km^{2} (10 mi^{2})

Power Station
- Turbines: 2 x 31 MW Francis-type
- Installed capacity: 62 MW
- Annual generation: 280 GWh

Adıgüzel Dam is an embankment dam on the Büyük Menderes River in Denizli Province, Turkey, built between 1976 and 1989. The dam creates a lake which is 25.9 km ² and irrigates 94,825 hectares.

== See also ==
- List of dams and reservoirs in Turkey
