= Cindere Dam =

Coordinates: 38.1155°N 29.0351°E

- Location: Turkey
- Construction began: 1994
- Opening date: 2007

Dam and spillways
- Height: 78 m (256 ft)

Reservoir
- Total capacity: 82,000,000 m^{3} (66,478 acre⋅ft)

Power Station
- Installed capacity: 29 MW
- Annual generation: 88 GWh

Cindere Dam is a gravity dam on the Büyük Menderes River in Denizli Province, Turkey. The development was backed by the Turkish State Hydraulic Works.

== See also ==
- List of dams and reservoirs in Turkey
