= Mycale Strait =

Narrow strait separating the island of Samos (Greece) from Anatolia (Turkey)

Coordinates: 37°49′11″N 27°15′51″E

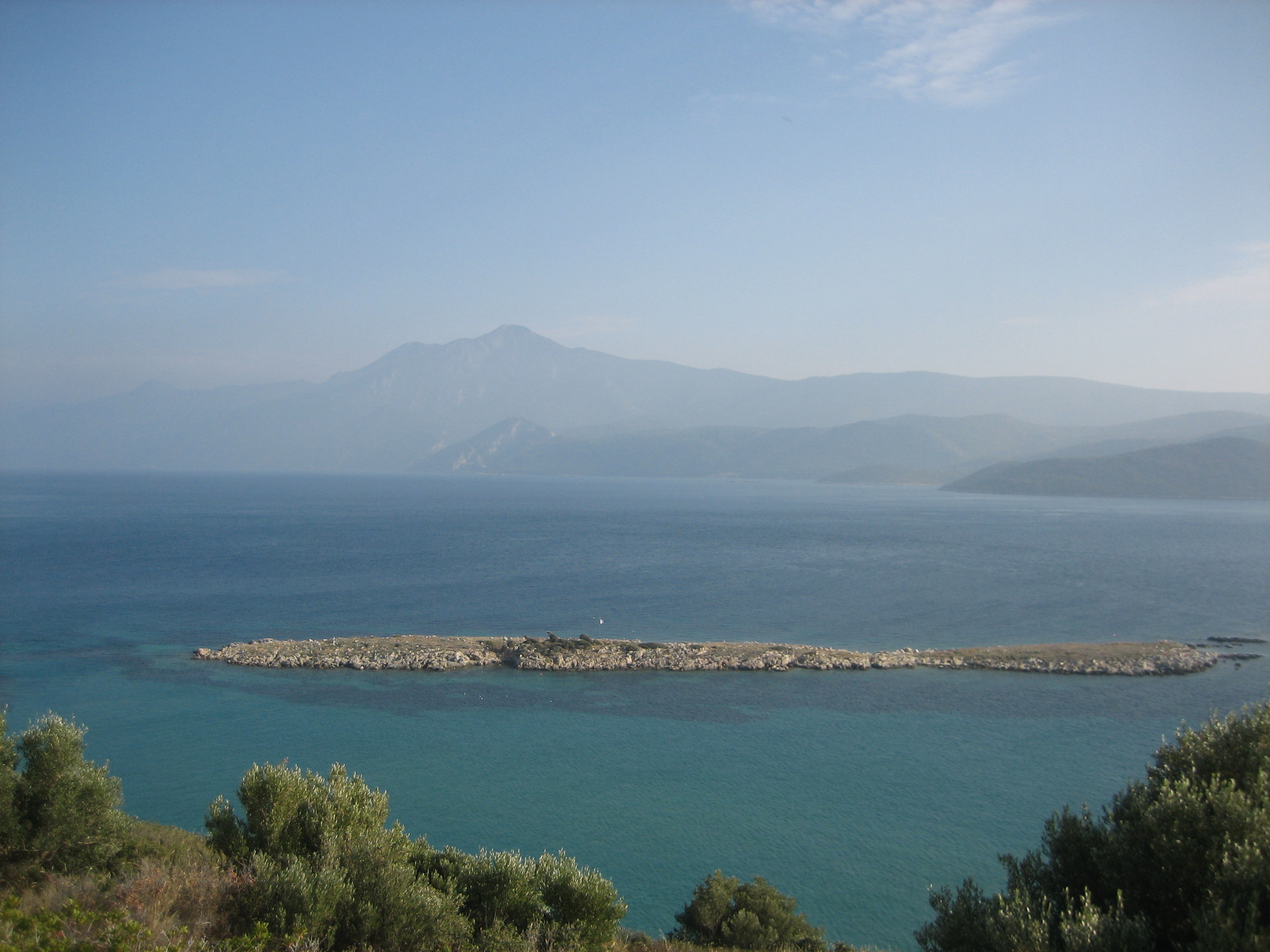
The Mycale Strait

The Mycale Strait (Greek: Στενό της Μυκάλης; Turkish: Dilek Geçidi), also known as the Samos Strait, is a narrow strait separating the island of Samos (Greece) from Anatolia (Turkey) in the eastern Aegean Sea. At its narrowest point it is only 1.6 km wide; the narrowest between any Aegean island and Turkey. It is named after the nearby Mount Mycale on the Turkish mainland. The Dilek Peninsula-Büyük Menderes Delta National Park, located in the Kuşadası district of Aydın Province, is situated along the strait.

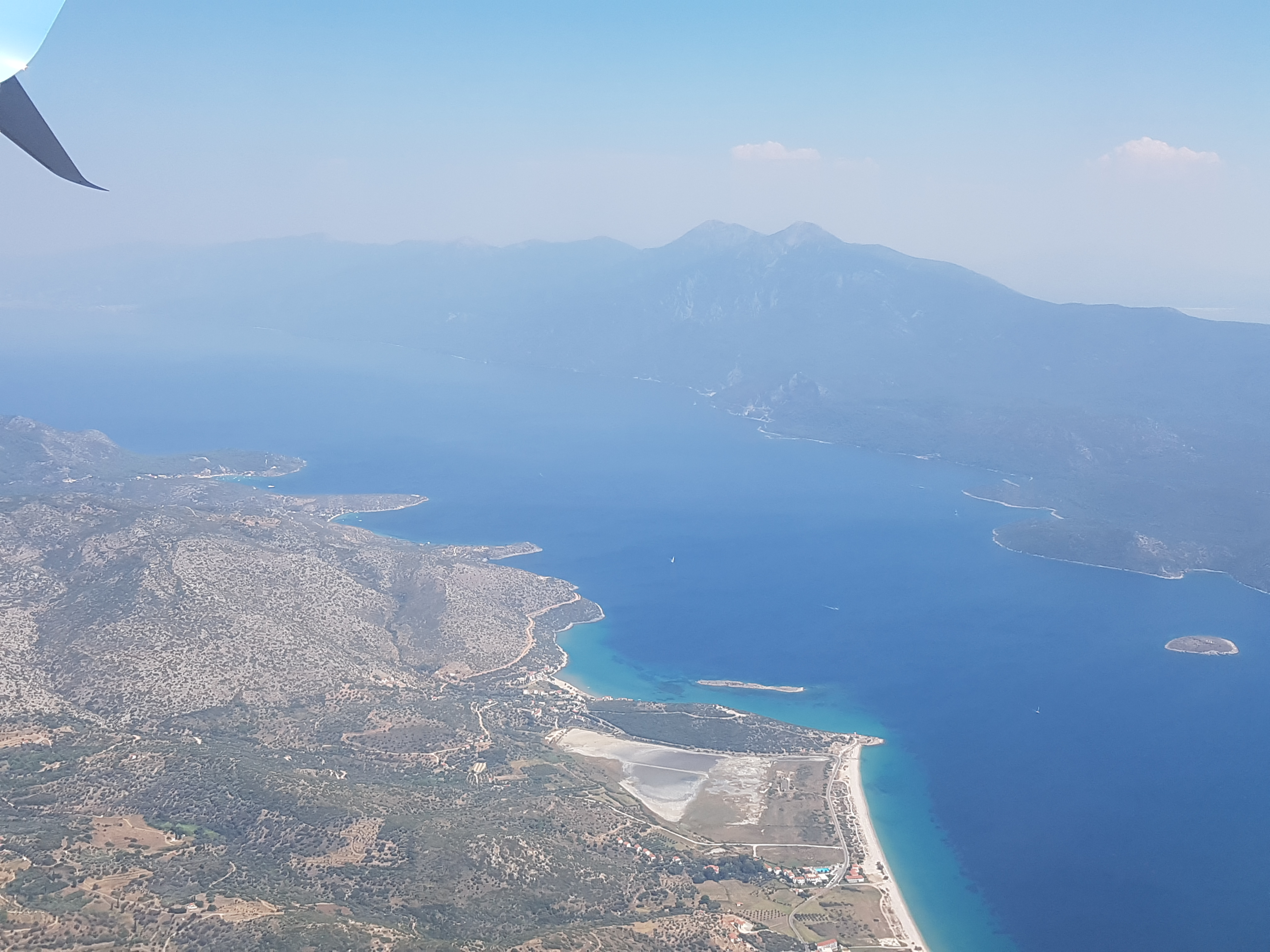
Mycale Strait from the air
