= Panionium =

Ionian sacred place

Coordinates: 37°42′46″N 27°14′06″E

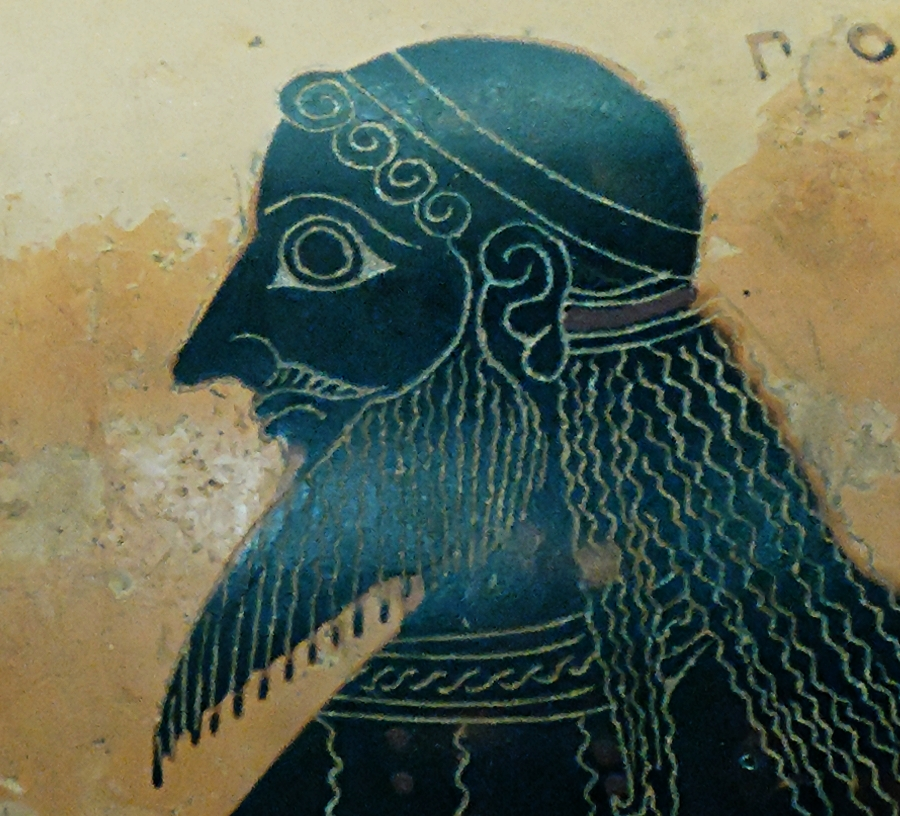
Poseidon's head (identified by an inscription), detail from a scene representing Athena and Poseidon. Side B from an Attic black-figure neck-amphora, c. 550–530 BC. From Vulci. Signed by the Amasis Painter.

The Panionium (Ancient Greek: Πανιώνιον, Paniōnion) was an Ionian sanctuary dedicated to Poseidon Helikonios and the meeting place of the Ionian League. It was on the peninsula of Mt. Mycale, about 100 kilometres (62 mi) south of Smyrna—now İzmir, in Turkey. Herodotus describes it as follows:

The Panionion is a sacred ground in Mykale, facing north; it was set apart for Poseidon of Helicon by the joint will of the Ionians. Mykale is a western promontory of the mainland opposite Samos; the Ionians used to assemble there from their cities and keep the festival to which they gave the name of Panionia.

The sanctuary was under the control of the Ionian city of Priene, one of the twelve cities comprising the Ionian League. Priene was about 15 kilometres (9 mi) away, on the opposite side of Mt. Mycale. The Prienians managed the sanctuary and presided at the sacrifices and sacred rites.

The Panionium was the site of the Ionian religious festival and games (panegyris) called the Panionia (πανιώνια). Under Persian rule, activities at the Panionium were curtailed. Writing at the end of the 5th century BC, Thucydides says that the Ionians were then celebrating their festival at Ephesus. Diodorus writes that the Ionians were forced to move the Panionia from the Panionium to Ephesus, because of war in the surrounding area. Under Alexander the Great the games and festival were again held at the Panionium, and continued to be so under Roman rule, without however, regaining their previous importance.

== Location ==
The approximate location of the Panionium is given by several ancient writers. For example, Herodotus says it is on "Mycale facing north", and Strabo says it is "after the Samian strait, near Mt. Mycale, as one sails to Ephesus ... lying three stadia above the sea". However, the exact location of the site was lost.

A potential clue to the Panionium's location was the discovery of an inscription in the area in 1673. Theodor Wiegand discovered a site at the end of the 19th century, and it was excavated in 1958 by Kleiner, Hommel and Müller-Wiener. It is located 17 km (11 mi) south of Kuşadası, near Güzelçamlı, on the north slope of Mt. Mycale, on the top of a low hill called Otomatik Tepe ("machine-gun-hill"), overlooking the sea.

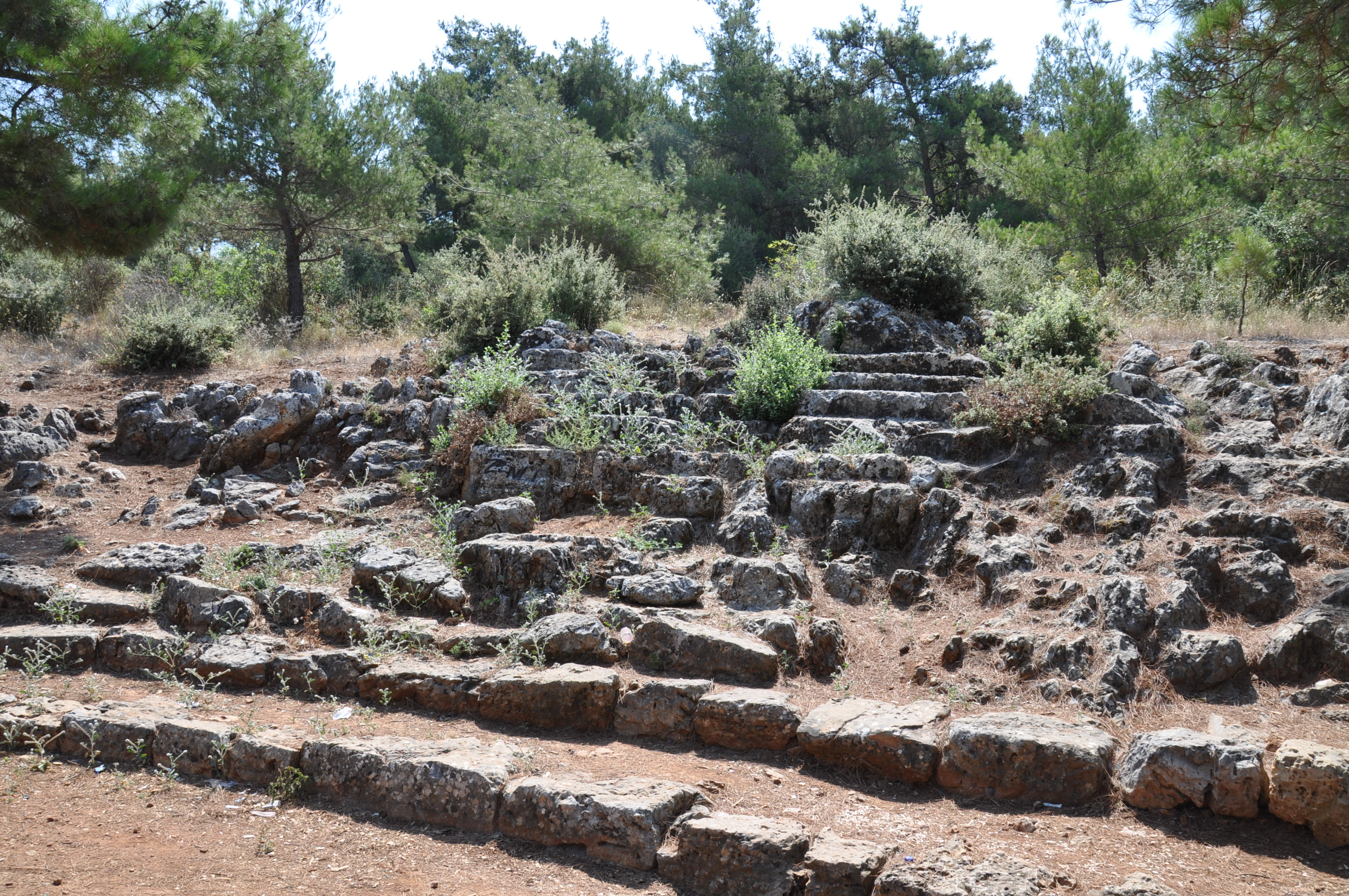
Theatre near Güzelçamlı

Wiegand's site has been for many years identified as the Panionion. It was enclosed by a temenos wall, of which one to three courses can still be seen, with an entrance from the west. In the central area can be seen evidence of a 17.5 by 4.25 m (57.4 by 13.9 ft) rectangular stone, presumed to be the altar of Poseidon, dated from the end of the 6th century BC. At the foot of the hill, 50 m (160 ft) southwest of the altar, is a small theatre or odeum. It is 32 m (105 ft) in diameter, a little bit more than semicircular, with 11 rows of seats, cut into solid rock, and is presumed to be the council chamber for the meetings of the Ionian League. It dates from the 4th century BC, when the Ionian League and the Panionia were revived. Between the sanctuary and the council chamber is a large cave, although what if any cult function it may have had is unknown. Ancient sources mention sacrifices, but no temple, and none has been found.

However, in 2004, the German archaeologist Hans Lohmann, surveying the peninsula of Mt. Mycale, discovered another archaeological site high in the mountains, a settlement and an archaic temple (about mid 6th century BC) of the Ionic order. In the summer of 2005, the temple was excavated in cooperation with the Museum of Aydın. Lohmann assumes that this site, overlooking most of the Ionian region, has to be identified as the Panionion, if only because it agrees better with the written sources.
