= Büyük Menderes River =

River in Turkey

Büyük Menderes River Maeander, Meander, Μαίανδρος
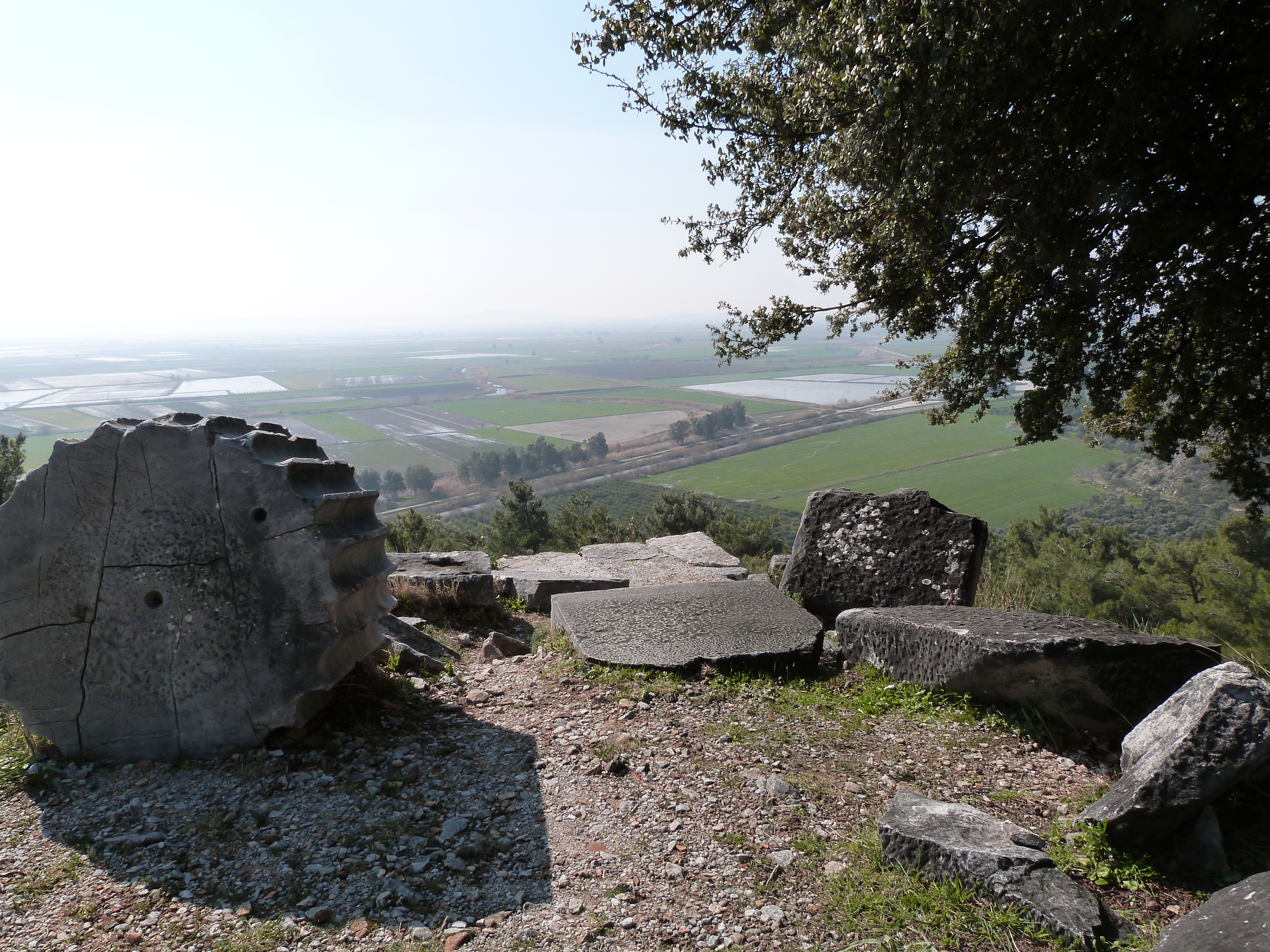
- Native name: Büyük Menderes Irmağı (Turkish)

Location
- Country: Turkey
- Cities: Nazilli, Aydın, Söke

Physical characteristics
- Source
  - location: Dinar, Afyonkarahisar Province
  - coordinates: 38°04′15″N 30°10′37″E
  - elevation: 880 m (2,890 ft)
- Mouth: Aegean Sea
  - location: Aydin Province
  - coordinates: 37°32′24″N 27°10′08″E
  - elevation: 0 m (0 ft)
- Length: 548 km (341 mi)
- Basin size: 25,000 km^{2} (9,700 sq mi)

Basin features
- Tributaries
  - left: Çürüksu River, Akçay River, Çine River

The Büyük Menderes River ("Great Meander", historically the Maeander or Meander, from Ancient Greek: Μαίανδρος, Maíandros; Turkish: Büyük Menderes Irmağı), is a river in southwestern Turkey. It rises in west central Turkey near Dinar before flowing west through the Büyük Menderes graben until reaching the Aegean Sea in the proximity of the ancient Ionian city Miletus. The river was well known for its sinuous, curving pattern, and gives its name to the common term, (meander), used to describe these characteristic bends in rivers.

== Modern geography ==
The river rises in a spring near Dinar and flows to Lake Işıklı. After passing the Adıgüzel Dam and the Cindere Dam, the river flows past Nazilli, Aydın and Söke before it drains into the Aegean Sea.

== Ancient geography ==
The Maeander was a celebrated river of Caria in Asia Minor. It appears earliest in the Catalog of Trojans of Homer's Iliad along with Miletus and Mycale.

=== Sources ===
The river has its sources not far from Celaenae in Phrygia (now Dinar), where it gushed forth in a park of Cyrus. According to some its sources were the same as those of the river Marsyas; but this is irreconcilable with Xenophon, according to whom the sources of the two rivers were only near each other, the Marsyas rising in a royal palace. Others state that the Maeander flowed out of a lake on Mount Aulocrene. William Martin Leake reconciles all these apparently different statements by the remark that both the Maeander and the Marsyas have their origin in the lake on Mount Aulocrene, above Celaenae, but that the issue at different parts of the mountain below the lake.

=== Course ===
Map of the river's mouth and the evolution of silting of Miletus Bay during Antiquity.

The Maeander was so celebrated in antiquity for its numerous windings, that its classical name "Maeander" became, and still is, proverbial. Its whole course has a southwesterly direction on the south of the range of Mount Messogis. South of Tripolis it receives the waters of the Lycus, whereby it becomes a river of some importance. Near Carura it passes from Phrygia into Caria, where it flows in its tortuous course through the Maeandrian plain, and finally discharges itself in the Gulf of Icaros (an arm of the Aegean Sea), between the ancient Greek cities Priene and Myus, opposite to the Ionian city of Miletus, from which its mouth is only 10 stadia distant.

=== Tributaries ===
The tributaries of the Maeander include the Orgyas, Marsyas, Cludrus, Lethaeus, and Gaeson, in the north; and the Obrimas, Lycus, Harpasus, and a second Marsyas in the south.

=== Physical description ===
The Maeander is a deep river, but not very broad. In many parts its depth equals its breadth and, so, it is navigable only by small craft. It frequently overflows its banks and, as a result of the quantity of mud it deposits at its mouth, the coast has been pushed about 20 or 30 stadia (about 4 to 6 kilometers in modern units) further into the sea and several small islands off the coast have become united with the mainland.

=== Mythology ===
The associated river god was also called Meander, one of the sons of Oceanus and Tethys.

There was a legend about a subterranean connection between the Maeander and the Alpheus River in Elis.

== See also ==
- Küçük Menderes
- Battle of the Meander
