= Panegyris =

Ancient Greek assembly

A panegyris (Ancient Greek: πανήγυρις "gathering"), is an Ancient Greek general, national or religious assembly. Each was dedicated to the worship of a particular god. It is also associated with saint days and holy festivals. Panegyris is used in three ways: A meeting of the inhabitants from one town and its vicinity, a meeting of inhabitants of an entire province, district, or of people belonging to a particular tribe, and for national meetings. The panegyreis were festivals in which prayers were made, sacrifices offered, and also processions.

== Relation to panegyry and panegyric ==
Πανήγυρις is also transliterated as panegyry, and in turn, some sources define panegyry to be a panegyric. A panegyric is a formal public speech. This could be a separate usage of panegyry, an obsolete usage, or simply an error.
