= Antimachus (disambiguation) =

Antimachus of Colophon or Claros was an ancient Greek poet.

Antimachus may also refer to:

- Antimachus of Teos, ancient Greek epic poet
- Antimachus of Heliopolis, ancient Greek poet
- Antimachus (sculptor)
- Antimachus I, Graeco-Bactrian king
- Antimachus II, Graeco-Bactrian king
- Antimachus (mythology), several figures in Greek mythology
