= Oroanna =

Town of ancient Ionia

Coordinates: 38°11′52″N 27°08′45″E

Oroanna was a town of ancient Ionia. Its name does not appear among ancient authors, but is inferred from epigraphic and other evidence.

Its site is located north of ancient Colophon, Asiatic Turkey.
