= Epigoni (epic) =

Lost epic poem

Epigoni (Ancient Greek: Ἐπίγονοι, Epigonoi, "Progeny") was an early Greek epic, a sequel to the Thebaid and therefore grouped in the Theban cycle. Some ancient authors seem to have considered it a part of the Thebaid and not a separate poem.

== Contents ==
According to one source, the epic extended to 7,000 lines of verse. It told the story of the last battle for Thebes by the Epigoni, the children of the heroes who had previously fought for the city. Only the first line is now known:

Now, Muses, let us begin to sing of younger men ...

Additional references, without verbal quotations, suggest that the myth of the death of Procris and the story of Teiresias's daughter Manto formed part of the Epigoni.

The epic was sometimes ascribed to Homer, but Herodotus doubted this attribution. According to the Scholia on Aristophanes there was an alternative attribution to "Antimachus." This presumably means Antimachus of Teos (8th century BC), and for this reason another verse line attributed without title to Antimachus of Teos is conjecturally thought to belong to the Epigoni. An alternative explanation for the naming of Antimachus here would be that the later epic poet Antimachus of Colophon (4th century BC) had been accused of stealing the traditional Epigoni by incorporating its plot in his literary epic Thebais.

The story of the Epigoni was afterwards told again in the form of a tragedy by Sophocles, Epigoni, and in a now-lost play of the same name by Sophocles's contemporary, Astydamas.

== Select editions and translations ==
=== Critical editions ===
- Kinkel, G. (1877), [Epicorum Graecorum fragmenta], vol. 1, Leipzig.
- Allen, T.W. (1912), Homeri opera. Tomus V: Hymni, Cyclus, Fragmenta, Margites, Batrachomyomachia, Vitae, Oxford, ISBN 0-19-814534-9.
- Bernabé, A. (1988), Poetae epici Graecae, vol. pars i, Leipzig, ISBN 978-3-598-71706-2.
- Davies, M. (1988), Epicorum Graecorum fragmenta, Göttingen, ISBN 978-3-525-25747-0.

=== Translations ===
- Evelyn-White, H.G. (1936), [Hesiod, the Homeric Hymns, and Homerica], Loeb Classical Library (3rd rev. ed.), Cambridge, Massachusetts, ISBN 978-0-674-99063-0. (The link is to the 1st edition of 1914.) English translation with facing Greek text; now obsolete except for its translations of the ancient quotations.
- West, M.L. (2003), Greek Epic Fragments, Loeb Classical Library, Cambridge, Massachusetts, ISBN 978-0-674-99605-2. Greek text with facing English translation

== Bibliography ==
- Davies, M. (1989), Greek Epic Cycle, London, ISBN 978-1853990397.
