= Gerriadai =

Town of ancient Ionia

Coordinates: 38°11′45″N 26°47′19″E

Gerriadai was a town of ancient Ionia, near Teos.

Its site is located near the modern Sığacık Liman, Asiatic Turkey.
