= Theban Cycle =

Literary work

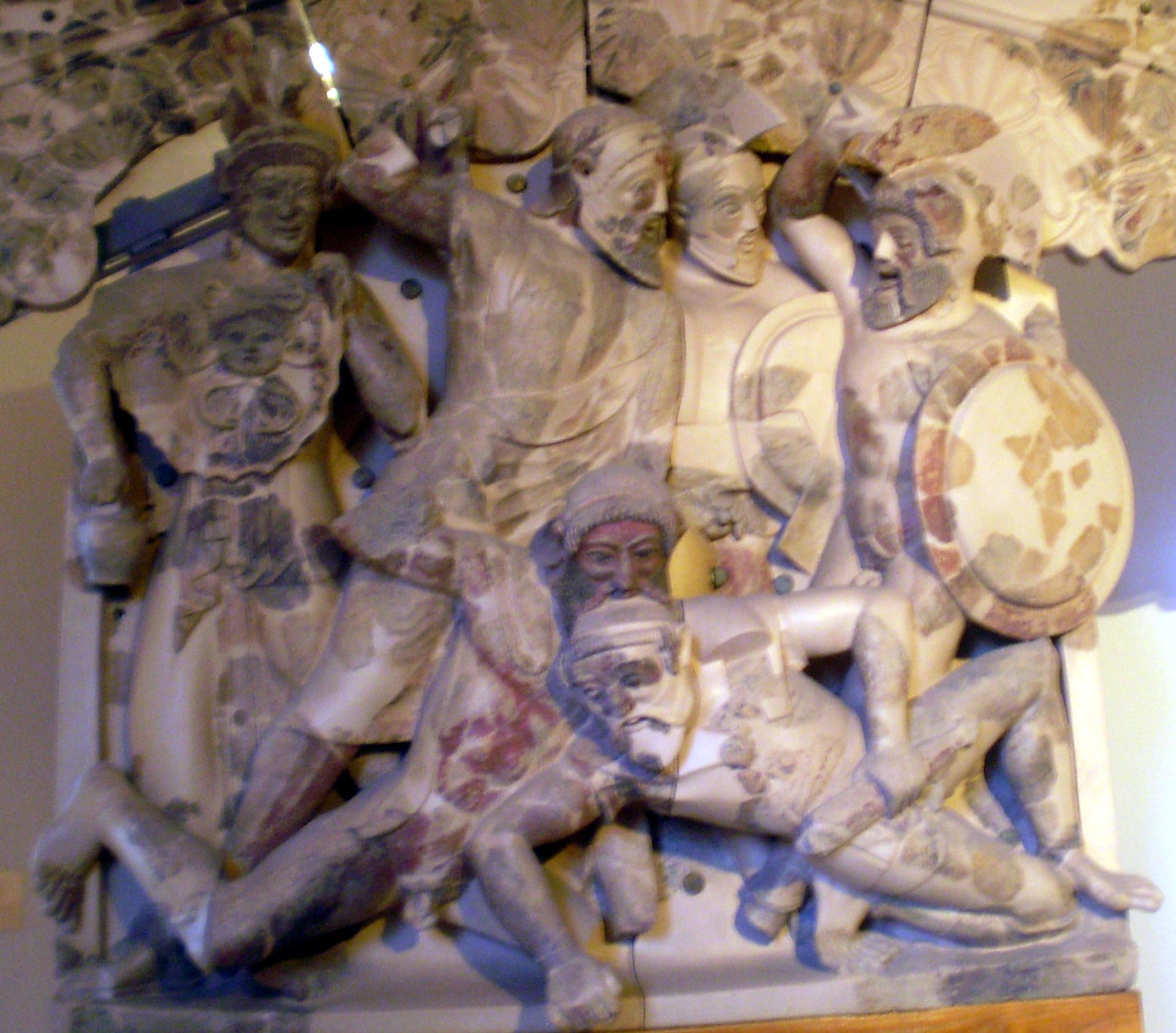
Detail of clay group with mythological scene from the Theban cycle, from the area of temple A at Pyrgi, mid-fifth century BC.

The Theban Cycle (Greek: Θηβαϊκὸς Κύκλος) is a collection of four lost epics of ancient Greek literature which tells the mythological history of the Boeotian city of Thebes. They were composed in dactylic hexameter verse and believed to be recorded between 750 and 500 BC. The epics took place before the Trojan War and centered around the Theban royal family.

The epics of the Theban Cycle were the Oedipodea, the Thebaid, the Epigoni, and the Alcmeonis.

== Overview ==
In the collection, the precise sequence of events and the handling of characters and plots are difficult to reconstruct. There are very few fragments for the Oedipodea. For the Epigoni there are less than ten fragments and only three verbatim fragments totaling four lines. In addition, unlike the poetry of the Trojan cycle, there is no prose summary.

- The Oedipodea: There are a total of 6,600 verses, which different sources attribute to Cinaethon of Sparta. It is treated as the opening poem of the Theban Cycle.
- The Thebaid: contains 7,000 verses, also known as Thebais or the Cyclic Thebaid. It is an ancient Greek epic whose author's true identity cannot be determined. Ancient Greek elegiac poet Callinus believed that Homer was the author of the epic, and this statement is widely recognized.
- The Epigoni: consists of 7,000 lines of verse. Some scholars believe that it is a sort of sequel to the Thebais. The poem has been attributed to Homer, but some scholars doubt this attribution. The work has also been attributed to Antimachus of Teos. There are many unresolved issues concerning the poem's origin, age, and arrangement, as well as its relationship to other epics (Thebaid, Alcmeonis, Trojan) that are now lost.
- The Alcmeonis: It is the fourth epic in the Theban Cycle, and the one about which we know the least. Its verses, who wrote it, and even when it was written are unknown.

== Plot summary ==
=== Oedipodea ===
The small fragments of the Oedipodea that survive reveal it is a story related to Oedipus and the Sphinx. A better known and well preserved version of this story is told by the Athenian tragic poet Sophocles in his play Oedipus Rex. However, there are noteworthy differences between the two works.

One of the two fragments of Oedipodeia mentions the sphinx, describing it as a force that "devours great and small". This differs from Sophocles' sphinx, which simply guards the entrance to Thebes and devours anyone who is unable to answer its riddle.

Another fragment points out that while Oedipus did unknowingly have an incestuous relationship with his mother Epicaste/Jocasta like in Sophocles' play, his children were from another marriage.

There are certainly other differences between the two works as well, but no other fragments survive. As a result, it is difficult to know more about the Oedipodea.

=== Thebaid ===
It records the quarrel between the brothers Eteocles and Polynices, sons of Oedipus, which led to the war of the Seven against Thebes.

After Oedipus gave up the throne of Thebes, his sons Eteocles and Polynices reached an agreement on how to divide their inheritance from their father. Polynices took possession of the material property while Eteocles claimed the title of the royal family.

Later, the exiled Polynices and Tydeus arrive at Argos. Adrastus, king of Argos, provides troops to help Polynices regain the throne of Thebes. However, Polynices and his six commanders fail in their attack on Thebes. At the end of the poem, both Eteocles and Polynices are killed.

=== Epigoni ===
The Epigoni is a sequel to the Thebaid. Presumably it told the story of a second expedition to Thebes, led by the sons of the Seven, 10 years after the original expedition. In this story, the sons of the seven warriors capture the city and destroy it.

There is only an extremely limited fragment of the poem. In fact, only the first line is known: "But now, Muses, let us begin on the younger men."

=== Alcmeonis ===
Only seven records of Alcmeonis are found in ancient literature. It tells the story of Alcmaeon killing his mother, Eriphyle, because she arranged for the death of his father Amphiaraus, whose murder is told in Thebaid.

There is debate about whether to include the Alcmeonis in the epic cycle. However, Alcmaeon is an outstanding figure within the Theban saga. He is the son of Amphiaraus, one of the seven commanders who failed in the first campaign against Thebes, and he is one of the Epigonoi (the sons of the seven) who destroyed Thebes in the second campaign.

== Significance and influence ==
The collection of four lost epics along with other ancient Greek literature influenced later literary creations.

One well-known example is the Theban plays of Sophocles. The plot of Oedipus Rex may have been influenced by the Oedipodea. Sophocles also wrote another tragedy, Epigoni. Unfortunately, the script has been lost and only a few fragments remain.

The Thebaid was probably the basis for a later Latin epic poem of the same title which describes the struggle of Polynices and Eteocles for the throne of Thebes. Despite being criticized as rather exaggerated, it was popular in the Middle Ages and Renaissance and promoted further literary creation.

== Dramatic adaptations ==
The epics of the Theban Cycle were converted into plays by ancient Greek dramatists, and those plays are still being performed today. One example is Theban Cycle (2002) presented by the Düsseldorf Schauspielhaus. It is a production of four interconnected Greek plays: The Bacchae by Euripides, Oedipus Rex by Sophocles, Seven Against Thebes by Aeschylus, and Antigone by Sophocles.

== Select editions and translations ==
=== Critical editions ===
- Kinkel, G. (1877), Epicorum Graecorum fragmenta, vol. 1, Leipzig.
- Allen, T.W. (1912), Homeri opera. Tomus V: Hymni, Cyclus, Fragmenta, Margites, Batrachomyomachia, Vitae, Oxford, ISBN 0-19-814534-9.
- Bernabé, A. (1988), Poetae epici Graecae, vol. pars i, Leipzig, ISBN 978-3-598-71706-2.
- Davies, M. (1988), Epicorum Graecorum fragmenta, Göttingen, ISBN 978-3-525-25747-0.

=== Translations ===
- West, M.L. (2003), Greek Epic Fragments, Loeb Classical Library, Cambridge, MA, ISBN 978-0-674-99605-2. Greek text with facing English translation

== Bibliography ==
- Baumann, R. (n.d.). Photios, Bibliotheca, 239: Proclus' "Grammatical Chrestomathy". Retrieved December 18, 2020, from https://ryanfb.github.io/photios-bibliotheca/239
- Cingano, E. (2015). Epigonoi. In M. Fantuzzi & C. Tsagalis (Eds.), The Greek Epic Cycle and its Ancient Reception: A Companion (pp. 244–260). Cambridge: Cambridge University Press. doi:10.1017/CBO9780511998409.016
- Cingano, E. (2015). Oedipodea. In M. Fantuzzi & C. Tsagalis (Eds.), The Greek Epic Cycle and its Ancient Reception: A Companion (pp. 213–225). Cambridge: Cambridge University Press. doi:10.1017/CBO9780511998409.014
- Debiasi, A. (2015). Alcmeonis. In M. Fantuzzi & C. Tsagalis (Eds.), The Greek Epic Cycle and its Ancient Reception: A Companion (pp. 261–280). Cambridge: Cambridge University Press. doi:10.1017/CBO9780511998409.017
- Jeffrey Henderson. (2003, January 1). Greek Epic Fragments. The Theban Cycle. Retrieved December 18, 2020, from https://www.loebclassics.com/search?q=theban+cycle
- Malcolm, D. (2015). The Theban Epics. Chapter 4. Epigoni. Hellenic Studies Series 69. Washington, DC: Center for Hellenic Studies. Retrieved December 18, 2020, from https://chs.harvard.edu/CHS/article/display/5910.4-epigoni\
- The Editors of Encyclopaedia Britannica. (2020, February 1). Statius. Retrieved December 18, 2020, from https://www.britannica.com/biography/Statius
- Torres-Guerra, J. (2015). Thebaid. In M. Fantuzzi & C. Tsagalis (Eds.), The Greek Epic Cycle and its Ancient Reception: A Companion (pp. 226–243). Cambridge: Cambridge University Press. doi:10.1017/CBO9780511998409.015
- West, M.L. (2003), Greek Epic Fragments, Loeb Classical Library, no. 497, Cambridge, MA, ISBN 978-0-674-99605-2.
