= Alcmeonis =

Lost early Greek epic

The Alcmeonis (Ancient Greek: Ἀλκμεωνίς, Alkmeonis, or Ancient Greek: Ἀλκμαιωνίς, Alkmaiōnis) is a lost early Greek epic which is sometimes considered to have formed part of the Theban cycle. There are only seven references to the Alcmeonis in ancient literature, and all of them make it clear that the authorship of the epic was unknown, but it is believed to have been composed in Corinth sometime after 600 BC. It told the story of Alcmaeon's killing of his mother Eriphyle for having arranged the death of his father Amphiaraus, whose murder was narrated in the Thebaid. One of the surviving fragments is quoted by Athenaeus in the Deipnosophistae: he chose it because it describes a funeral banquet. The lines have very little in common with descriptions of feasts in the Iliad and Odyssey.

== Works that mention the Alcmeonis ==
Pseudo-Apollodorus. The Library: in Two Volumes. Trans. James George Frazer. Cambridge: Harvard University Press, 1976.

== Select editions and translations ==
=== Critical editions ===
- Kinkel, G. (1877), Epicorum Graecorum fragmenta, vol. 1, Leipzig.
- Allen, T.W. (1912), Homeri opera. Tomus V: Hymni, Cyclus, Fragmenta, Margites, Batrachomyomachia, Vitae, Oxford, ISBN 0-19-814534-9.
- Bernabé, A. (1988), Poetae epici Graecae, vol. pars i, Leipzig, ISBN 978-3-598-71706-2.
- Davies, M. (1988), Epicorum Graecorum fragmenta, Göttingen, ISBN 978-3-525-25747-0.

=== Translations ===
- Evelyn-White, H.G. (1936), Hesiod, the Homeric Hymns, and Homerica, Loeb Classical Library (3rd rev. ed.), Cambridge, MA, ISBN 978-0-674-99063-0. (The link is to the 1st edition of 1914.) English translation with facing Greek text; now obsolete except for its translations of the ancient quotations.
- West, M.L. (2003), Greek Epic Fragments, Loeb Classical Library, Cambridge, MA, ISBN 978-0-674-99605-2. Greek text with facing English translation

== Bibliography ==
- Davies, M. (1989), Greek Epic Cycle, London, ISBN 978-1853990397.
