= Mimnermus =

Ancient Greek poet (fl. 632–629 BC)

Mimnermus (Ancient Greek: Μίμνερμος Mímnermos) was a Greek elegiac poet from either Colophon or Smyrna in Ionia, who flourished about 632–629 BC (i.e. in the 37th Olympiad, according to Suda). He was strongly influenced by Homer, yet he wrote short poems suitable for performance at drinking parties and was remembered by ancient authorities chiefly as a love poet. Mimnermus in turn exerted a strong influence on Hellenistic poets such as Callimachus and thus also on Roman poets such as Propertius, who even preferred him to Homer for his eloquence on love themes (see Comments by other poets below).

His work was collected by Alexandrian scholars in just two "books" (relatively few compared for example with the twenty-six books for Stesichorus) and today only small fragments survive. The fragments confirm the ancient estimate of him as a "consummate poet" but also indicate that he was a "sturdier character" than the indulgent love poet he was assumed to be by various ancient commentators. Almost no reliable biographical details have been recorded. One ancient account linked him romantically with a flute girl who subsequently gave her name, Nanno, to one of his two books.

== Life and work ==
The Byzantine encyclopaedia Suda provides a good example of the biographical uncertainties.

Mimnermus, son of Ligyrtyades, from Colophon or Smyrna or Astypalaea, an elegiac poet. He flourished in the 37th Olympiad (632–29 BC) and so is earlier than the seven sages, although some say that he was their contemporary. He was also called Ligyaistades because of his harmonious clarity. He wrote ... books.

The gap indicates a corruption in the text and the original wording probably testified to two books, though the only source we have for this number was the grammarian Pomponius Porphyrion. The Suda's mention of Astypalaea, an island in the southern Aegean, as a possible candidate for the poet's home town is mere fantasy. Smyrna seems to be the most likely candidate. The nickname Ligyaistades was probably taken by the Suda from an elegy addressed to Mimnermus by one of the seven sages—the Athenian lawgiver and elegiac poet, Solon (see Comments by other poets). Solon clearly admired the skills of the older poet, whom he addressed as Ligyaistades, yet he objected to his hedonism and singled out this couplet for criticism:

αἲ γὰρ ἄτερ νούσων τε καὶ ἀργαλέων μελεδωνέων

ἑξηκονταέτη μοῖρα κίχοι θανάτου.

Would that my fated death might come at sixty, unattended by sickness and grievous cares.

Solon thought he should be willing to live to eighty. Plutarch was another ancient author critical of the poet's self-indulgence, dismissing one poem (see Fragment 1 in Poetic style below) as "the utterances of intemperate people." Mimnermus however was not timid in his hedonism, as indicated by a couplet attributed to him in the Palatine Anthology, an exhortation to others to live intemperately: "Enjoy yourself. Some of the harsh citizens will speak ill of you, some better.". However, the same lines have also been attributed to Theognis. A robust side to his personality is shown by his versatility as a poet. Archaic elegy was often used for patriotic purposes, to screw courage to the sticking place in times of war and to celebrate national achievements, and there is ample evidence that Mimnermus assumed this role as a poet. A quote recorded by the geographer Strabo represents the earliest surviving account of the Ionian migration, celebrating the settlement of Colophon and Smyrna from Pylos, while another quotation, recorded by Stobaeus, describes the heroic exploits of a Greek warrior against the cavalry of the Lydian king, Gyges, early in the 7th century—Mimnermus evidently hoped thereby to strengthen his countrymen's resolve against further Lydian encroachments. The name "Mimnermus" might have been chosen by his parents to commemorate a famous Smyrnean victory against Gyges near the Hermus river (and yet names ending in -ermus were quite common in Ionia). He was alive when Smyrna was besieged for the final time by the Lydians under Alyattes of Lydia and possibly he died with the town. The disappearance of Smyrna for the next three hundred years might be the reason why Colophon was able to claim the poet as one of its own, yet Smyrna's own claim persisted and this suggests that its claim had the advantage of being true.

Smyrna lay near Mount Sipylos, one of whose rocky outcrops was traditionally imagined to be the tragic figure Niobe. Like other archaic poets, Mimnermus adapted myths to his own artistic needs and Aelian recorded that he attributed twenty children to Niobe, unlike Homer, for example, who attributed twelve to her. According to Sallustius, Mimnermus was just as creative in his poetical account of Ismene, representing her as being killed by Tydeus at the command of the goddess, Athena, in the very act of making love to Theoclymenus—an original account that was soon accepted by an international audience, being represented on an early Corinthian amphora (pictured below). Imaginative accounts of the sun, voyaging at night from west to east in a golden bed, and of Jason the Argonaut voyaging to "Aeetes' city, where the rays of the swift Sun lie in a golden storeroom at the edge of Oceanus", survive in brief quotes by ancient authors. According to Strabo, Smyrna was named after an Amazon and, according to a manuscript on proverbs, Mimnermus once composed on the theme of the proverb "A lame man makes the best lover", illustrating the Amazonian practice of maiming their men.

Mimnermus was one of several ancient Greek poets who composed verses about solar eclipses, and there was a total solar eclipse of his home town, Smyrna, on April 6, 648 BC. His poetry survives only as a few fragments yet they afford us a glimpse of his "brilliantly vivid" style.

== Nanno ==
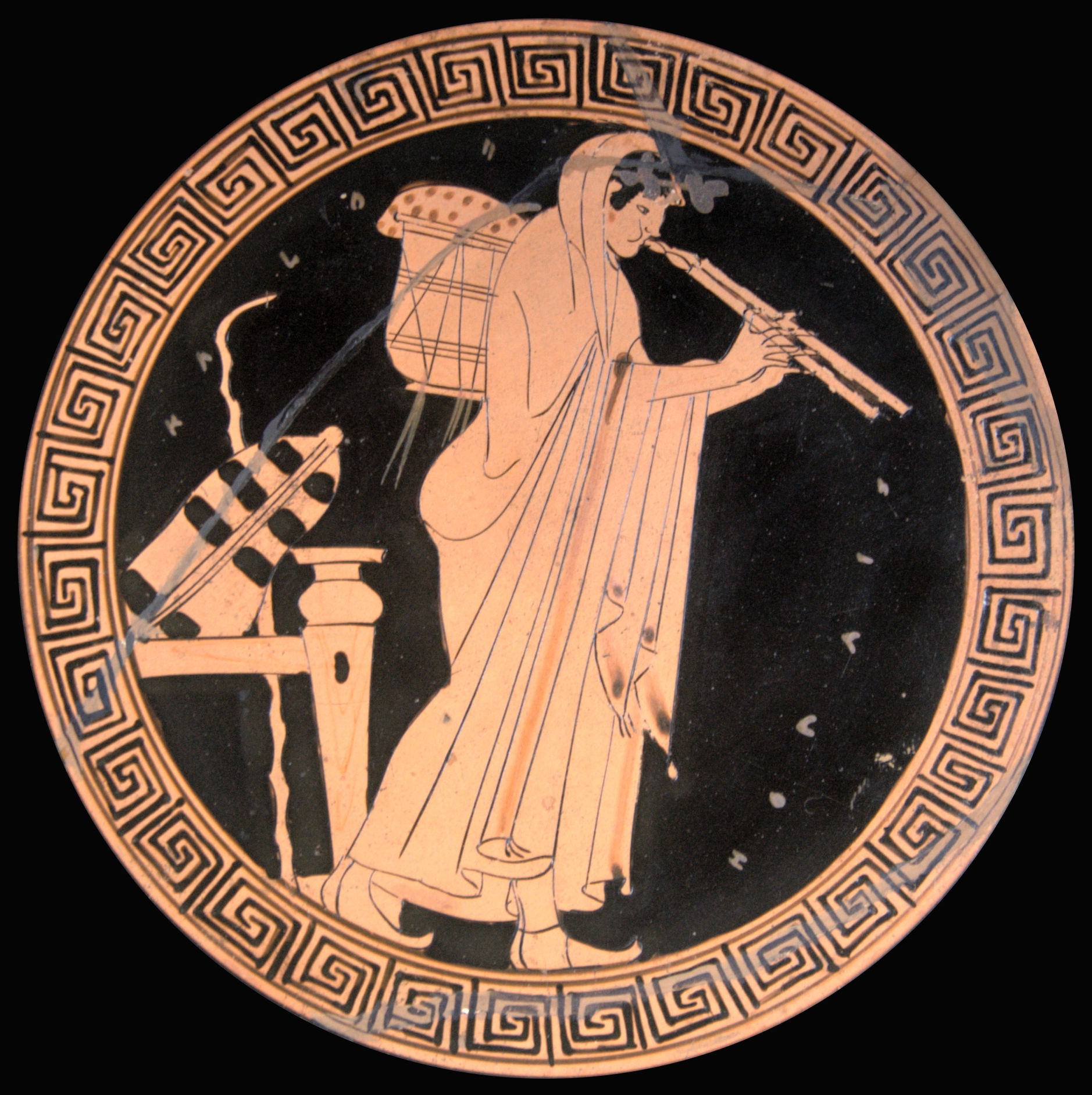
The aulos was an instrument that might accompany the singing of elegies (Brygos Painter, Attic red-figured kylix, ca. 490 BC)

Unlike epic and lyric verse, which were accompanied by stringed instruments (the cithara and barbiton respectively), elegy was accompanied by a wind instrument (the aulos) and its performance therefore required at least two people—one to sing and one to play. Ancient accounts associate Mimnermus with a female aulos player, Nanno (Ναννώ), and one makes him her lover (see quote from Hermesianax in Comments by other poets below). Another ancient source indicates that Mimnermus was a pederast, which is consistent with conventional sexual themes in Greek elegy. However, as noted by Martin Litchfield West, Mimnermus could have been a pederast and yet still have composed elegies about his love for Nanno: "Greek pederasty ... was for the most part a substitute for heterosexual love, free contacts between the sexes being restricted by society." Mimnermus apparently was also capable of playing all by himself—Strabo described him as "both a pipe-player and an elegiac poet". According to the poet Hipponax, Mimnermus when piping used the melancholy "fig-branch strain," apparently a traditional melody played while scapegoats were ritually driven from town, whipped with fig branches.

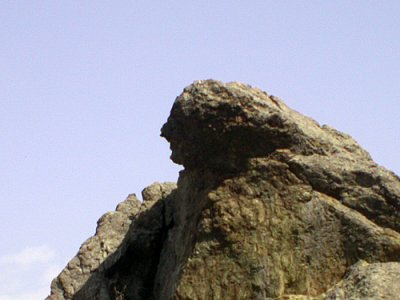
Weeping Stone, Mount Sipylos—associated with the tragic figure of Niobe.

Ancient commentators sometimes refer to a work called Nanno and there is one clear reference to a work called Smyrneis. Modern scholars have concluded that these could be the two books mentioned by Porphyrion. The Nanno appears to have been a collection of short poems on a variety of themes (not just love), whereas the Smyrneis appears to have been a quasi-epic about Smyrna's confrontation with the Lydians. A cryptic comment by the Hellenistic poet Callimachus (see Comments by other poets below) also seems to refer to those two books, commending one for "sweetness" and distinguishing it from "the great lady". The latter seems to be a reference to Smyrneis, whereas the sweet verses—apparently the slender, economical kind of verses on which Callimachus modelled his own poetry—appear to refer to Nanno. However, the comment is preserved as an incomplete fragment and modern scholars are not unanimous in their interpretation of it. Another Callimachus fragment has been interpreted as proof that Mimnermus composed some iambic verse but this conjecture has also been disputed.

== Poetic style ==
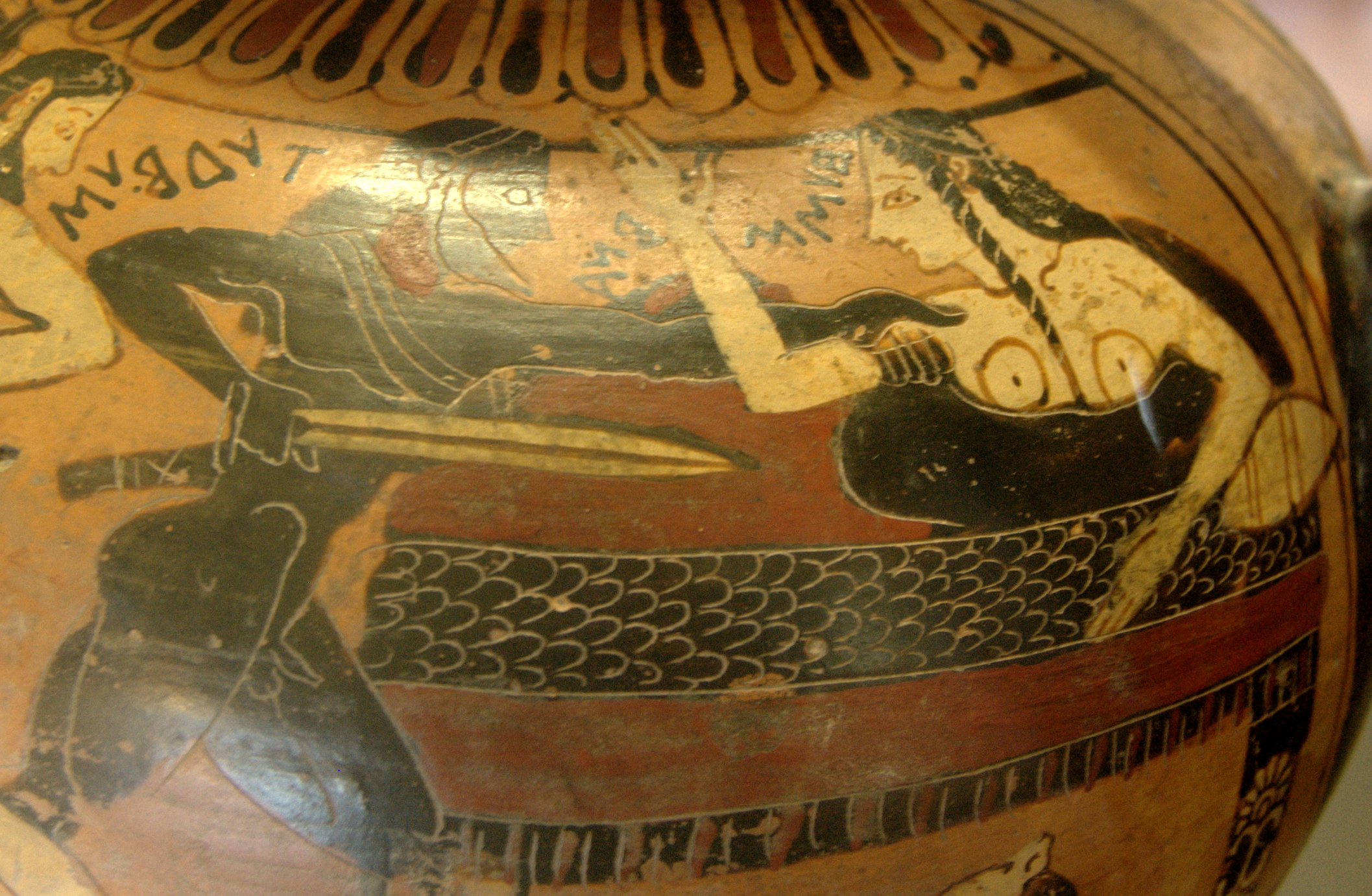
Corinthian vase depicting Mimnermus's original account of Ismene's death. Tydeus is depicted in black (usual for a male), Ismene and her fleeing lover Theoclymenus are white (usual for females and appropriate for an adulterous male on the run).

Elegy has been described as "a variation upon the heroic hexameter, in the direction of lyric poetry," and, in Mimnermus, this takes the form of a variation on Homer, as appears for example in Fragment 1, quoted below, about which one modern scholar had this to say"

Mimnermus' dependence on Homer is striking: it is amusing to see him express such un-Homeric thoughts as those of fr.1 in language which is almost entirely Homer's. Homer's vocabulary, line-endings, formulas, similes, all reappear, but from this material Mimnermus creates quite a distinctive poetry of easy grace and pleasing rhythm.

— David A. Campbell

Fragment 1

τίς δὲ βίος, τί δὲ τερπνὸν ἄτερ χρυσῆς Ἀφροδίτης;

τεθναίην, ὅτε μοι μηκέτι ταῦτα μέλοι,

κρυπταδίη φιλότης καὶ μείλιχα δῶρα καὶ εὐνή·

οἷ’ ἥβης ἄνθεα γίγνεται ἁρπαλέα

ἀνδράσιν ἠδὲ γυναιξίν· ἐπεὶ δ’ ὀδυνηρὸν ἐπέλθῃ

γῆρας, ὅ τ’ αἰσχρὸν ὁμῶς καὶ κακὸν ἄνδρα τιθεῖ,

αἰεί μιν φρένας ἀμφὶ κακαὶ τείρουσι μέριμναι,

οὐδ’ αὐγὰς προσορῶν τέρπεται ἠελίου,

ἀλλ’ ἐχθρὸς μὲν παισίν, ἀτίμαστος δὲ γυναιξίν·

οὕτως ἀργαλέον γῆρας ἔθηκε θεός.

Typically, the elegiac couplet enabled a poet to develop his ideas in brief, striking phrases, often made more memorable by internal rhyme in the shorter, pentameter line. Mimnermus employs the internal rhyme in the pentameter lines 2 (μοι... μέλοι) and 4 (ἄνθεα...ἁρπαλέα). Here is the same poem paraphrased in English to imitate the rhythms of an elegy, with half-rhymes employed in the same lines 2 (far...for) and 4 (youth...bloom):

What is life, what is sweet, if it is missing golden Aphrodite?

Death would be better by far than to live with no time for

Amorous assignations and the gift of tenderness and bedrooms,

All of those things that give youth all of its covetted bloom,

Both for men and for women. But when there arrives the vexatiousness

Of old age, even good looks alter to unsightliness

And the heart wears away under the endlessness of its anxieties:

There is no joy anymore then in the light of the sun;

In children there is found hate and in women there is found no respect.

So difficult has old age been made for us all by God!

Commenting on the poem, Maurice Bowra observed that "...after the challenging, flaunting opening we are led through a swift account of youth, and then as we approach the horrors of old age, the verse becomes slower, the sentences shorter, the stops more emphatic, until the poet closes with a short, damning line of summary."

Of all the other early elegists, only Archilochus might be compared with Mimnermus for effective use of language, both being lifelong poets of outstanding skill.

=== Comments by other poets ===
==== Solon ====
Addressing Mimnermus and criticizing him for his stated wish to die at sixty years of age, as quoted above in Life and work, the Athenian sage said:

ἀλλ᾽ εἴ μοι κἂν νῦν ἔτι πείσεαι, ἔξελε τοῦτον:—
μηδὲ μέγαιρ᾽ ὅτι σεῦ λῷον ἐπεφρασάμην:—
καὶ μεταποίησον, Λιγυαιστάδη, ὧδε δ᾽ ἄειδε:
ὀγδωκονταέτη μοῖρα κίχοι θανάτου.

Translation:

But if even now you will listen to me, remove this (i.e. Mimnermus's objectionable verse)—
and do not be offended because my thoughts are better than yours—
and changing it, Ligyaistades, sing as follows:
May my fated death come at eighty.

==== Hermesianax ====
And Mimnermus who, after much suffering, discovered the sweet sound and breath given off by the soft pentameter, was on fire for Nanno...

==== Callimachus ====
Defining the kind of poetry he liked and believed best suited to his own, much later times, the Alexandrian scholar-poet commended Mimnermus thus [brackets indicate gaps in the text]:

Of the two [types of poetry] it was his slender [verses?], not the big lady, that revealed Mimnermus' sweetness.

==== Propertius ====
plus in amore valet Mimnermi versus Homero:
carmina mansuetus lenia quaerit Amor.

Translation:

In love the verses of Mimnermus prevail over those of Homer.
Gentle love calls for soft songs.

==== Horace ====
si, Mimnermus uti censet, sine amore iocisque
nil est iucundum, vivas in amore iocisque.

Translation:

If, as Mimnermus believes, without love and jests
There is no joy, may you live amid love and jests.

== Editions and translations ==
- Kanellakis, Dimitrios, ed. (2023). Mimnermus: Elegies (with an Introduction, Translation and Commentary). Liverpool University Press. ISBN 978-1-83764-274-8.
- Miller, Andrew M. (1996). Greek Lyric: An Anthology in Translation. Hackett Pub. Company. ISBN 978-0-87220-291-7.
- Gerber, Douglas E. (1999). Greek Elegiac Poetry: From the Seventh to the Fifth Centuries B.C. Harvard University Press. ISBN 978-0-674-99582-6.
- Several fragments translated by Steve Hays
- Translation of Fragment 2 into Elegiac couplets
