= Augeas (poet) =

Ancient Greek playwright

Augeas or Augias (Ancient Greek: Αὐγέας or Ancient Greek: Αὐγίας) was an Athenian poet of the middle comedy who lived around the 4th or 5th century BCE. We know of him only from a single mention in the 10th century Byzantine encyclopedia known as the Suda, which describes the following plays of his: Agroikos (Ἄγροικος), Dis (Δίς), Kateroumenous (Κατηρούμενος), and Porphyra (Πορφύρα).

He appears likewise to have written epic poems, and to have borrowed from Antimachus of Teos.
