= Dionysius the Phasilite =

Ancient Greek grammarian

Dionysius the Phaselite (Ancient Greek: Διονύσιος ο Φασηλίτης) was an ancient Greek grammarian. He flourished in the Hellenistic period, around the 1st century BC.

He was particularly involved in the criticism of ancient poetry. His works are considered to be "On Poets" and "On the Poetry of Antimachus" as well as an excerpt from a commentary on Bacchylides.

In his time, special importance was given to the characterization of various poems. A significant problem had arisen then regarding the classification of poems into dithyrambs and paeans. Among those that sparked particular interest was the poem Cassandra by Bacchylides, for which Dionysius agreed with Aristarchus that it was a dithyramb, while he disagreed with Callimachus who had characterized it as a paean.

== Bibliography ==
- "Νεώτερον Εγκυκλοπαιδικόν Λεξικόν Ηλίου / Neoteron Encyclopedic Lexicon of Helios" vol. 6, p. 90 (8th ed.)
- "Εγκυκλοπαίδεια Πάπυρος Λαρούς Μπριτάννικα / Encyclopedia Papyrus Larousse Britannica" vol. 21, p. 136 (15th ed.)
