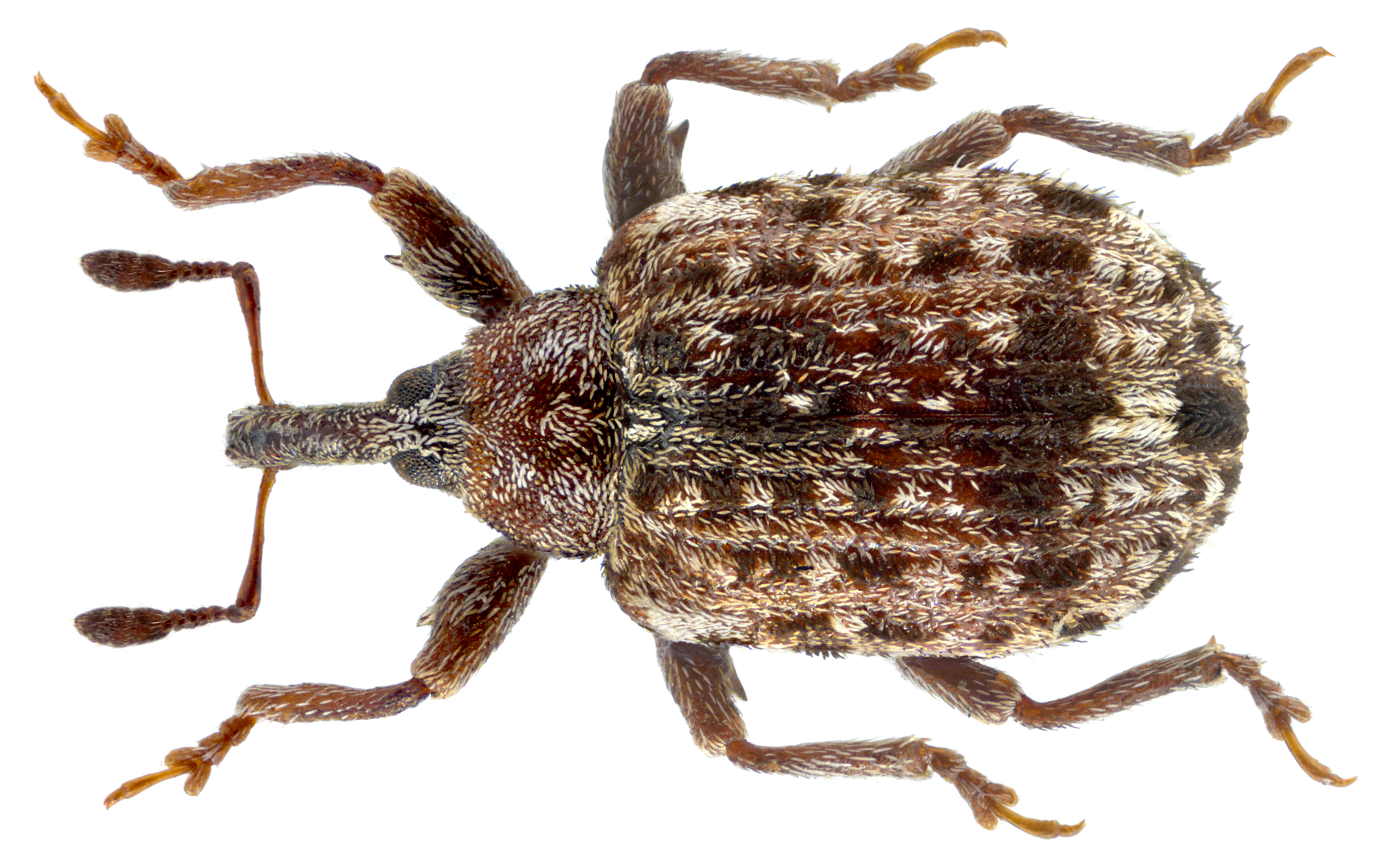
- Cleopus pulchellus 2,9 mm (2,8-3,0 mm)

Scientific classification
- Kingdom: Animalia
- Phylum: Arthropoda
- Class: Insecta
- Order: Coleoptera
- Suborder: Polyphaga
- Infraorder: Cucujiformia
- Family: Curculionidae
- Genus: Cleopus
- Species: C. pulchellus

Binomial name
- Cleopus pulchellus (Herbst, 1795)

= Cleopus pulchellus =

Species of beetle

Cleopus pulchellus is a species of weevil native to Europe.
