= Antimachus of Heliopolis =

Ancient Greek poet

Antimachus of Heliopolis (Ancient Greek: Ἀντίμαχος ὁ Ἡλιοπολίτης) in Egypt was a poet of ancient Greece who was mentioned in the Suda as having written a poem called Cosmopoia (Κοσμοποιΐα), that is, on the creation of the universe, consisting of 3780 hexameter verses. Aside from one quotation, the poem is lost.

The Byzantine poet John Tzetzes quotes three lines from Antimachus, but whether they belong to Antimachus of Heliopolis, or to either of the two other poets of the same name (see Antimachus (disambiguation)), cannot be ascertained.
