= Chytrium =

Ancient town of Ionia

Coordinates: 38°20′16″N 26°44′31″E

Chytrium or Chytrion (Χυτριόν), or Chytrum or Chytron (Χυτρόν), also known as Chytum or Chyton (Χυτόν) was a town of ancient Ionia. Strabo claims that it was here that the city of Clazomenae was initially founded.

Its site is located southwest of Urla, İzmir Province, Turkey.
