= Cleopus elegans =

Scientific classification
- Kingdom: Animalia
- Phylum: Arthropoda
- Class: Insecta
- Order: Coleoptera
- Suborder: Polyphaga
- Infraorder: Cucujiformia
- Family: Curculionidae
- Genus: Cleopus
- Species: C. elegans

Binomial name
- Cleopus elegans Costa, 1834

Species of beetle

Cleopus elegans is a species of true weevils in the subfamily Curculioninae. It was first described in Volla, Italy.
