= Colophon (city) =

Ancient former city in Ionia (in modern Lydia, Turkey)

- Κολοφών (in Ancient Greek)
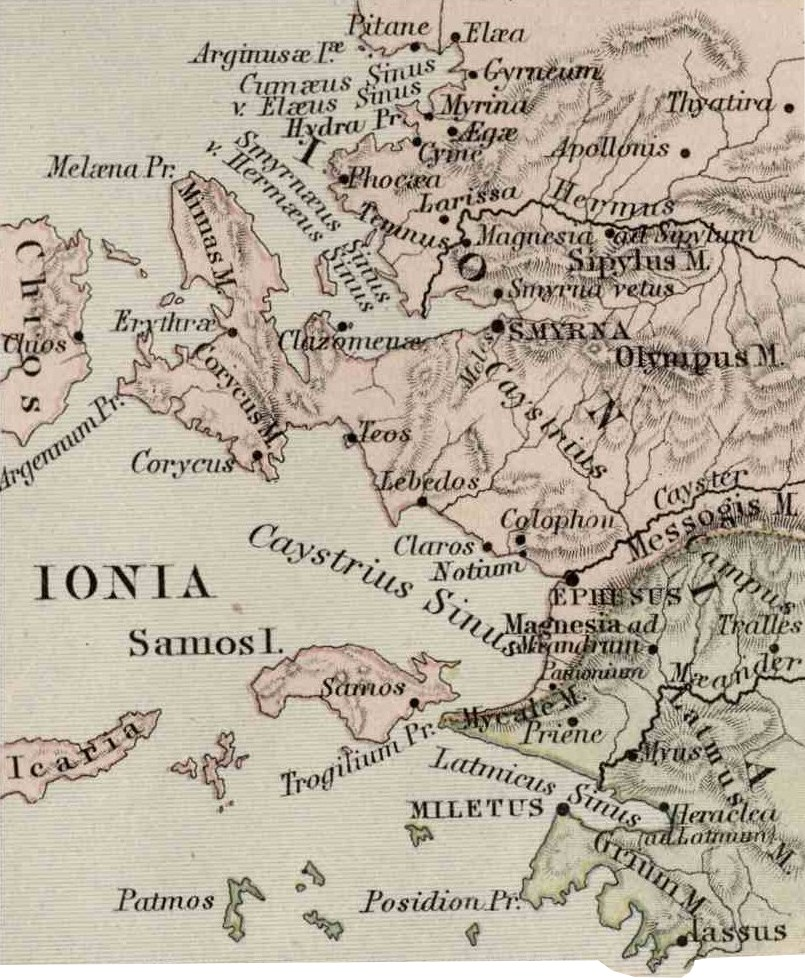
- Colophon is just right of center

- Location within Turkey
- 38°06′32″N 27°08′30″E
- Type: Settlement
- Cultures: Greek, Roman
- Associated with: Xenophanes, Antimachus, Mimnermus, Hermesianax
- Location: Değirmendere, İzmir Province, Turkey
- Region: Ionia

Colophon (/ˈkɒləˌfɒn, -fən/; Ancient Greek: Κολοφών, romanized: Kolophṓn) was an ancient city in Ionia. Founded around the end of the 2nd millennium BC, it was likely one of the oldest of the twelve cities of the Ionian League. It was located between Lebedos (120 stadia to the west) and Ephesus (70 stadia to its south). Its ruins are south of the town Değirmendere in the Menderes district of İzmir Province, Turkey.

The city's name comes from the word κολοφών, "summit", (which is also the origin of the bibliographic term "colophon", in the metaphorical sense of a 'crowning touch',) as it was sited along a ridgeline. The term colophony for rosin comes from the term colophonia resina (Ancient Greek: Κολοφωνία ῥητίνη Kolophōnia rhētinē), resin from the pine trees of Colophon, which was highly valued for increasing friction of the bow hairs of stringed musical instruments.

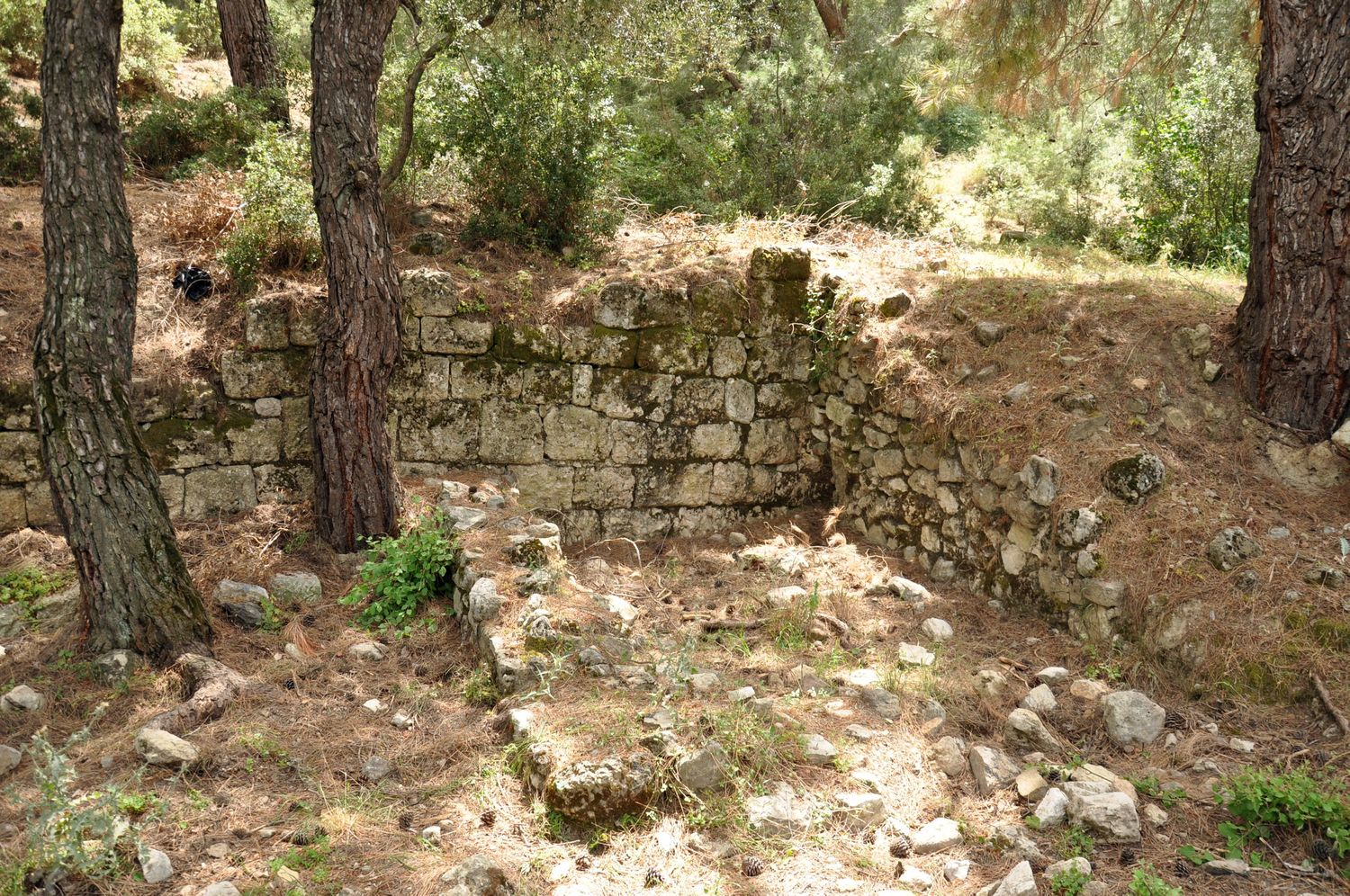
Ruins of Colophon

== History ==
=== Iron Age ===
According to Apollodorus and Proclus, the mythical seer Calchas died at Colophon after the end of the Trojan War. Strabo names Clarus as the place of his death, which would later be a cult center in the territory of Colophon. An oracle had it that he would die when he would meet a better seer than himself. As Calchas and the other heroes on their way home from Troy came upon the seer Mopsus in Colophon, the two competed in their mantic qualities. Calchas couldn't equal Mopsus' skills as a seer, being a son of Apollo and Manto, so he died.

In Greek antiquity Damasichthon and Promethus, two sons of Codrus, King of Athens, established a colony there. (Promethus later killed Damasichthon; he then escaped to Naxos, and died there, but his corpse was brought back to Colophon by Damasichthon's sons, and subsequently lay near Colophon). It was the birthplace of the philosopher Xenophanes and the poets Antimachus and Mimnermus.

Colophon was the strongest of the Ionian cities and renowned both for its cavalry and for the inhabitants' luxurious lifestyle, until Gyges of Lydia conquered it in the 7th century BC. Colophon then went into decline and was eclipsed by neighbouring Ephesus and by the rising naval power of Ionia, Miletus.

=== Classical Age ===
After the death of Alexander the Great, Perdiccas expelled the Athenian settlers on Samos to Colophon, including the family of Epicurus, who joined them there after completing his military service.

In the 3rd century BC, it was destroyed by Lysimachus—a Macedonian officer, one of the successors (Diadochi) of Alexander the Great, later a king (306 BC) in Thrace and Asia Minor, during the same era when he nearly destroyed (and did depopulate by forced expulsion) the neighboring Ionian League city of Lebedos.

Notium served as the port, and in the neighbourhood was the village of Clarus, with its famous temple and oracle of Apollo Clarius, where Calchas vied with Mopsus in divinatory science.

In Roman times, after Lysimachus' conquest, Colophon failed to recover (unlike Lebedos) and lost its importance; actually, the name was transferred to the site of the port village of Notium, and the latter name disappeared between the Peloponnesian War and the time of Cicero (late 5th century BC to 1st century BC).

Additionally, the city, as a major location on the Ionic mainland, was cited as a possible home or birthplace for Homer. In his True History, Lucian lists it as a possible birthplace along with the island of Khios and the city of Smyrna, though Lucian's Homer claims to be from Babylon.

== Bishopric ==
While tradition gave as the first bishops of the bishopric of Colophon Sosthenes (Acts 18:17 and 1 Corinthians 1:1) and Tychicus (Titus 3:12), the only ones historically documented are Eulalius or Euthalius, who was at the First Council of Ephesus in 431, and Alexander who was represented at the Council of Chalcedon in 451, without attending it personally.

Colophon continued to be listed in Notitiae Episcopatuum as late as the 12th or 13th century, as a suffragan of Ephesus, capital of the Roman province of Asia.

No longer a residential bishopric, Colophon is today listed by the Catholic Church as a titular see.

== Notable people ==
- Antimachus, an Ancient Greek poet and grammarian
- Apelles, an Ancient Greek painter
- Hermesianax (poet), an Ancient Greek elegiac poet of the Hellenistic period
- Hermesianax, an Ancient Greek wrestler, son of Agoneus (Ancient Greek: Ἀγονέος), who won at boys' wrestling in the Ancient Olympic Games and the commonwealth of Colophon erected a statue dedicated to him. In later year, his grandson (son of his daughter), Icasius (Ancient Greek: Εἰκάσιος), was also victor at wrestling in the games.
- Mimnermus, an Ancient Greek elegiac poet
- Xenophanes, an Ancient Greek Pre-Socratic philosopher, theologian, poet, and social and religious critic

== Sources ==
- Works by Lucian of Samosata at Project Gutenberg
- Loeb Classical Library, vol. 3/8 of Lucian's works, with facing Greek text
- Works of Lucian of Samostata at sacred-texts.com
- Herodotus Project: Colophon
- 'The Rise of the Greeks' - Michael Grant (Guild Publishing) 1987 - pages 159, 345.
