= Nausiphanes =

Ancient Greek philosopher

Nausiphanes (Greek: Ναυσιφάνης; lived c. 325 BC) was an ancient Greek atomist philosopher from Teos.

Nausiphanes reportedly had a large number of pupils, and was particularly famous as a rhetorician. He argued that the study of natural philosophy (physics) was the best foundation for studying rhetoric or politics, which is attacked in a surviving work of Philodemus, On Rhetoric. Furthermore, Nausiphanes was an adherent of Democritus's sceptical side and deemed human judgment as being no more than a realignment of atoms in the mind. Nausiphanes substituted the term akataplêxia (“undauntability”) for Democritus’ athambiê, “fearlessness,” as crucial for eudaimonia. Diogenes Laërtius recounts that Epicurus was at one time one of his students, but was unsatisfied with him, and apparently abused him in his writings. Epicurus may also have derived his Canon from the Tripod of Nausiphanes. Only the following summary of the Tripod by Philodemus survives:

1. The man of science has the capacity for rhetoric, even if he does not practise it.
2. The wise man will pursue rhetoric, because honour depends on winning a reputation for cleverness in politics, rather than on the over-lauded virtues. The wise man is he who can persuade his hearers; this power belongs to the man of science, its source being his knowledge of the facts, so that he could pass on his own convictions not only to his pupils but to any race of people. Having a knowledge of the facts, he is able to lead his audience where he wishes, because he can tell them what is to their advantage, which is what they wish to hear. The scientist has command of the best diction also: not that created by vain imagination and usage, but that based on the nature of things. He also has command of logic, without which knowledge is impossible, and is best qualified in that art indispensable to a statesman in a democracy or monarchy or any other constitution, of calculation of the future from the known facts. The man who employs continuous discourse will be best able to employ the dialectic method and vice versa, because both depend on an accurate judgement of how to lead pupils from the known to the unknown; that is, they depend upon a knowledge of the 'right time' and 'right measure' in speaking.
3. Nausiphanes gave 'immovability' as the goal of life, this being the name he gave to Democritus’ 'imperturbability'.
4. Of those things which appear to exist, nothing exists more than it does not exist.
