= Scythinus of Teos =

Ancient Greek iambic poet

Scythinus of Teos (Ancient Greek: Σκυθίνος; fl. 5th or 4th century BCE) was an iambic poet from Teos who turned the work of the philosopher Heraclitus into verse. A considerable fragment, apparently from this work, is preserved by Stobaeus. Two of his epigrams are also preserved in the Greek Anthology.

Plutarch also quotes from him twice some verses respecting the lyre, and Athenaeus quotes from him once. Scythinus is also mentioned by Stephanus of Byzantium.
