= Teos =

Ancient Greek maritime city of Ionia

- Τέως (Ancient Greek)
- Teo
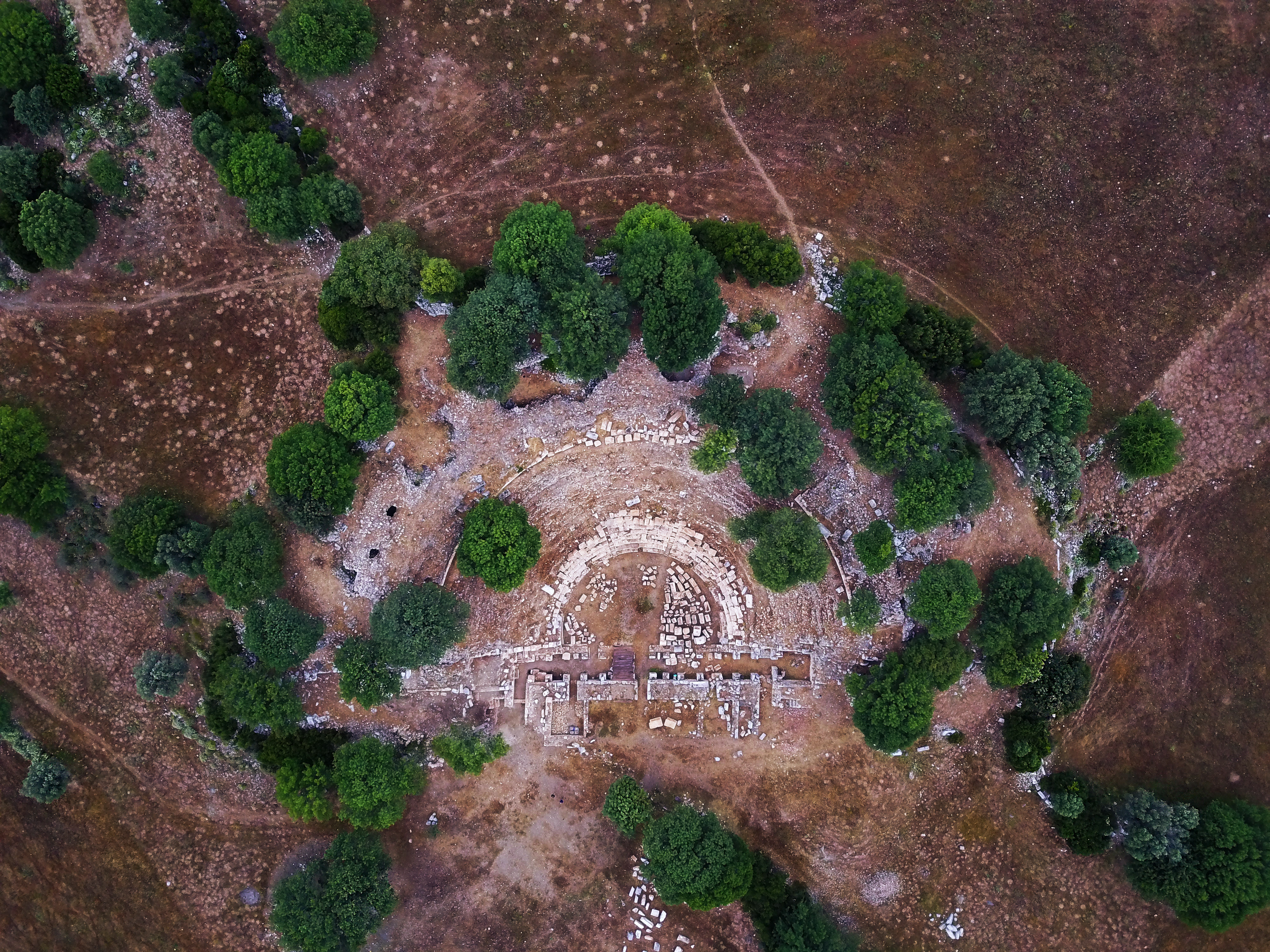
- Ruins of the theatre in Teos

- Location within Turkey
- 38°10′38″N 26°47′06″E
- Type: Settlement
- Periods: Archaic Greek to Roman Imperial
- Cultures: Greek, Roman
- Associated with: Andron, Anacreon, Antimachus, Apellicon, Hecataeus of Abdera, Nausiphanes, Protagoras, Scythinus
- Location: Sığacık, İzmir Province, Turkey
- Region: Ionia

Site notes
- Condition: Ruined

Teos (Ancient Greek: Τέως) or Teo was an ancient Greek city on the coast of Ionia, on a peninsula between Chytrium and Myonnesus. It was founded by Minyans from Orchomenus, Ionians and Boeotians, but the date of its foundation is unknown. Teos was one of the twelve cities which formed the Ionian League. The city was situated on a low hilly isthmus. Its ruins are located to the south of the modern town of Sığacık in the Seferihisar district of İzmir Province, Turkey.

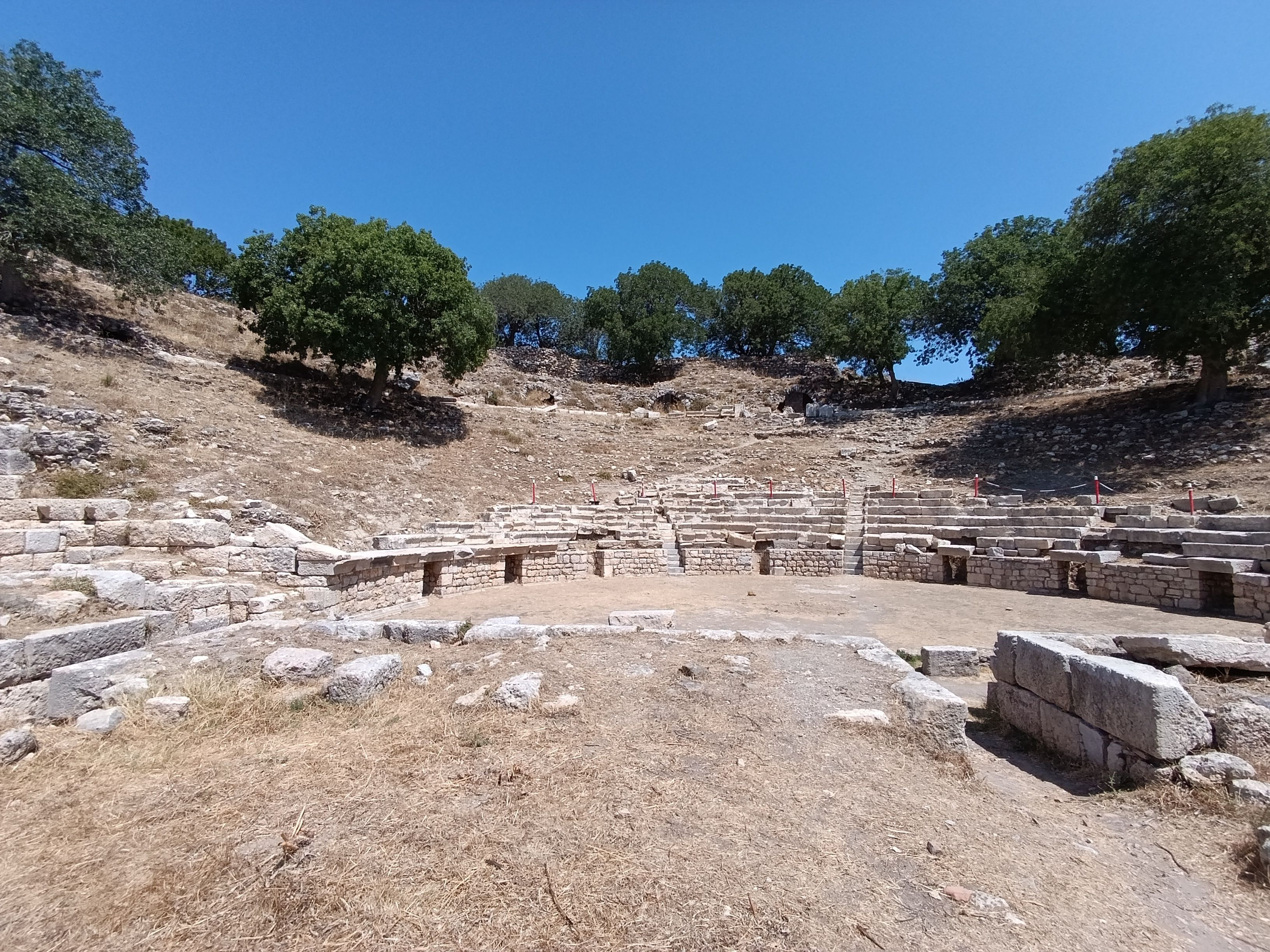
Theatre in Teos ancient city

== History ==
=== Iron Age ===
Pausanias writes that the city was founded by Minyans from Orchomenus under the leadership of Athamas, a descendant of Athamas the son of Aeolus. Later on they were joined by Ionians and more colonists from Athens and Boeotia. Because it was founded by Athamas, Anacreon also called it Athamantis (Ἀθαμαντίς).

It was a member of the Lydian group of the Ionian League, one of the four groups defined by Herodotus, based on the particular dialects of the cities. Vitruvius notes Hermogenes of Priene as the architect of the monopteral temple of Dionysus at Teos.

=== Classical Age ===
==== Persian period ====
Teos was a flourishing seaport with two fine harbours until Cyrus the Great invaded Lydia and Ionia (c. 546 BC). The Teans found it prudent to retire overseas, to the newly founded colonies of Abdera in Thrace and Phanagoria on the Asian side of the Cimmerian Bosporus. The port was revived by Antigonus Cyclops.

A shipwreck near Tektaş, a small rock outcrop near Teos harbour, dates from the Classical period (around the 6th to the 4th centuries BC) and implies trading connections by sea with the eastern Aegean Islands.

==== Roman period ====
During the times of the Roman emperors, the town was noted for its wine, a theatre and Temple of Dionysus. These are positioned near the acropolis, which is situated on a low hill and had fortifications by the 6th century.

== The site today ==
The modern village of Sığacık is situated close to the ruins of Teos. The interior of what was previously the city has now been intensively farmed, which makes it difficult to excavate the site. Through ploughing, pottery has been brought to the surface of the earth, which has been collected through archaeological survey.

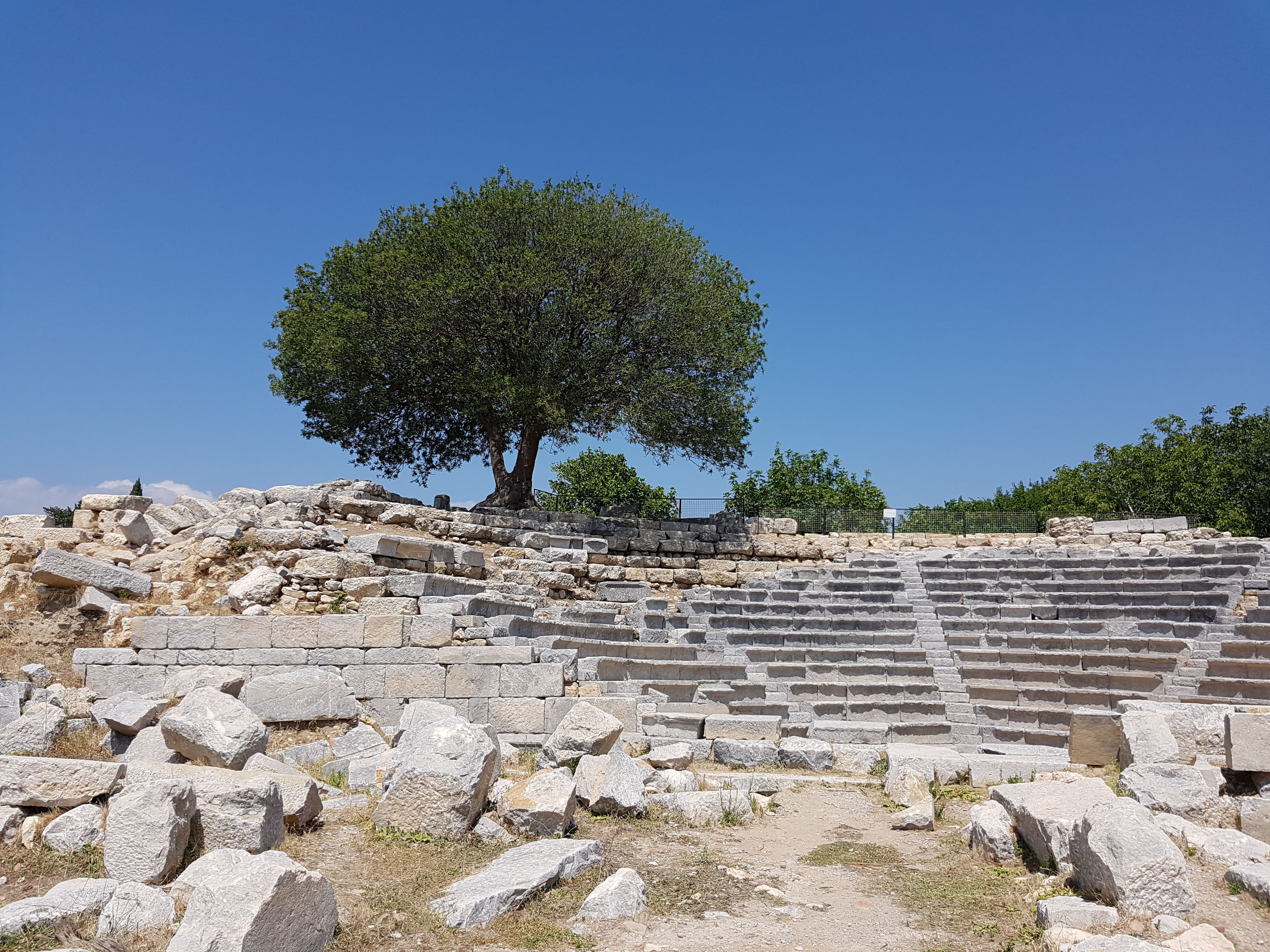
The bouleuterion in Teos ancient city

An interesting rental agreement chiseled into stone was uncovered in 2016 in the ruins of Teos.

== Notable people ==
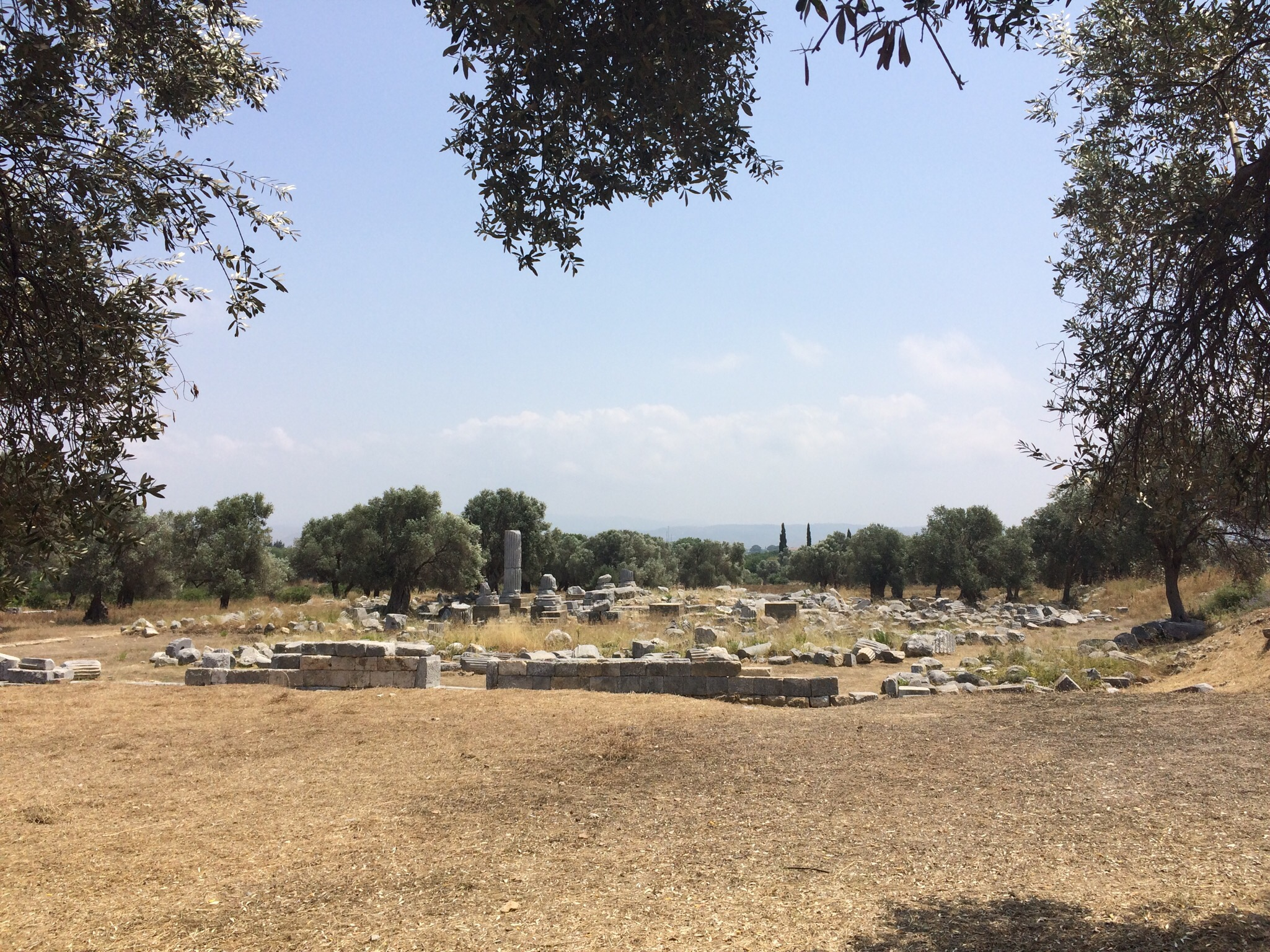
Ruins at Teos

- Anacreon the poet,
- Hecateus the historian
- Protagoras the sophist
- Scythinus the poet
- Andron the geographer
- Antimachus the epic poet
- Apellicon, the preserver of the works of Aristotle
- Epicurus reportedly grew up in Teos and studied there under Nausiphanes, a disciple of Democritus.

== See also ==
- List of ancient Greek cities
