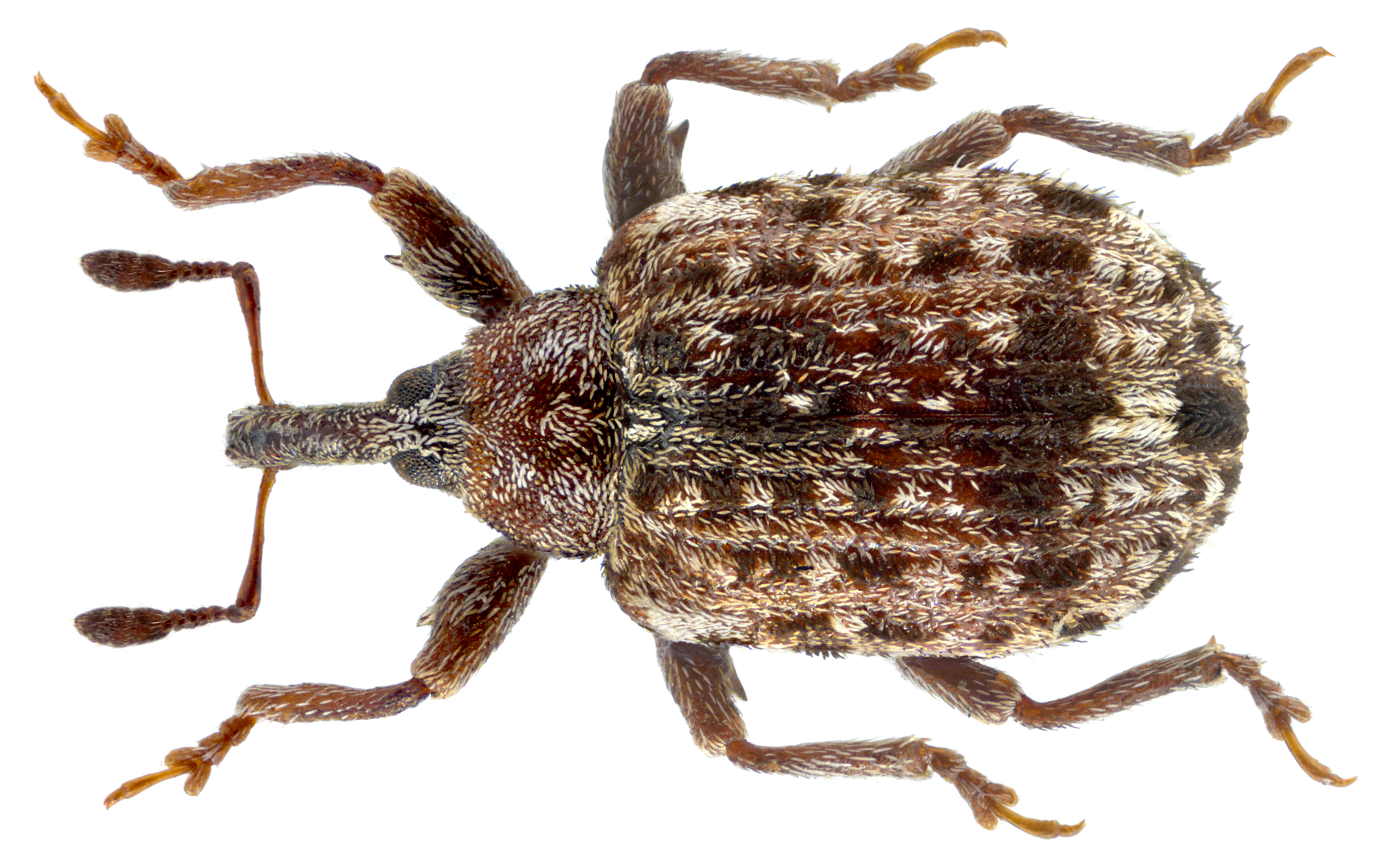
- Cleopus pulchellus

Scientific classification
- Kingdom: Animalia
- Phylum: Arthropoda
- Class: Insecta
- Order: Coleoptera
- Suborder: Polyphaga
- Infraorder: Cucujiformia
- Family: Curculionidae
- Subfamily: Curculioninae
- Tribe: Cionini
- Genus: Cleopus; Dejean, 1821

Species
- Several, including: Cleopus elegans; Cleopus japonicus; Cleopus pulchellus

Synonyms
- Calydonus (Dejean, 1821); Platylaemus (Weise, 1883); Platysma (Dejean, 1821); Timagora (Dejean, 1821)

= Cleopus =

Genus of beetles

Cleopus is a genus of true weevils in the subfamily Curculioninae.
