= Hermesianax (poet) =

Ancient Greek poet

Hermesianax of Colophon (Greek: Ἑρμησιάναξ; gen.: Ἑρμησιάνακτος) was an Ancient Greek elegiac poet of the Hellenistic period, said to be a pupil of Philitas of Cos; the dates of his life and work are all but lost, but Philitas is supposed to have been born c. 340 BC.

His chief work was a poem in three books, dedicated to his mistress Leontion. Of this poem a fragment of about one hundred lines has been preserved by Athenaeus. Plaintive in tone, it enumerates instances, mythological and semi-historical, of the irresistible power of love. Hermesianax, whose style is characterized by alternate force and tenderness, was exceedingly popular in his own times, and was highly esteemed even in the Augustan period.

Many separate editions have been published of the fragment, the text of which is in a very unsatisfactory condition: by FW Schneidewin (1838), J Bailey (1839, with notes, glossary, and Latin and English versions), and others; R Schulze's Quaestiones Hermesianacteae (1858) contains an account of the life and writings of the poet and a section on the identity of Leontion.

== Representation in art ==
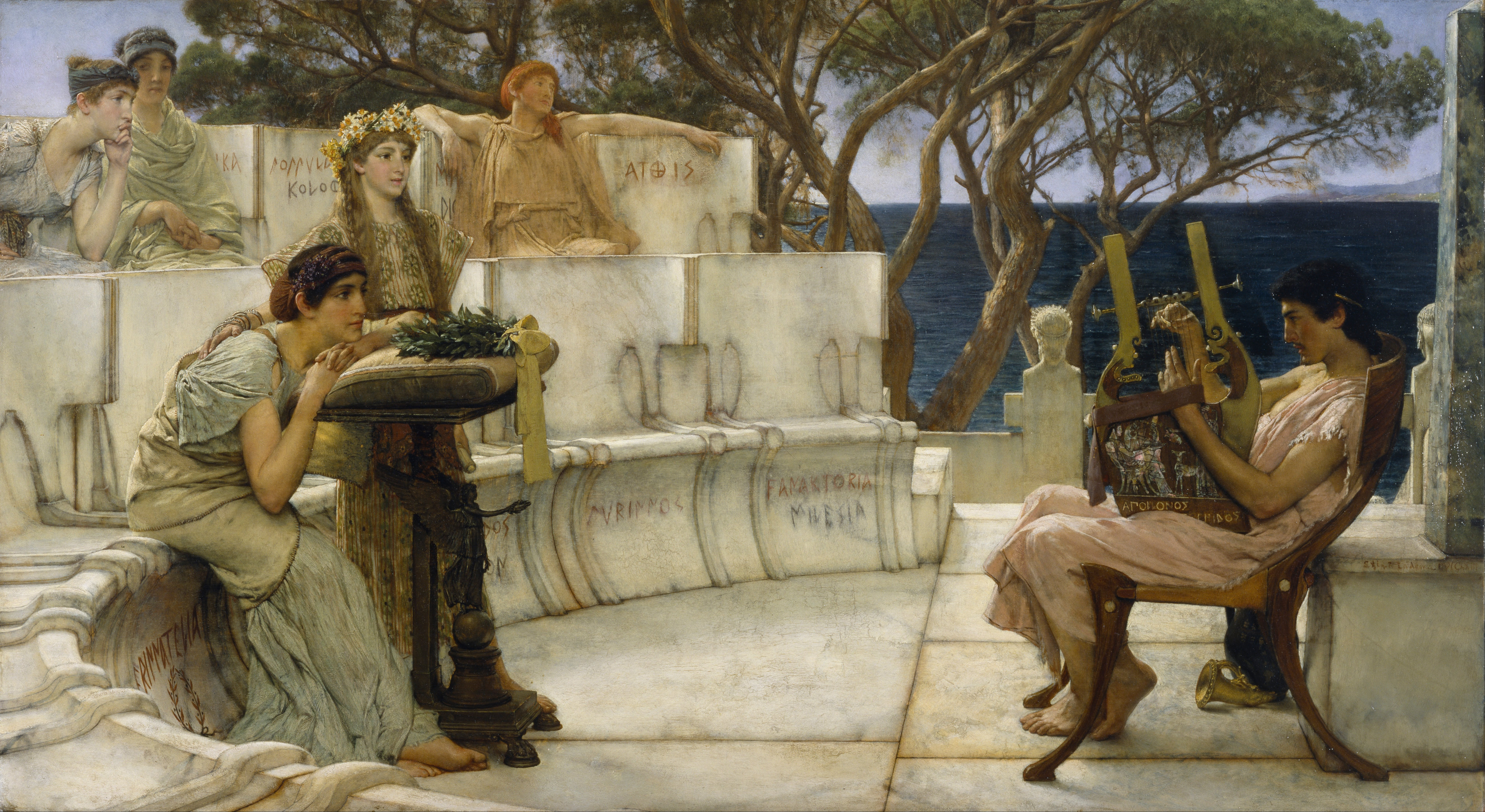
Sappho and Alcaeus, 1881. Representation of "Banquet of the Learned," book 2, line 598. The Walters Art Museum.
