= Thebaid (Greek poem) =

Ancient Greek epic poem of uncertain authorship

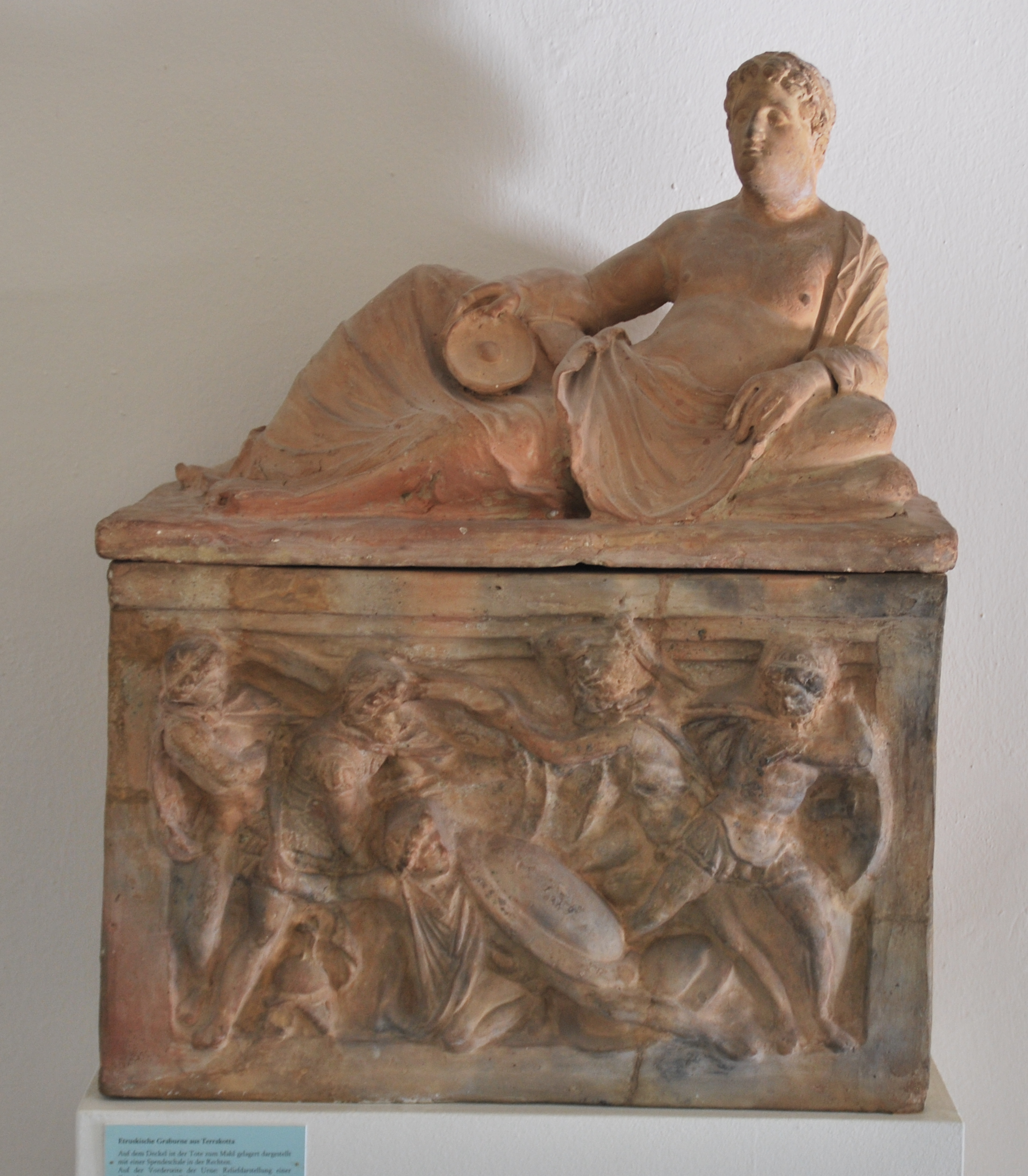
Thebaid (Greek poem)

The Thebaid or Thebais (Ancient Greek: Θηβαΐς, Thēbais), also called the Cyclic Thebaid, is an Ancient Greek epic poem of uncertain authorship (see Cyclic poets) sometimes attributed by early writers to Homer, for example, by the poet Callinus and the historian Herodotus. It told the story of the war between the brothers Eteocles and Polynices, and was regarded as forming part of a Theban Cycle. Only fragments of the text survive.

== See also ==
- Thebaid (Statius)

== Select editions and translations ==
=== Critical editions ===
- Kinkel, G. (1877), Epicorum Graecorum fragmenta, vol. 1, Leipzig.
- Allen, T.W. (1912), Homeri opera. Tomus V: Hymni, Cyclus, Fragmenta, Margites, Batrachomyomachia, Vitae, Oxford, ISBN 0-19-814534-9.
- Bernabé, A. (1988), Poetae epici Graecae, vol. pars i, Leipzig, ISBN 978-3-598-71706-2.
- Davies, M. (1988), Epicorum Graecorum fragmenta, Göttingen, ISBN 978-3-525-25747-0.

=== Translations ===
- Evelyn-White, H.G. (1936), Hesiod, the Homeric Hymns, and Homerica, Loeb Classical Library (3rd rev. ed.), Cambridge, Massachusetts, ISBN 978-0-674-99063-0. (The link is to the 1st edition of 1914.) English translation with facing Greek text; now obsolete except for its translations of the ancient quotations.
- West, M.L. (2003), Greek Epic Fragments, Loeb Classical Library, Cambridge, Massachusetts, ISBN 978-0-674-99605-2. Greek text with facing English translation

== Bibliography ==
- Davies, M. (1989), Greek Epic Cycle, London, ISBN 978-1853990397.
