= Antimachus (sculptor) =

Ancient Greek sculptor

Antimachus (Ancient Greek: Ἀντίμαχος) was a sculptor of ancient Greece celebrated for his statues of women.
