= Callinus =

Ancient Greek poet

Callinus (Ancient Greek: Καλλῖνος, Kallinos; fl. mid-7th c. BC) was an ancient Greek elegiac poet who lived in the city of Ephesus in Asia Minor in the mid-7th century BC. His poetry is representative of the genre of martial exhortation elegy in which Tyrtaeus also specialized and which both Archilochus and Mimnermus appear to have composed. Along with these poets, all his near contemporaries, Callinus was considered the inventor of the elegiac couplet by some ancient critics.

He resided in Ephesus in Asia Minor. He is supposed to have flourished between the invasion of Asia Minor by the Cimmerians and their expulsion by Alyattes (630–560 BC). During his lifetime his own countrymen were also engaged in a life-and-death struggle with the Magnesians. These two events give the key to his poetry, in which he endeavours to rouse the indolent Ionians to a sense of patriotism.

Only a few fragments of the Callinus' poetry have survived. One of the longest fragments, consisting of 21 lines of verse, is a patriotic exhortation to his fellow Ephesians urging them to fight the invading Cimmerians, who were menacing the Greek colonies in Asia Minor:

It is honorable and splendid for a man to fight
for his country and children and wedded wife
against enemies, but death will come whenever
the Moirai so spin.

τιμῆέν τε γάρ ἐστι καὶ ἀγλαὸν ἀνδρὶ μάχεσθαι
γῆς πέρι καὶ παίδων κουριδίης τ' ἀλόχου
δυσμενέσιν· θάνατος δὲ τότ' ἔσσεται, ὁππότε κεν δὴ
Μοῖραι ἐπικλώσωσ᾽.

Works of martial elegy such as this often allude to the language and the thematic content of Homer's Iliad. It is likely that Callinus performed his poetry at symposia.

== Select bibliography ==
- Barron, J.P.; Easterling, P.E.; Knox, B.M.W. (1985), "Elegy and Iambus", in P.E. Easterling; B.M.W. Knox (eds.), The Cambridge History of Classical Literature: Greek Literature, Cambridge, pp. 117–64, ISBN 978-0-521-21042-3.
- Bergk, T. (1882), Poetae lyrici Graeci, Leipzig.
- Bowie, E.L. (1986), "Early Greek Elegy, Symposium and Public Festival", The Journal of Hellenic Studies, 106: 13–35, doi:10.2307/629640, JSTOR 629640, S2CID 162738189.
- Campbell, D.A. (1982), Greek Lyric Poetry (2nd ed.), London, ISBN 0-86292-008-6. — Text and commentary on select fragments.
- Diehl, E. (1949–52), Anthologia lyrica Graeca (3rd ed.), Leipzig. — Critical edition of the Greek.
- Gerber, D.E. (1999), Greek Iambic Poetry, Loeb Classical Library (2nd ed.), Cambridge, MA, ISBN 978-0674995819. — Translation with facing Greek text.
- Irwin, E. (2005), Solon & Early Greek Poetry: The Politics of Exhortation, Cambridge, ISBN 978-0521851787.
- West, M.L. (1974), Studies in Greek Elegy and Iambus, Berlin, ISBN 978-3110045857.
- West, M.L. (1992), Iambi et Elegi Graeci ante Alexandrum cantati, vol. ii (2nd ed.), Oxford, ISBN 0-19-814096-7. — Critical edition of the Greek.
- West, M.L. (2003), Greek Epic Fragments, Loeb Classical Library, Cambridge, MA, ISBN 978-0-674-99605-2.
