= Ionia =

Region in Turkey

Coordinates: 38.2°N 27.5°E

- Ancient region of Anatolia
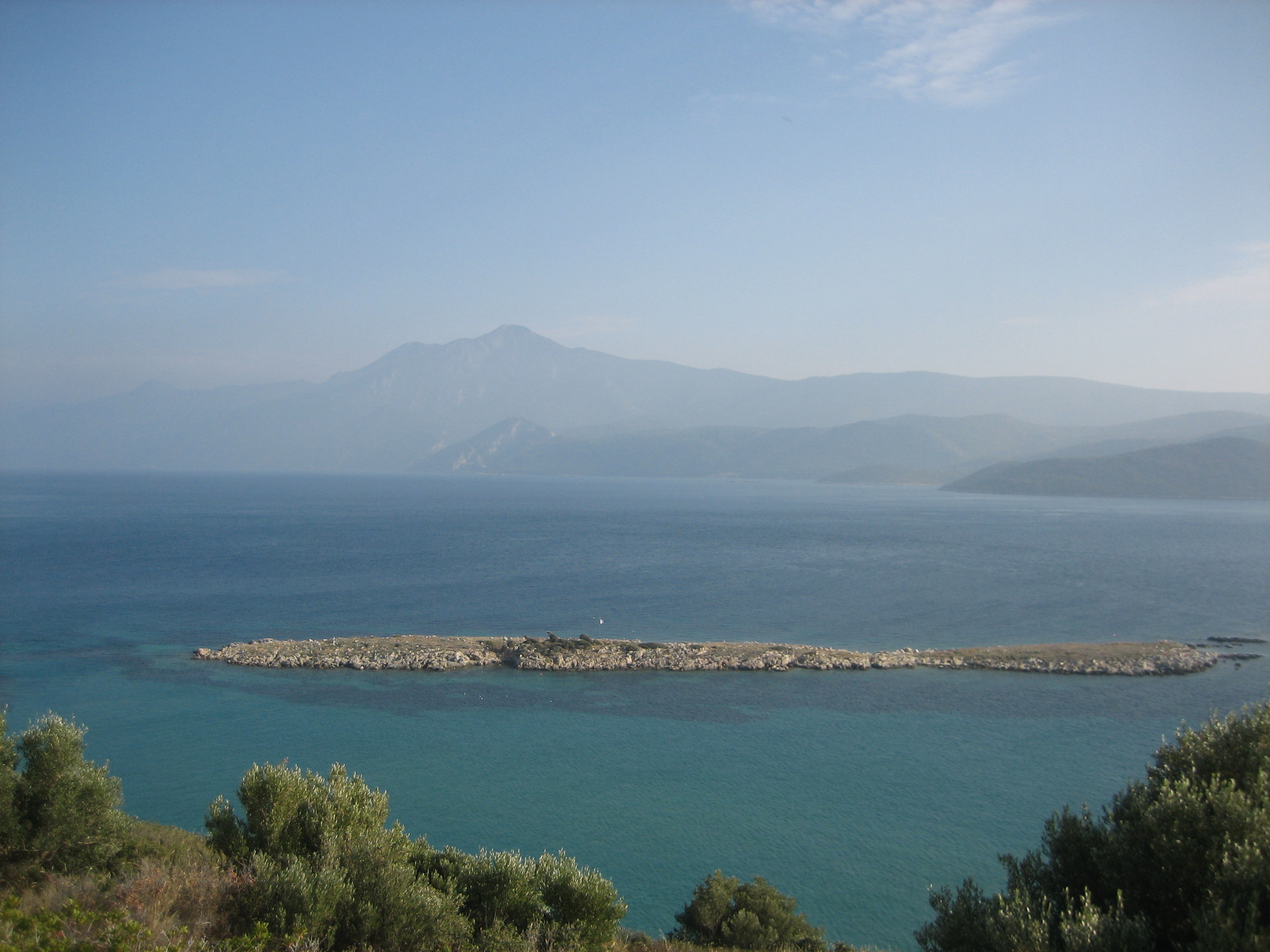
- Mount Mycale, site of the Panionium

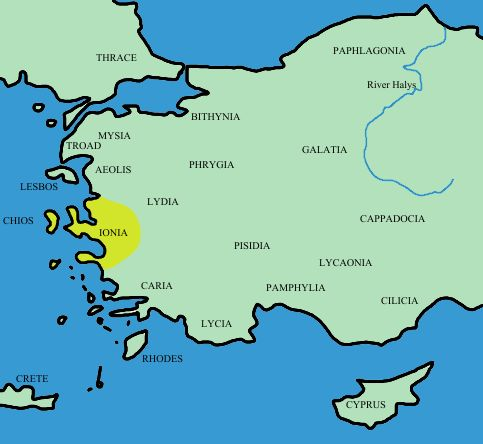
- Map of western Anatolia with Ionia shaded
- Location: Western Anatolia, Turkey
- State existed: 7th–6th centuries BC (as Ionian League)
- Language: Ionic Greek
- Largest city: Ephesus
- Persian satrapy: Yauna
- Roman province: Asia

Ionia (/aɪˈoʊni.ə/ eye-OH-nee-ə; Greek: Ιωνία) was an ancient region encompassing the central part of the western coast of Anatolia. It consisted of the northernmost territories of the Ionian League of Greek settlements. Never a unified state, it was named after the Ionians who had settled in the region before the archaic period.

Ionia proper comprised a narrow coastal strip from Phocaea in the north near the mouth of the river Hermus (now the Gediz), to Miletus in the south near the mouth of the river Maeander, and included the islands of Chios and Samos. It was bounded by Aeolia to the north, Lydia to the east and Caria to the south. The cities within the region figured significantly in the strife between the Persian Empire and the Greeks.

Ionian cities were identified by mythic traditions of kinship and by their use of the Ionic dialect, but there was a core group of twelve Ionian cities that formed the Ionian League and had a shared sanctuary and festival at Panionion. These twelve cities were (from south to north): Miletus, Myus, Priene, Ephesus, Colophon, Lebedos, Teos, Erythrae, Clazomenae and Phocaea, together with the islands of Samos and Chios. Smyrna, originally an Aeolic colony, was afterwards occupied by Ionians from Colophon, and became an Ionian city.

The Ionian school of philosophy, centered on 6th century BC Miletus, was characterized by a focus on non-supernatural explanations for natural phenomena and a search for rational explanations of the universe, thereby laying the foundation for scientific inquiry and rational thought in Western philosophy.

== Geography ==
Greek settlements in western Asia Minor, Ionian area in green.

Ionia was of small extent, not exceeding 150 kilometres (90 mi) in length from north to south, with the cities located on a narrow band between the sea and the mountains, which varies in width from 60 to 90 kilometres (40 to 60 mi). So intricate is the coastline that the voyage along its shores was estimated at nearly four times the direct distance. The location of the eastern border with Lydia and Caria was vague in antiquity.

The region comprised three extremely fertile valleys formed by the outflow of three rivers, among the most considerable in Asia Minor: the Hermus in the north, flowing into the Gulf of Smyrna, though at some distance from the city of that name; the Caÿster (modern Küçük Menderes River), which flowed past Ephesus; and the Maeander, which in ancient times discharged its waters into a deep gulf between Priene and Miletus, but which has been gradually filled up by this river's deposits.

Two east–west mountain ranges divide the region and extend out into the Aegean as peninsulas. The first begins as Mount Sipylus between the Hermus and Caÿster river valleys and continues out as the Erythrae peninsula, which faces the island of Chios. The second is the Messogis range between the Caÿster and Maeander ranges, which becomes the Mycale peninsula, which reaches out towards the island of Samos. None of these mountain ranges exceed 1,200 metres (3,940 ft).

Ionia enjoyed the reputation in ancient times of being the most fertile region of Asia Minor. Herodotus declares "in terms of climate and weather, there is no fairer region in the whole world."

== Etymology ==
The etymology of the word Ἴωνες (Íōnes) or Ἰᾱ́ϝoνες (Iā́wones) is uncertain. Various hypotheses have been proposed to explain its origins. Frisk suggests that it stems from an unknown root, *Ia-, which would be pronounced as *ya-. There are several alternative hypotheses as well:

- The word may have originated from a Proto-Indo-European onomatopoeic root *wi- or *woi-, which conveyed a shout made by individuals rushing to help others. Another proposition, put forth by Pokorny, suggests that *Iāwones could signify "devotees of Apollo," based on the cry iḕ paiṓn uttered in his worship; the god was also called iḕios himself.
- The word may have derived from an early name associated with an unknown nation inhabiting an Eastern Mediterranean island. This population was referred to as ḥꜣw-nbwt in ancient Egyptian, indicating the people residing in that region. However, the exact nature of this early name and its connection to the term Ἴωνες remains uncertain.
- It may have come from a Proto-Indo-European root *uiH-, meaning "power".

The term Ἰᾱ́ϝoνες (Iā́wones) in turn became the source for words for Greeks in many languages of the Near East, compare Aramaic 𐡉𐡅𐡍𐡉𐡍 (*Yawnayīn), Hebrew יָוָן (yāwān), Arabic يُونَان (yūnān), Demotic Egyptian wynn (/wəjˈniːn/) and Coptic ⲟⲩⲁⲓⲛⲓⲛ (ouainin).

== History ==
=== Late Bronze Age ===
==== Hittite period ====
There is no evidence for a people explicitly called “Ionians” in Late Bronze Age Anatolia.

From the 14th century BC the Great Kingdom of Arzawa was conquered by Suppiluliuma I and it became a vassal of the Hittite Empire.

The city of Ephesus (Hittite Apasa) appears to have been the capital of Arzawa around 1320 BCE, when it rebelled against Mursili II of Hatti. Following the rebellion the great kingdom of Arzawa was carved up into smaller kingdoms, with Arzawa restricted to the region of Ephesus.

An important city was Miletus (Hittite Millawanda/Milawata), ruled by a provincial governor. Miletus, along with several other settlements that were originally founded by non-Greek populations, later received significant Mycenaean Greek settlers during the Late Bronze Age. Miletus was at times allied with the King of Ahhiyawa,identified as the Homeric Achaeans.

In the early 12th century BCE, deterioration of climate contributed to the fall of the Hittite Empire saw cities in Asia Minor destroyed by invaders.

=== Iron Age ===
Ionia was settled by the Greeks probably during the 11th century BC. Greek settlement of Ionia seems to have accelerated following the Bronze Age collapse, but the lack of contemporary sources makes the sequence of events unclear.

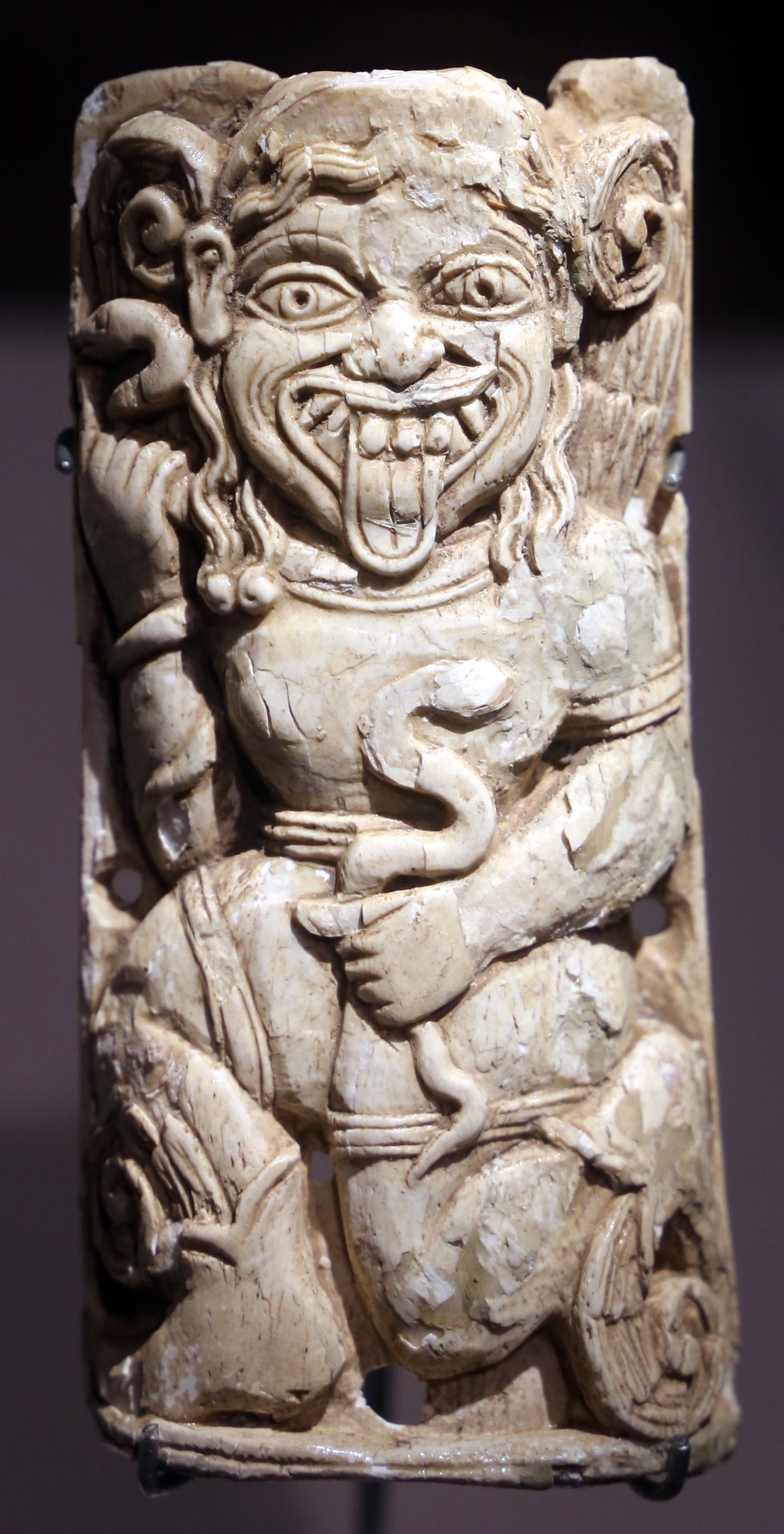
Gorgone with serpent, Ionia, 575-550 BC.

The ancient Greeks believed that the Ionians were the descendants of Ion (either a son or grandson of Hellen, the mythical ancestor of the Greeks) and had migrated from Greece to Asia Minor in mythic times. The story is attested from the Classical period. Herodotus states that in Asia the Ionians kept the division into twelve cities that had prevailed in Ionian lands of the north Peloponnese, their former homeland, which became Achaea after they left. However, the story of the migration is recounted most fully by the Roman-period authors Strabo and Pausanias. They report that the Ionians were expelled from the Peloponnese by Achaians, and were granted refuge in Athens by King Melanthus. Later, when Medon was selected as King of Athens, his brothers, the "sons of Codrus", led a group of Ionians and others to Asia Minor. Simultaneously, the Aeolians of Boeotia settled the coast to the north of the Ionians and the Dorians settled in Crete, the Dodecanese and in Caria.

According to Pausanias, the sons of Codrus were as follows:

- Neileus conquered Miletus from the Cretans. Pausanias and most other sources present Neileus as the overall leader of the Ionians.
- Androclus conquered Ephesus from the Leleges and Lydians, conquered Samos, and died defending Priene from Carians. Strabo says that Androclus was the leader of the Ionians and the only legitimate son of Codrus.
- Cyaretus took Myus from the Carians.
- Damasichthon and Promethus found the descendants of Thersander of Thebes at Colophon and settled alongside them, but later Promethus killed his brother and fled to Naxos.
- Andraemon conquered Lebedus from the Carians.
- Damasus and Naoclus settled at Teos, along with Boeotians led by Geres. The city had already been settled by Ionians under Apoecus (whose name literally means "founder") and Minyans who settled under Athamas.
- Cleopus gathered a group made up of equal portions from all the Ionian cities and settled them at Erythrae, where there were already Cretans, Lycians, Carians and Pamphylians.

Pausanias reports that other cities were founded or became Ionian later:

- Priene was founded by Neileus' son Aegyptus, along with Philotas, as a joint Ionian and Theban settlement.
- Clazomenae was founded by a group of Ionians, who received Parphorus, a descendant of Codrus from Colophon as their founder.
- Phocaea was founded by a group of Phocians from near Delphi, led by Philogenes and Damon of Athens and then received Deoetes, Periclus and Abartus, descendants of Codrus, as their kings in order to gain recognition as Ionians.
- Procles son of Pityreus of Epidaurus, a descendant of Ion, who had been expelled by Argos conquered Samos. Under his son Leogorus, the Ephesians under Androclus conquered the island and the Samians fled to Samothrace and to Anaea, but then reconquered Samos.
- Chios was settled by Cretans under Oenopion, then by Carians and Abantes from Euboea. Oenopion's grandson Hector drove them out and received a tripod and the right to sacrifice at the Panionion from the Ionians (Pausanias expresses uncertainty about how this made them Ionian).
- Smyrna had been conquered by the Aeolians, but was later conquered by the Colophonians.

=== Archaic period ===
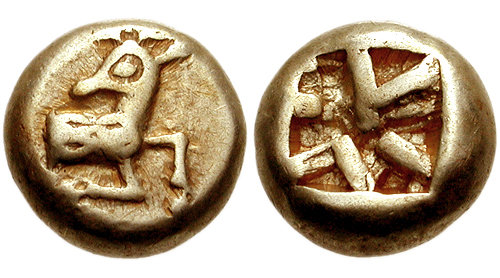
One of the earliest electrum coins struck in Ephesus, 620–600 BC. Obverse: Forepart of stag. Reverse: Square incuse punch.

In the Archaic period, "the Ionian poleis were among the cultural, intellectual, and political leaders of the Greek world." The region prospered economically due to the contributions of immigrants, traders, and other social classes from at least 750 BCE to well after 510 BCE.

==== Ionian League ====
The twelve Ionian cities formed a religious and cultural (as opposed to a political or military) confederacy, the Ionian League, of which participation in the Pan-Ionic festival was a distinguishing characteristic. This festival took place on the north slope of Mt. Mycale in a shrine called the Panionium. The foundation took place late in the Archaic period, but the exact date is unclear. This is also when stories of the Ionian migration are first attested. All of these initiatives were probably aimed at emphasising Ionian distinctiveness from other Greeks in Asia.

But the Ionian League was primarily a religious organisation rather than a political one. Although they did sometimes act together, civic interests and priorities always trumped broader Ionian ones. They never formed a real confederacy. The advice of Thales of Miletus to combine in a political union was rejected. In inscriptions and literary sources from this period, Ionians generally identify themselves by their city of origin, not as "Ionians."

==== Ionians overseas ====
The cities became prosperous. Miletus especially was, in an early period, one of the most important commercial cities of Greece, and in its turn became the parent of numerous other colonies, which extended all around the shores of the Euxine Sea and the Propontis from Abydus and Cyzicus to Trapezus and Panticapaeum. Phocaea was one of the first Greek cities whose mariners explored the shores of the western Mediterranean. From an early period, Ephesus, though it did not send out any colonies of importance, became a flourishing city.

In the eighth century, Ionian Greeks are recorded in Near Eastern sources as coastal raiders: an inscription of Sargon II (ca 709–07, recording a naval expedition of 715) boasts "in the midst of the sea" he had "caught the Ionians like fish and brought peace to the land of Que Cilicia and the city of Tyre". For a full generation earlier, Assyrian inscriptions had recorded troubles with the Ionians, who escaped on their boats.

==== Lydian rule ====
About 700 BC Gyges, first Mermnad king of Lydia, invaded the territories of Smyrna and Miletus, and is said to have taken Colophon. His son Ardys conquered Priene. In the middle of the 7th century, the Cimmerii ravaged a great part of Asia Minor, including Lydia, and sacked Magnesia on the Maeander, but were defeated when they attacked Ephesus. It was not until the reign of Croesus (560–545 BC) that the cities of Ionia fell completely under Lydian rule.

=== First Achaemenid rule ===
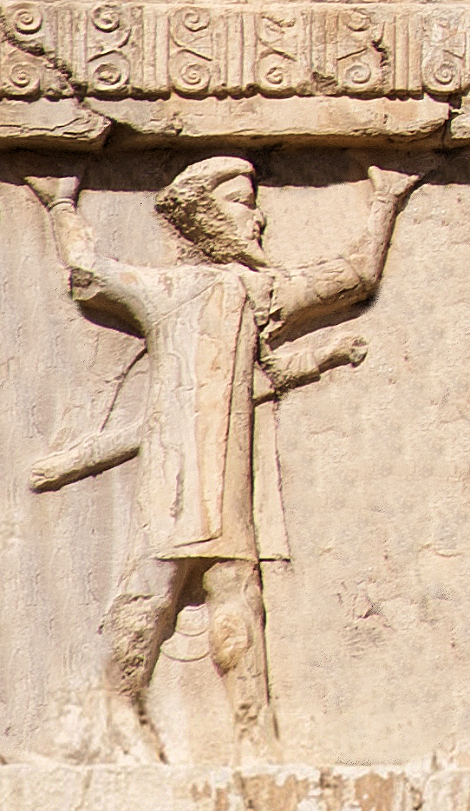
Ionian soldier of the Achaemenid army, c. 480 BCE.

The defeat of Croesus by Cyrus the Great was followed by the conquest of all the Ionian cities in 547 BC. These became subject to the Persian monarchy with the other Greek cities of Asia, forming part of the satrapy of Lydia. In this position they enjoyed a considerable amount of autonomy, but were subject to local despots (called "tyrants"), who were loyal to the Persian king.

Art and archaeology show that Ionia was characterised by "openness and adaptability" towards the Lydians, Persians, and their eastern neighbours in this period. Lydian products and luxury objects were widespread.

The Persians used "Yaunā" (Ionian) as a catch-all term for all Greeks, dividing them into "Yaunā of the mainland" in Asia Minor, "Yaunā dwelling by the sea" in the Aegean islands, "Yaunā dwelling across the sea" in the Greek mainland, and "Yaunā with shields on their heads" in Macedonia.

==== Ionian revolt ====
It was at the instigation of one of the tyrants, Histiaeus of Miletus, that in about 500 BC the principal cities ignited the Ionian Revolt against Persia. They were at first assisted by the Athenians and Eretria, with whose aid they penetrated into the interior and burnt Sardis, an event which ultimately led to the Persian invasion of Greece. But the fleet of the Ionians was defeated off the island of Lade, and the destruction of Miletus after a protracted siege was followed by the reconquest of all the Asiatic Greeks, insular as well as continental.

=== Athenian empire ===
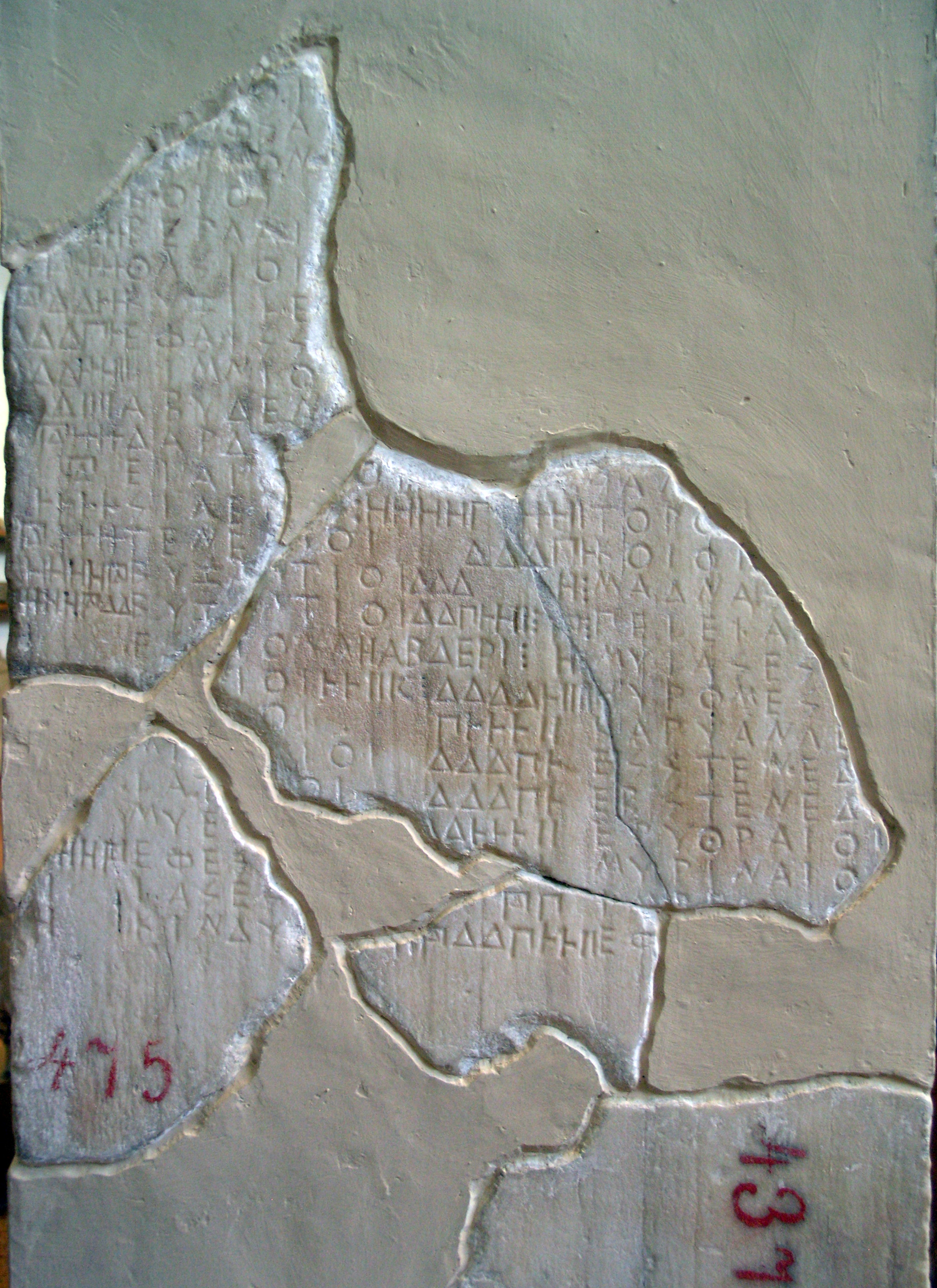
The Ionic section of the Athenian tribute list for 454/3 BC.

The victories of the Greeks during the Persian invasion of Greece and the liberation of Thrace, Macedon, and Ionia from the Persian Empire had the effect of enfranchising their kinsmen on the other side of the Aegean, and the Battle of Mycale (479 BC), in which the defeat of the Persians was in great measure owing to the Ionians, secured their emancipation. They henceforth became the dependent allies of Athens within the Delian League. In the Athenian tribute lists, one of the regions of the empire is the Ionikos phoros, a region that includes the cities of Ionia, but also Aeolis and Mysia to the north. Caria to the south was initially its own region, but was folded into the Ionikos phoros in 438 BC.

The Athenians advanced an expansive definition of Ionian identity, which included most of the communities under their control and emphasised common descent from Athens. This was probably intended to legitimise their rule over the region. It clashed with the restrictive definition of Ionian identity that was maintained by the Ionian League.

Herodotus, who came from Halicarnassus, a Dorian city in southwestern Asia Minor which was also part of the Athenian Empire, writes in opposition to the Ionian League's claims that "it would be stupid to say that they are more truly Ionian or better born ...." He lists other ethnic populations among the settlers: Abantes from Euboea, Minyans from Orchomenus, Cadmeians, Dryopians, Phocians, Molossians, Arcadian Pelasgians, Dorians of Epidaurus, and others. Even "the best born of the Ionians" had married girls from Caria. He defines Ionians as all peoples who were descended from Athenians and celebrated the Apaturia festival, which aligns with the expansive Athenian definition of Ionian identity.

=== Satrapy (387–335 BC) ===
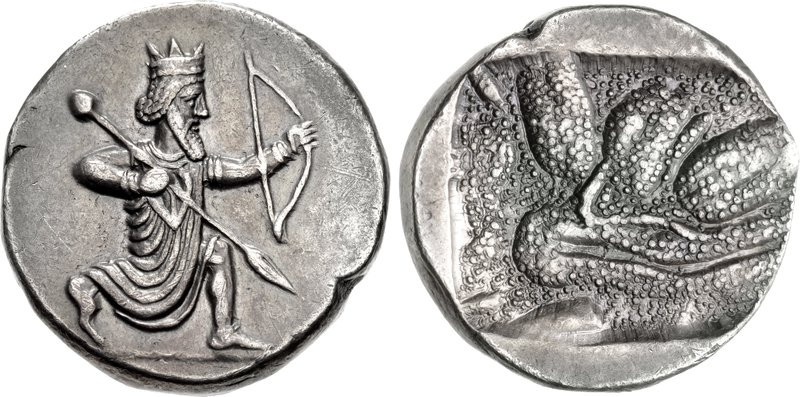
Ionia, Achaemenid Period. Uncertain satrap. Circa 350–333 BC

The Spartans dissolved the Athenian Empire at the end of the Peloponnesian War in 404 BC. The Spartans installed harmosts (governors) in the cities, but had to withdraw them because they had promised Ionia and the other Greek communities in Asia to the Persians. In 401, the Ionian cities and Sparta supported Cyrus the Younger, the Persian overlord of Asia Minor, in his attempt to seize the throne from his brother, King Artaxerxes II but he failed. Artaxerxes tasked Tissaphernes, the satrap of Lydia and Caria, with retaking the Ionian cities, and the Spartans opposed him.

In 396 BC, Agesilaus led a large expedition to Asia Minor to defend the cities and attack the Persians, which landed in Ephesus. From there he invaded Phrygia and Lydia, sacking Sardis in 395 BC. But the outbreak of the Corinthian War forced him to withdraw in 395 BC.

The region was under Persian control by about 390 BC, when the Persian satrap arbitrated a boundary dispute between Miletus and Myus. Sparta, Athens, and the other mainland Greek states formally acknowledged Persian possession of Ionia and the other Greek cities in Asia Minor in the Peace of Antalcidas in 387 BC. In this period, Ionia was a separate satrapy, rather than part of Lydia – the only time in the region's history that formed an administrative unit. Ionian cities appear to have retained a considerable amount of autonomy until the conquest of Asia Minor by Alexander the Great in 335 BC.

=== Hellenistic period ===
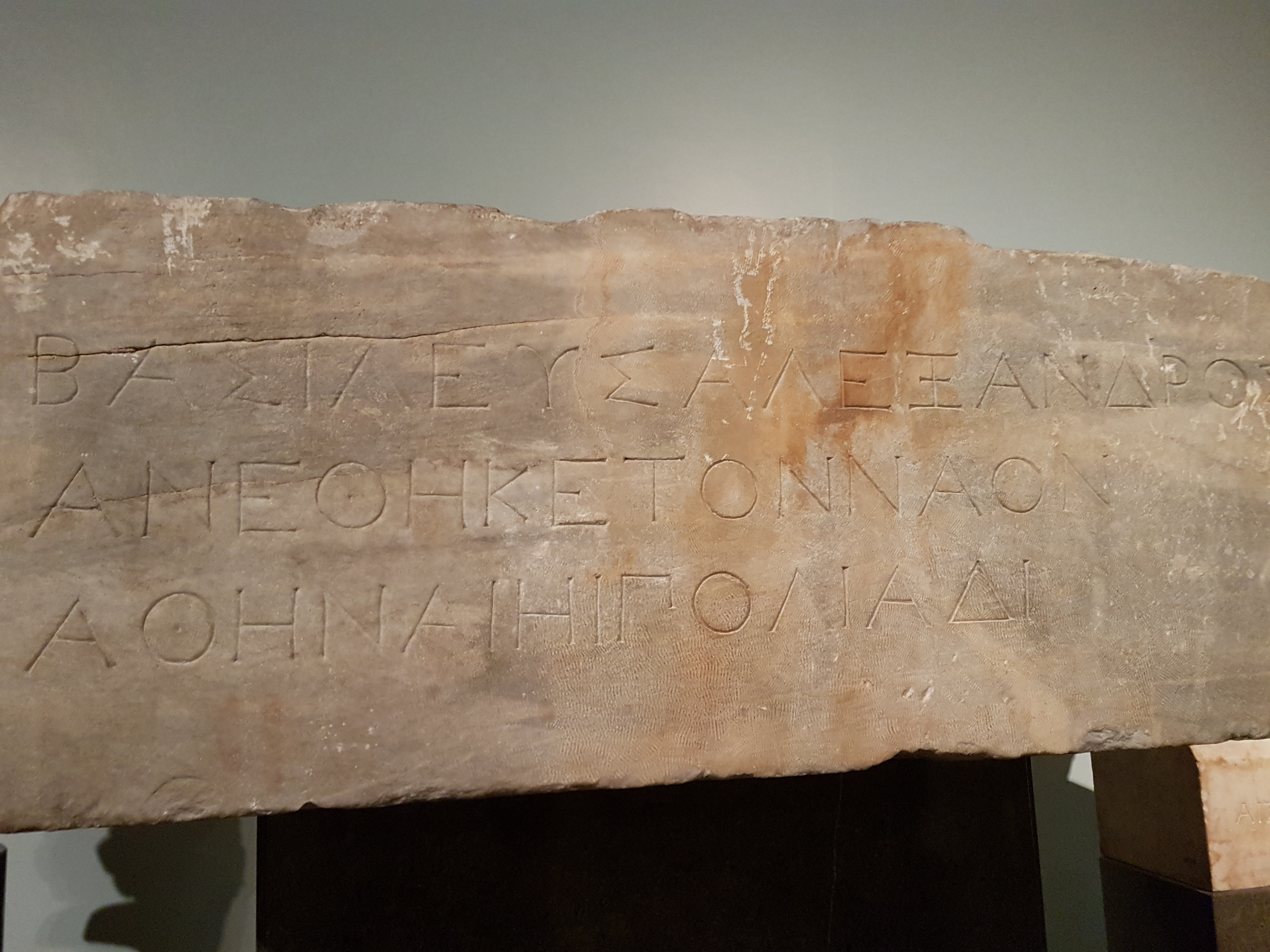
Inscription from the Temple of Athena Polias at Priene, identifying Alexander the Great as the temple's funder.

Ephesus was conquered by Philip II of Macedon in 336 BC in preparation for the invasion of Persia, which took place under his son Alexander the Great. After the battle of the Granicus in 334 BC most of the Ionian cities submitted to Alexander, except for Miletus, which was taken only after a long siege. Alexander presented his invasion as a liberation of the Greeks of Asia and therefore treated the Ionians generously, granting them freedom, autonomy, and tax-free status.

In the conflict that broke out between Alexander's successors after his death in 323 BC and throughout the Hellenistic Age that followed, Ionia was a contested territory, divided between the Antigonid, Seleucid, and Ptolemaic kingdoms. Cities were regularly forced to switch allegiance from one monarch to another, but they were also able to play the kings off against one another in order to get better terms for themselves. Despite the political situation, the Ionian League continued to operate throughout the period.

Following their victory in the War with Antiochus in 189 BC, the Romans placed Ionia under the control of the Attalid Kingdom, which retained the region until it was annexed by Rome in 133 BC.

One of the major theatrical associations of the Hellenistic period was the Synod of the Dionysiac Artists of Ionia and the Hellespont, which was established around 250 BC and had its headquarters successively in Teos, Ephesus, Myonnesus, and Lebedus.

=== Roman empire ===
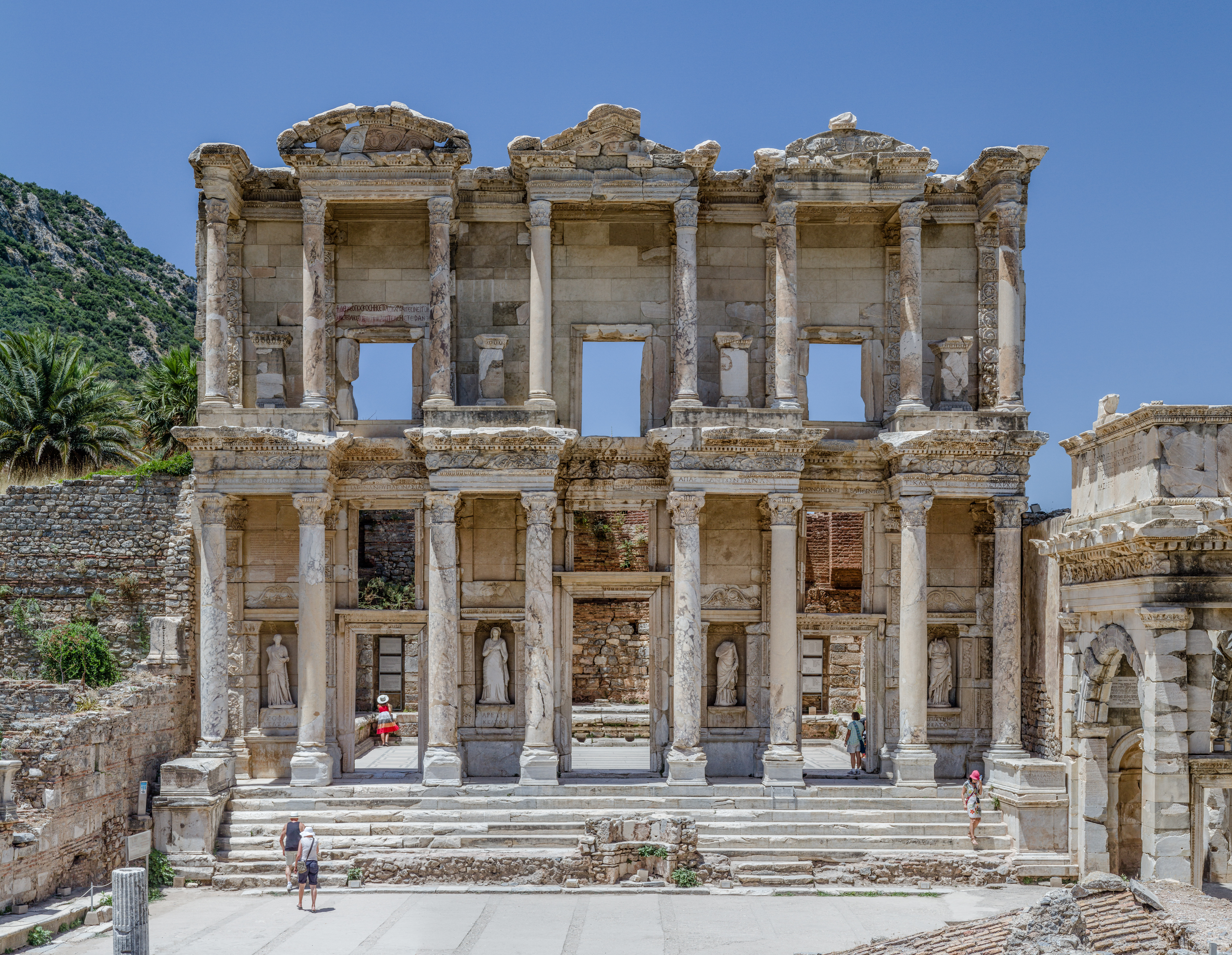
The Library of Celsus in Ephesus was built in 114–117, during the Roman Imperial period.

Ionia became part of the Roman province of Asia in 133 BC, which had its capital at the Ionian city of Ephesus. Ionia had no formal place in the Roman administration of the province, which was divided into conventus districts that were totally distinct from the traditional ethnic divisions of the region. However, the Ionian League continued to function in this period.

The geographer Strabo treats Ionia as the narrow coastal strip from the Hermus river in the north to the Maeander river in the south (though noting that other authorities included the plain south of the river). He treats Ephesus as its most important city and presents an unbroken tradition of intellectual culture in the region stretching from the Archaic philosophers down to his own day – in contrast to the intellectual life of mainland Greece, which he presents as a thing of the past. Other authors sometimes use "Ionia" as a metonym for the whole province of Asia.

Decreased political agency for the Greek cities under Rome, led to increased focus on cultural identity as a source of civic prestige. In the fierce rivalries that raged between the cities of the Province of Asia in the Roman Imperial period, Ionian cities emphasised their Ionian identity as "one of the purest, 'primordial' forms of Greekness," while their rivals denounced Ionians as overly influenced by oriental luxury and recalled their support for the Persians in the late fifth and early fourth centuries BC. Most sources discussing Ionian founding myths belong to this period. Ionian cities retained local month names and continued to count years by eponymous magistrates rather than adopting era dating like most other cities in Asia Minor. Distinctive Ionian personal names remained common.

=== Medieval and modern history ===
Greeks continued to live in Ionia through the Roman, Byzantine and Ottoman Empires but were forced to vacate the region in 1922 after the events of the Greek genocide which culminated with the population exchange between Turkey and Greece. The suburbs of Nea Ionia and Nea Smyrni were primarily settled by refugees from Ionia and still maintain an Ionian identity.

== Legacy ==
From the 7th century BC, Ionia, and in particular Miletus, was home to the Ionian school of philosophy. The Ionian school, founded by Thales and his student Anaximander, pioneered a revolution in traditional thinking about Nature. Instead of explaining natural phenomena by recourse to traditional religion/myth, the cultural climate was such that men began to form hypotheses about the natural world based on ideas gained from both personal experience and deep reflection. According to physicist Carlo Rovelli, this was the "first great scientific revolution" and the earliest example of critical thinking, which would come to define Greek, and subsequently modern, thought.

Ionia has a long roll of distinguished men of letters and science (notably the Ionian School of philosophy) and distinct school of art. This school flourished between 700 and 500 BC. The great names of this school are Theodorus and Rhoecus of Samos; Bathycles of Magnesia on the Maeander; Glaucus of Chios, Melas, Micciades, Archermus, Bupalus and Athenis of Chios. Notable works of the school still extant are the famous archaic female statues found on the Athenian Acropolis in 1885–1887, the seated statues of Branchidae, the Nike of Archermus found at Delos, and the objects in ivory and electrum found by D. G. Hogarth in the lower strata of the Artemision at Ephesus.

The Persian designation for Greek is Younan (یونان), a transliteration of "Ionia", through Old Persian Yauna. The same is true for the Hebrew word, "Yavan" (יוון) and the Sanskrit word "yavana". The word was later adopted in Arabic, Turkish, and Urdu as well as in other places.

== Literary references ==
Ionia appears as the major setting in these novels:

- The Ionia Sanction (2011), by Gary Corby
- The Ionian Mission (1981), by Patrick O'Brian

Many scholars believe the biblical Yavan refers to the alleged ancestor of the ancient peoples of Ionia.

== See also ==
- Ancient regions of Anatolia
- Regions of ancient Greece
- Ionians
- List of traditional Greek place names
- Population exchange between Greece and Turkey

== Bibliography ==
- Herodotus; Histories, A. D. Godley (translator), Cambridge, Massachusetts: Harvard University Press, 1920; ISBN 0-674-99133-8. Online version at the Perseus Digital Library.
- Jan Paul Crielaard, "The Ionians in the Archaic period: Shifting identities in a changing world," in Ton Derks, Nico Roymans (ed.), Ethnic Constructs in Antiquity: The Role of Power and Tradition (Amsterdam, Amsterdam University Press, 2009) (Amsterdam Archaeological Studies, 13), 37–84.
- Gorman, Vanessa B. (2001). Miletos, the ornament of Ionia: A History of the City to 400 B.C.E. Ann Arbor, Michigan: University of Michigan Press. ISBN 978-0472037773.
- Greaves, Alan M. (2010). The land of Ionia: society and economy in the Archaic period. Malden, Massachusetts: Wiley-Blackwell. ISBN 9781444319224.
- Hallmannsecker, Martin (2022). Roman Ionia: Constructions of Cultural Identity in Western Asia Minor. Cambridge, United Kingdom: CUP. ISBN 9781009150194.
- Herrmann, P. (2002). "Das Koinon ton Ionon unter römischer Herrschaft". In Ehrhardt, N.; Günther, L.-M. (eds.). Widerstand, Anpassung, Integration: die griechische Staatenwelt und Rom: Festschrift für Jürgen Deininger zum 65. Geburtstag (in German). Stuttgart, Germany: Steiner. pp. 223–242. ISBN 9783515079112.
- Ma, John (1999). Antiochos III and the Cities of Western Asia Minor. London, England: Oxford University Press. ISBN 0198152191.
- Mac Sweeney, Naoíse (2013). Foundation Myths and Politics in Ancient Ionia. Cambridge, England: Cambridge University Press. ISBN 9781107037496.
- Mac Sweeney, Naoíse (2021). "Regional Identities in the Greek World: Myth and Koinon in Ionia". Historia: Zeitschrift für Alte Geschichte. 70 (3): 268. doi:10.25162/HISTORIA-2021-0011. S2CID 237987402.
- Mariaud, Olivier (2020). "Ionia". In Lemos, Irene S.; Kotsonas, Antonios (eds.). A Companion to the Archaeology of Early Greece and the Mediterranean. Hoboken, New Jersey. pp. 961–984. ISBN 9781118770191.
- Thonemann, Peter (2015). The Maeander Valley: A Historical Geography from Antiquity to Byzantium (First paperback ed.). Cambridge, England: Cambridge University Press. ISBN 978-1107538139.
