= Antimachus of Teos =

Ancient Greek poet

Antimachus of Teos (Greek: Ἀντίμαχος ὁ Τήϊος) was an early Greek epic poet. According to Plutarch, he observed a solar eclipse in 753 BC, the same year in which Rome was founded. The epic Epigoni, a sequel to the legend of Thebes, was apparently sometimes ascribed to Antimachus of Teos. However, confusion is possible with the much later literary poet Antimachus of Colophon (c. 400 BC), who wrote an epic Thebais on what must have been an overlapping subject.

== Select editions and translations ==
=== Critical editions ===
- Kinkel, G. (1877), Epicorum Graecorum fragmenta, vol. 1, Leipzig.
- Allen, T.W. (1912), Homeri opera. Tomus V: Hymni, Cyclus, Fragmenta, Margites, Batrachomyomachia, Vitae, Oxford, ISBN 0-19-814534-9.
- Bernabé, A. (1988), Poetae epici Graecae, vol. pars i, Leipzig, ISBN 978-3-598-71706-2.
- Davies, M. (1988), Epicorum Graecorum fragmenta, Göttingen, ISBN 978-3-525-25747-0.

=== Translations ===
- Evelyn-White, Hugh G. (1936), Hesiod, the Homeric Hymns, and Homerica, Loeb Classical Library (3rd rev. ed.), Cambridge, Massachusetts, ISBN 978-0-674-99063-0. (The link is to the 1st edition of 1914.) English translation with facing Greek text; now obsolete except for its translations of the ancient quotations.
- West, M.L. (2003), Greek Epic Fragments, Loeb Classical Library, Cambridge, Massachusetts, ISBN 978-0-674-99605-2. Greek text with facing English translation

== Sources ==
- Davies, M. (1989), Greek Epic Cycle, London, ISBN 978-1853990397.
