= Damasichthon =

Damasichthon (Ancient Greek: Δαμασίχθων) is a name that refers to the following figures in Greek mythology and legendary history:

- Damasichthon, one of the Niobids, children of Niobe and Amphion, who paid for their mother's hubris with their lives.
- Damasichthon, grandson of Peneleos and successor to Autesion.
- Damasichthon, son of King Codrus of Athens.
