= Antimachus =

Ancient Greek poet

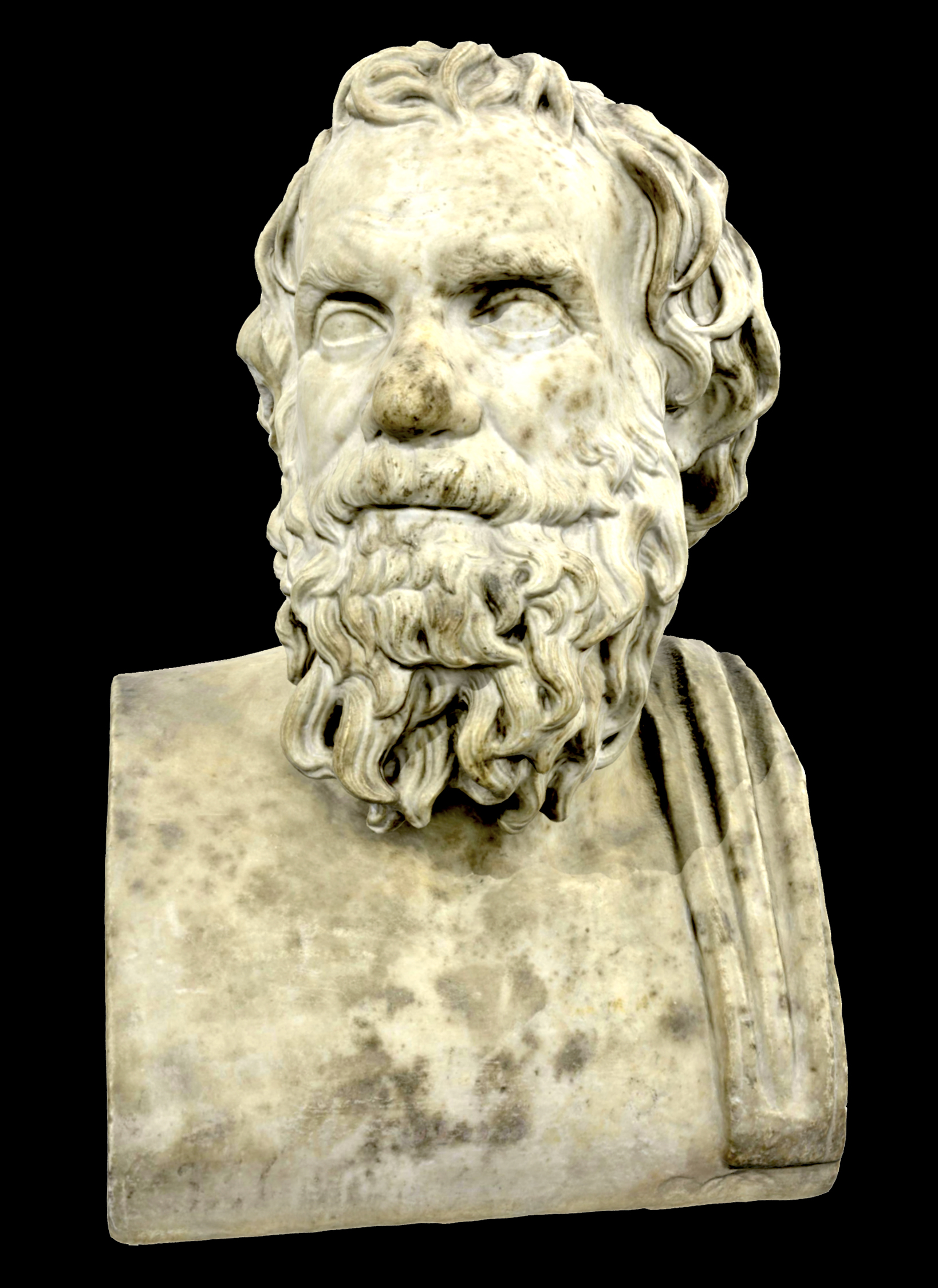
Herm of Antimachus from Colophon

Antimachus of Colophon (Greek: Ἀντίμαχος ὁ Κολοφώνιος), or of Claros, was a Greek poet and grammarian, who flourished about 400 BC.

== Life ==
Scarcely anything is known of his life. The Suda claims that he was a pupil of the poets Panyassis and Stesimbrotus.

== Work ==
His poetical efforts were not generally appreciated, although he received encouragement from his younger contemporary Plato (Plutarch, Lysander, 18). The emperor Hadrian, however, would later consider him superior to Homer.

His chief works were: an epic Thebaid, an account of the expedition of the Seven against Thebes and the war of the Epigoni; and an elegiac poem Lyde, so called from the poet's mistress, for whose death he endeavoured to find consolation telling stories from mythology of heroic disasters (Plutarch, Consul, ad Apoll. 9; Athenaeus xiii. 597).

Antimachus was the founder of "learned" epic poetry, and the forerunner of the Alexandrian school, whose critics allotted him the next place to Homer. He also prepared a critical recension of the Homeric poems.

He is to be distinguished from Antimachus of Teos, a much earlier poet to whom the lost Cyclic epic Epigoni was apparently ascribed (though the attribution may result from confusion).

== Bibliography ==
- Fragments, ed. Stoll (1845); Bergk
- Poetae Lyrici Graeci (1882); Kinkel
- Fragmenta epicorum Graecorum (1877). 20th century ed: V.J. Matthews
- Antimachus of Colophon, text and commentary (Leiden : Brill, 1996) ISBN 90-04-10468-2
