= List of oracular statements from Delphi =

Statements which have survived from various sources referring to the oracle at Delphi

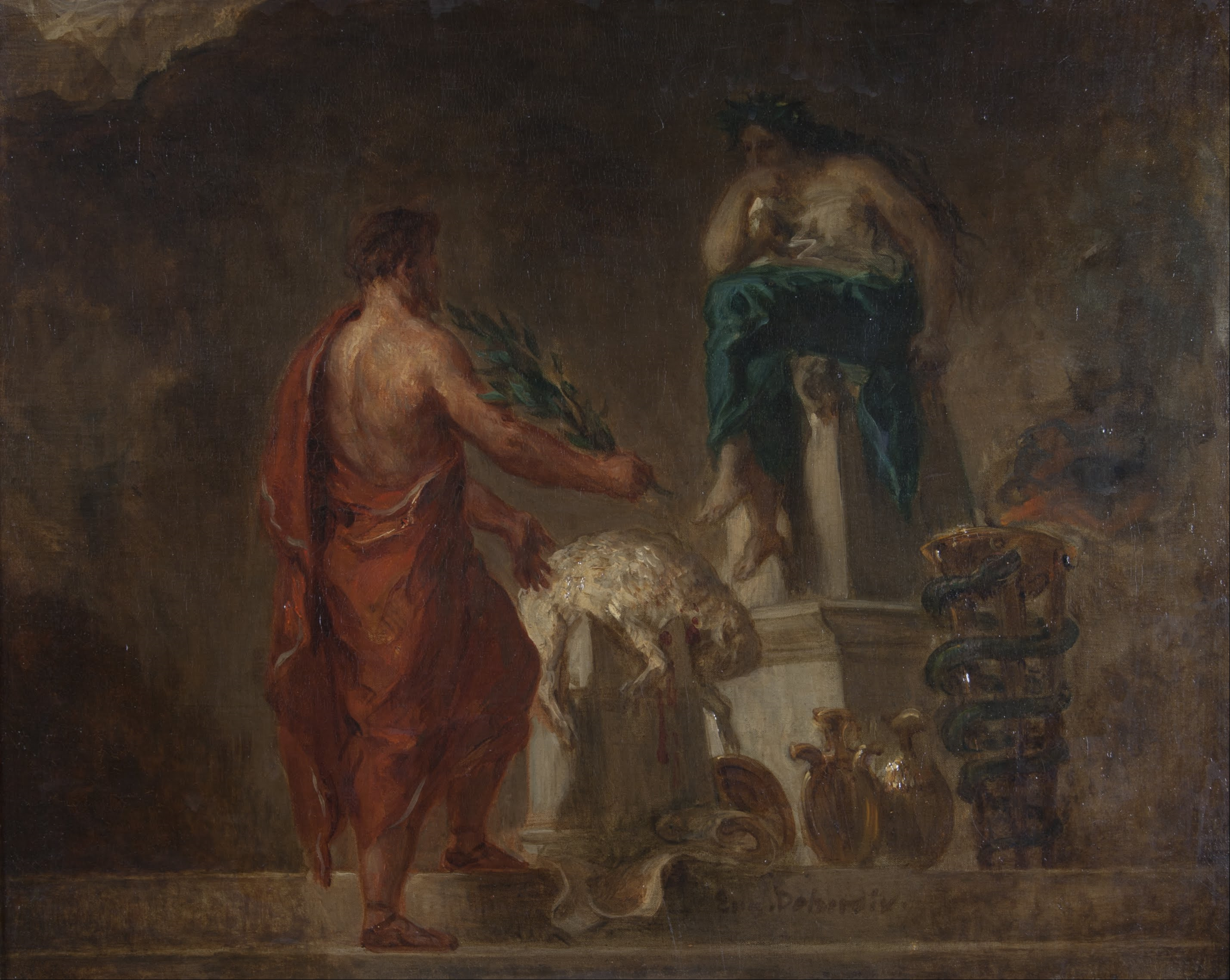
Lycurgus Consulting the Pythia (1835/1845), as imagined by Eugène Delacroix.

Pythia was the priestess presiding over the Oracle of Apollo at Delphi. There are more than 500 supposed oracular statements which have survived from various sources referring to the oracle at Delphi. Many are anecdotal, and have survived as proverbs. Several are ambiguously phrased, apparently in order to show the oracle in a good light regardless of the outcome. Such prophecies were admired for their dexterity of phrasing. The following list presents some of the most prominent and historically significant prophecies of Delphi.

== Archaic period ==
=== Lycurgus ===
Some early oracular statements from Delphi may have been delivered to Lycurgus, the semi-legendary Spartan lawgiver (fl. 8th century BC).

According to the report by Herodotus (Histories A.65, 2–4), Lycurgus visited and consulted the oracle before he applied his new laws to Sparta,

"You have come to my rich temple, Lycurgus,/ A man dear to Zeus and to all who have Olympian homes./ I am in doubt whether to pronounce you man or god,/ But I think rather you are a god, Lycurgus."

Some say that the Pythia also declared to him the constitution that now exists at Sparta, but the Lacedaemonians themselves say that Lycurgus brought it from Crete when he was guardian of his nephew Leobetes, the Spartan king.

Both Xenophon and Plutarch also attribute to Lycurgus the introduction of a very cumbersome coinage made from iron (in order to prevent attachment to wealth). In the account of Plutarch and Diodorus, this was also based on an oracular statement,

"Love of money and nothing else will ruin Sparta."

The supposed oracular statement in retrospect was interpreted as being fulfilled, as the gold and silver Sparta's soldiers sent home after the Peloponnesian War were to prove to be Sparta's undoing, according to Plutarch. It is not likely that this oracle was delivered, if it is at all historical, to Lycurgus himself, as coinage had not been introduced in his time.

=== 630 BC ===
In 630 BC, the king of the island of Thera went to Delphi to offer a gift on behalf of his native city, and was told by the oracle:

that he should found a city in Libya.

Because the king did not know where Libya was, he did nothing. Thera was later affected by drought, the Therans again approached the oracle who said:

if they ... would make a settlement at Cyrene in Libya, things would go better with them.

Following the advice of the oracle, the Therans sought advice from the Cretans as to where Libya was and a colony of Thera was established at Platea. But bad luck still followed them for another two years, so they visited the oracle a third time. She said:

Know you better than I, fair Libya abounding in fleeces? Better the stranger than he who has trod it? Oh! Clever Therans!

The Therans sought advice from the local Libyans who gave them a new site, and the colony prospered.

=== 595 BC ===
In 595 BC, the affairs of the Oracle were felt too important to be left to the Delphians alone, and the sanctity of the site came to be protected by the Amphictyonic League, a league of 12 cities in existence since 1100 BC. In that year, nearby Kirra levied a toll on pilgrims, which ushered in the First Sacred War. After 5 years of struggle, the Oracle decreed that the site of Kirra be left fallow, sacred to Apollo. This ushered in a period of great prosperity.

=== 594 BC ===
In 594 BC, Solon, the Athenian lawgiver, seeking to capture the island of Salamis from Megara and Cirrha was told by the oracle:

First sacrifice to the warriors who once had their home in this island,

Whom now the rolling plain of fair Asopia covers,

Laid in the tombs of heroes with their faces turned to the sunset,

He did, and taking as volunteers 500 young Athenians whose ancestors came from Salamis, was successful in capturing the island that was to prove so important in later Athenian history. Solon never ceased to support and give credit to the oracle for its support in declaring the island was originally Ionian.

In framing his famous constitutional reforms for Athens, Solon again sought the advice of the oracle who told him:

Seat yourself now amidships, for you are the pilot of Athens. Grasp the helm fast in your hands; you have many allies in your city.

As a result, Solon refused the opportunity to become a revolutionary tyrant, and created a constitution for which he, and Athens, were justly honoured. Through trial by jury, a graduated tax system and the forgiveness of debts he prevented a growing gap between the "haves" and the "have-nots". But he refused to accept the confiscations of the property of the rich, so creating an Athenian middle class. He secured an Oath from the Athenian Council of Magistrates that if they violated these laws, they would dedicate a gold statue to the Oracle of Delphi of equal weight to themselves.

=== 560 BC ===
In 560 BC, Croesus of Lydia, in a trial of oracles, consulted all the famous oracles as to what he was doing on an appointed day. According to Herodotus, the oracle proclaimed:

οἶδα δ'ἐγὼ ψάμμου τ᾽ ἀριθμὸν καὶ μέτρα θαλάσσης,
καὶ κωφοῦ συνίημι, καὶ οὐ φωνεῦντος ἀκούω.
ὀδμή μ᾽ ἐς φρένας ἦλθε κραταιρίνοιο χελώνης
ἑψομένης ἐν χαλκῷ ἅμ᾽ ἀρνείοισι κρέεσσιν,
ᾗ χαλκὸς μὲν ὑπέστρωται, χαλκὸν δ᾽ ἐπιέσται.

[Translation: I know the number of the sand and the measure of the sea;
I understand the speech of the dumb and hear the voiceless.
The smell has come to my sense of a hard-shelled tortoise
being cooked with a lamb's flesh in a bronze pot:
bronze is the cauldron underneath, and bronze is the lid.]

Delphi was declared the winner. Croesus then asked if he should make war on the Persians and if he should take to himself any allied force. The oracles to whom he sent this question included those at Delphi and Thebes. Both oracles gave the same response, that if Croesus made war on the Persians, he would destroy a mighty empire. They further advised him to seek out the most powerful Greek peoples and make alliance with them.

Croesus paid a high fee to the Delphians and then sent to the oracle asking "Would his monarchy last long?" The Pythia answered:

ἀλλ᾽ ὅταν ἡμίονος βασιλεὺς Μήδοισι γένηται,
καὶ τότε, Λυδὲ ποδαβρέ, πολυψήφιδα παρ᾽ Ἕρμον
φεύγειν μηδὲ μένειν μηδ᾽ αἰδεῖσθαι κακὸς εἶναι.

[Translation: Whenever a mule shall become sovereign king of the Medians,
then, Lydian Delicate-Foot, flee by the stone-strewn Hermus,
flee, and think not to stand fast, nor shame to be chicken-hearted.]

Croesus thought it impossible that a mule should be king of the Medes and thus believed that he and his issue would never be out of power. He thus decided to make common cause with certain Greek city-states and attack Persia.

However, it was his empire, not that of the Persians, that was defeated, fulfilling the prophecy but not his interpretation of it. He apparently forgot that Cyrus, the victor, was half Mede (by his mother), half Persian (by his father), and therefore could be considered a "mule".

In Bacchylides' ode, composed for Hiero of Syracuse, who won the chariot race at Olympia in 468, Croesus with his wife and family mounted the funeral pyre, but before the flames could envelop the king, he was snatched up by Apollo and spirited away to the Hyperboreans. Herodotus' version includes Apollo in more "realistic" mode: Cyrus, repenting of the immolation of Croesus, could not put out the flames until Apollo intervened. (Note: Just such an intervention in extinguishing a funeral pyre was adapted by Christian hagiographers as a conventional literary topos in the martyrdom of saints.)

=== circa 550 BC ===
In his biography of Pythagoras in his Lives and Opinions of Eminent Philosophers, Diogenes Laërtius (3rd century AD) cites the statement of Aristoxenus (4th century BC) that Themistoclea taught Pythagoras his moral doctrines:

Aristoxenus says that Pythagoras got most of his moral doctrines from the Delphic priestess Themistoclea.

Porphyry (233–305 AD) calls her Aristoclea (Aristokleia), although there is little doubt that he is referring to the same person. Porphyry repeats the claim that she was the teacher of Pythagoras:

He (Pythagoras) taught much else, which he claimed to have learned from Aristoclea at Delphi.

Herodotus at 1.66 in his history of the Persian Wars reports that the Spartans consulted Delphi about their plans to invade the lands of their neighbors, the Arcadians and their city of Tegea. The Pythia replied:

You ask me for Arcadia? You ask too much; I grant it not. There are many men in Arcadia, eaters of acorns, who will hinder you. But I grudge you not. I will give you Tegea to beat with your feet in dancing, and its fair plain to measure with a rope.

=== circa 525 BC ===
Herodotus states that during the time of the founding of the Siphnian Treasury, the Siphnians were told:

"... When the Prytanies' seat shines white in the island of Siphnos, White-browed all the forum – need then of a true seer's wisdom – Danger will threat from a wooden boat, and a herald in scarlet ..."

== Classical Period ==
=== 480 BC ===
In 480 BC, when Xerxes, the son of Darius the Great of Persia, returned to finish the job of conquering the Greeks in which his father had failed, the Athenians consulted the oracle. They were told:

Now your statues are standing and pouring sweat. They shiver with dread. The black blood drips from the highest rooftops. They have seen the necessity of evil. Get out, get out of my sanctum and drown your spirits in woe.

When persuaded to seek advice a second time, the oracle gave a way for the Athenians to escape their doom. When Athena approached her father to help her city, Zeus responded that he would grant that "a wall of wood alone shall be uncaptured, a boon to you and your children."

The oracle again advised the Athenians to flee:

Await not in quiet the coming of the horses, the marching feet, the armed host upon the land. Slip away. Turn your back. You will meet in battle anyway. O holy Salamis, you will be the death of many a woman's son between the seedtime and the harvest of the grain.

Meanwhile, the Spartans also consulted the oracle and were told:

The strength of bulls or lions cannot stop the foe. No, he will not leave off, I say, until he tears the city or the king limb from limb.

or in a version according to Herodotus:

Hear your fate, O dwellers in Sparta of the wide spaces;

Either your famed, great town must be sacked by Perseus' sons,
Or, if that be not, the whole land of Lacedaemon
Shall mourn the death of a king of the house of Heracles,
For not the strength of lions or of bulls shall hold him,
Strength against strength; for he has the power of Zeus,

And will not be checked until one of these two he has consumed.

The Spartans withdrew in consternation, wondering which fate was worse. The Delphians themselves then asked how Persia could be defeated. The oracle replied:

Pray to the Winds. They will prove to be mighty allies of Greece.

Events overtook the prophecy when the Persian army assaulted Thermopylae, where a Spartan-led coalition (popularly called the "300" after the number of Spartans sent (who were, excepting one man with an eye infection, killed to a man)) and allies held the pass against them. The Spartans under King Leonidas (The Lion) resisted the Persian advance at Thermopylae until betrayed. Refusing to retreat, the entire Spartan contingent, including their King (as foretold), lost their lives, but in so doing gained immortal fame. The Persian armada then sailed to nearby Cape Artemisium, where they were met by the Athenian fleet. The Athenian ships fought against great odds, but in three battles managed to hold their own.

A tremendous storm then arose at Artemesium, with the most violent winds attacking the ships for three days. The Persians lost about 20% of their warships and perhaps the same number of transport vessels to the storm. The stormy winds and huge waves did not harm the Athenian ships.

Back in Athens Themistocles argued that the wall of wood referred to the Athenian navy and persuaded the Athenians to pursue their policy of using wealth from their Attic silver mines at Laurium to continue building their fleet. On the grounds that the oracle referred to the nearby island of Salamis as "holy", he claimed that those slain would be Greece's enemies, not the Athenians. For these the oracle would have said "O cruel Salamis". His voice carried the day, Athens was evacuated to Salamis and in a following naval battle the Athenian fleet and its allies destroyed the Persian fleet at Salamis, while watched by Xerxes. Despite the fact that Athens was burned by the Persians, her occupants were saved, the Persian threat was ended and the authority of the Oracle was never higher.

=== 440 BC ===
Circa 440 BC the Oracle is also said to have claimed that there was no one wiser than Socrates, to which Socrates replied that either all were equally ignorant, or that he was wiser in that he alone was aware of his own ignorance ("what I do not know I do not think I know"). This claim is related to the first of the Delphic maxims inscribed on the forecourt of the Temple of Apollo at Delphi, Gnothi Seauton (γνῶθι σεαυτόν), "know yourself!". The second maxim is Meden agan (μηδὲν ἄγαν): "nothing in excess". Socrates was perhaps only about 30 years old at the time; his fame as a philosopher was yet to come.

One version of the claim stated that a friend of Socrates, Chaerephon, went before Pythia asking, "Is there any man alive wiser than Socrates?" The answer that he received was simply, "None." Another version is:

Sophocles is wise, Euripides is wiser, but of all men Socrates is wisest.

=== 431 BC ===
At the outbreak of the Peloponnesian War the Spartans sent a delegation to Delphi to inquire whether it would be wise to go to war against Athens. According to Thucydides, "It is said that the god replied that if they fought with all their might, victory would be theirs, and that he himself would be on their side, whether they invoked him or not."

=== 403 BC ===
In 403 BC, Lysander, the Spartan victor of the Peloponnesian War was warned to beware:

Also the dragon (serpent), earthborn, in craftiness coming behind thee.

He was slain from behind in 395 BC by Neachorus, who had a serpent painted upon his shield.

=== 401 BC ===
In 401 BC, Sparta was warned:

Sure though thy feet, proud Sparta, have a care,

A lame king's reign may see thee trip – Beware!
Troubles unlooked for long shall vex thy shore,

And rolling Time his tide of carnage pour.

Agesilaus, the lame king of Sparta, who acceded to the Spartan throne at the time of Lysander, through attacking enemies in every quarter, lost control of the seas to the Persians, who attacked Spartan coastal locations. In his obsession with Thebes, he incited the Thebans under Epaminondas to fight back. The Spartans were defeated for the first time by the Thebans in the battle of Leuctra in 371 BC; this led to the invasion of Sparta itself and its defeat at the battle of Mantinea in 362 BC.

In roughly the same year, Xenophon, a student of Socrates, was encouraged to visit the Oracle for advice on whether to accompany 10,000 mercenary Greek soldiers on an expedition to overthrow the king of Persia. "So Xenophon went and asked Apollo to what one of the gods he should sacrifice and pray in order best and most successfully to perform the journey which he had in mind and, after meeting with good fortune, to return home in safety; and Apollo in his response told him to what gods he must sacrifice. When Xenophon came back from Delphi, he reported the oracle to Socrates; and upon hearing about it Socrates found fault with him because he did not first put the question whether it were better for him to go or stay, but decided for himself that he was to go and then asked the god as to the best way of going. "However," he added, "since you did put the question in that way, you must do all that the god directed."

=== 359 BC ===
In 359 BC, Philip II of Macedon consulted the Oracle and was told:

With silver spears you may conquer the world

The king then sought to control the silver mines in the neighbouring Thracian and Illyrian kingdom, and using them to bribe his way to early victories, playing one Greek state off against the others, and isolating his enemies by bribes to potential allies.

Philip also had a highly spirited black colt that no one could ride. The Oracle of Delphi stated whoever could ride this horse would conquer the world, but despite many attempts neither Philip nor any of his generals could mount the horse. His son Alexander, later to be called Alexander the Great, succeeded, as he realized that the horse was afraid of his own shadow. Philip gave the horse Bucephalus to Alexander, who took the steed on his conquest of Asia.

In 353 BC, a third Sacred War broke out when Thebes had placed a fine upon Phocis, and Phocis heavily taxed the people of nearby Delphi and seized the Treasury of Delphi to pay for the war. The Amphictyonic League led by Philip declared war against Phocis. Philip sought to unite all Greece with Macedon in the Amphictyonic League to attack Persia.

In 339 BC, Philip interfered once again against the Amphictyonic alliance when the Krissans trespassed on Apollo's sacred grounds. Philip punished the Krissans, and consequently in 338 BC defeated the combined armies of the Athenians and the Spartans, thus becoming the dominant force in Greek affairs. Eventually, at the Battle of Chaeronea, he was successful against the Athenians and Thebans, but he was assassinated before he could lead the invasion of Persia.

=== 336 BC ===
Alexander the Great visited the Delphic Oracle wishing to hear a prophecy that he would soon conquer the entire ancient world. To his surprise the oracle refused a direct comment and asked him to come later. Furious, Alexander dragged Pythia by the hair out of the chamber until she screamed "You are invincible, my son!" (ἀνίκητος εἶ ὦ παῖ.). The moment he heard these words he dropped her, saying, "Now I have my answer". Modern historians however, have found it unlikely that this meeting ever took place.

=== about 300 BC ===
Diogenes Laërtius recorded that when Zeno of Citium "consulted the oracle, as to what he ought to do to live in the most excellent manner, the God answered him that he ought to become of the same complexion as the dead, on which he inferred that he ought to apply himself to the reading of the books of the ancients. Accordingly, he attached himself to Crates of Thebes...."

=== 279 BC ===
In 279 BC, plundered by a Celtic invasion, the oracle declared:

Care for these things fall on me!

The Celts were met by earthquakes, avalanches, and a massive snow storm, forcing them to retreat. But the Romans were a different matter. In 191 BC, the sanctuary of Delphi fell into the Roman sphere of influence, and the oracle generally supported the rise of Rome henceforth.

== Roman Period ==
=== 79 BC ===
In 83 BC, Delphi was razed by an attack from the Thracian tribe of Maedi who extinguished the sacred fire which had been burning uninterrupted for centuries. In 79 BC Cicero consulted the Oracle as to how he should find greatest fame and was told:

Make your own nature, not the advice of others, your guide in life.

Cicero cultivated his oratory and his skills in the courts in preserving Rome from the Catilinarian conspiracy, earning undying fame.

=== 67 AD ===
In 67 AD, Emperor Nero was told to beware the 73rd year and assumed this meant that he would die at that age. Instead, he was overthrown in 69 AD by Galba, who was then 73 years old.

=== Before 117 AD ===
Before 117 AD the Emperor Hadrian visited Delphi before he reached the throne. After drinking from the Castalian Spring, his destiny as Emperor was proclaimed. When he had acceded to the throne, he ordered it blocked up so no one else could get the same idea in the same way.

=== 302 AD ===
The Emperor Diocletian on consulting the oracle on the advice of Galerius was told that the sect of Christianity would lead to the destruction of the Empire. This led to the Diocletianic Persecution where Christians were persecuted for not agreeing to the sacrifices to the Greek and Roman gods. After the Edict of Toleration by Constantine and especially after the reign of Theodosius, Christians retaliated by persecuting the Pythia.

=== 362 AD ===
Hagiography has it that in 362, Oribasius visited the Delphic oracle, now in a rather desolate state, on behalf of his emperor Julian the Apostate, offering Julian's services to the temple and, in return, receiving one of the last prophecies by the Delphic Pythia:

Tell the emperor that my hall has fallen to the ground. Phoibos no longer has his house, nor his mantic bay, nor his prophetic spring; the water has dried up.

Fontenrose doubts the authenticity of this oracle, characterizing it a "Christian oracle, devised to show that the Delphic Apollo foresaw the mission of Christ and the end of Oracles."

== See also ==
- Barnum effect
- Delphic maxims
