= Cirrha =

Ancient Greek town in Phocis

Coordinates: 38°25′47″N 22°26′44″E

Cirrha or Kirra (Ancient Greek: Κίρρα) was a town in ancient Phocis on the coast, which served as the harbour of Delphi. Pausanias erroneously supposes that Cirrha was a later name of the Homeric Crissa. They were two separate towns, albeit with interlinked histories.

Crissa was more ancient than Cirrha, and was situated inland a little southwest of Delphi, at the southern end of a projecting spur of Mount Parnassus. Crissa gave name to the Crissaean Gulf, and its ruins may still be seen at a short distance from the modern village of Chrisso. Cirrha was built subsequently at the head of the gulf, and rose into a town from being the port of Crissa. This is in accordance with what we find in the history of other Grecian states. The original town is built upon a height at some distance from the sea, to secure it against hostile attacks, especially by sea; but in course of time, when property has become more secure, and the town itself has grown in power, a second place springs up on that part of the coast which had served previously as the port of the inland town. This was undoubtedly the origin of Cirrha, which was situated at the mouth of the river Pleistus, and at the foot of Mount Cirphis.

In course of time the sea-port town of Cirrha increased at the expense of Crissa; and the sanctuary of Pytho grew into the town of Delphi, which claimed to be independent of Crissa. Thus Crissa declined, as Cirrha and Delphi rose in importance. The power of Cirrha excited the jealousy of the Delphians, more especially as the inhabitants of the former city commanded the approach to the temple by sea. Moreover, the Cirrhaeans levied exorbitant tolls upon the pilgrims who landed at the town upon their way to Delphi, and were said to have maltreated Phocian women on their return from the temple. In consequence of these outrages, the Amphictyons declared war, the First Sacred War, against the Cirrhaeans about 595 BCE, and at the end of ten years besieged (see Siege of Cirrha) and succeeded in taking the city, which was razed to the ground, and the plain in its neighbourhood dedicated to Apollo, and curses imprecated upon any one who should till or dwell in it. Cirrha is said to have been taken by a stratagem which is ascribed by some to Solon. The town was supplied with water by a canal from the river Pleistus. This canal was turned off, filled with hellebore, and then allowed to resume its former course; but scarcely had the thirsty Crissaeans drank of the poisoned water, than they were so weakened by its purgative effects that they could no longer defend their walls. This account sounds like a romance; but it is a curious circumstance that near the ruins of Cirrha there is a salt spring having a purgative effect like the hellebore of the ancients.

Cirrha was thus destroyed; but the fate of Crissa is uncertain. It is not improbable that Crissa had sunk into insignificance before this war, and that some of its inhabitants had settled at Delphi, and others at Cirrha. At all events, it is certain that Cirrha was the town against which the vengeance of the Amphictyons was directed. The spoils of Cirrha were employed by the Amphictyons in founding the Pythian Games. Near the ruins of the town in the Cirrhaean plain was the Hippodrome, and in the time of Pindar the Stadium also. The Hippodrome always remained in the maritime plain; but at a later time the Stadium was removed to Delphi. Cirrha remained in ruins, and the Cirrhaean plain continued uncultivated down to the time of Philip II of Macedon, the father of Alexander the Great, when the Amphissians dared to cultivate again the sacred plain, and attempted to rebuild the ruined town. This led to the Third Sacred War, in which Amphissa was taken by Philip, to whom the Amphictyons had entrusted the conduct of the war, in 338 BCE.

Cirrha, however, was afterwards rebuilt as the port of Delphi. It is first mentioned again by Polybius; and in the time of Pausanias (2nd century) it contained a temple common to Apollo, Artemis, and Leto, in which were statues of Attic work.

Between Crissa and Cirrha was a fertile plain, bounded on the north by Parnassus, on the east by Cirphis, and on the west by the mountains of the Ozolian Locrians. On the western side it extended as far north as Amphissa, which was situated at the head of that part of the plain. This plain, as lying between Crissa and Cirrha, might be called either the Crissaean or Cirrhaean, and is sometimes so designated by the ancient writers; but, properly speaking, there appears to have been a distinction between the two plains. The Cirrhaean plain was the small plain near the town of Cirrha, extending from the sea as far as the modern village of Xeropegado, where it is divided by two projecting rocks from the larger and more fertile Crissaean plain, which stretches as far as Crissa and Amphissa. The small Cirrhaean plain on the coast was the one dedicated to Apollo after the destruction of Cirrha. The name of the Crissaean plain in its more extended sense might include the Cirrhaean, so that the latter may be regarded as a part of the former. The boundaries of the land dedicated to the god were inscribed on one of the walls of the Delphian temple.

The site of ancient Cirrha is identified at a hill called Magoula Xeropigadas near the modern village of Kirra, which reflects the ancient name, within the bounds of the municipal unit of Itea. As of the mid-19th century, the remains of walls, enclosing a quadrangular space about a mile (1.6 km) in circuit, could be traced; and both within and without this space are the foundations of many large and small buildings.
