= Kirra, Phocis =

Village in Central Greece

Kirra Κίρρα
- Community
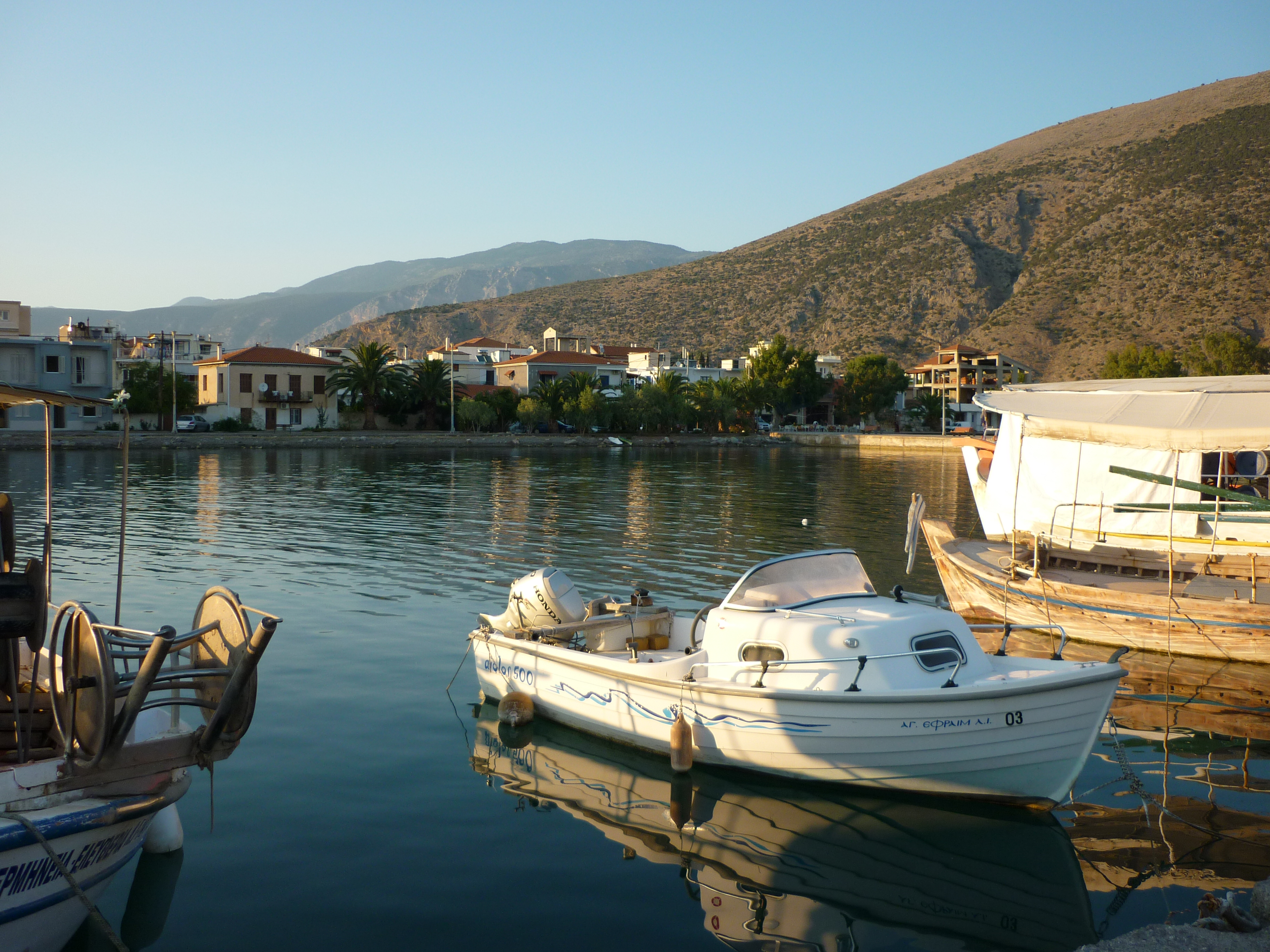
- Port of Kirra, from the outer breakwater

- Location within Greece
- Coordinates: 38.4325°N 22.4505°E
- Country: Greece
- Administrative region: Central Greece
- Regional unit: Phocis
- Municipality: Delphi
- Municipal unit: Itea

Population (2021)
  - Community: 1,392
- Time zone: UTC+2 (EET)
  - Summer (DST): UTC+3 (EEST)

Kirra (Greek: Κίρρα, Latin: Cirrha) is a village in Phocis, Central Greece. It is part of the municipal unit of Itea, to which it is adjacent. Kirra is the point where the Pleistos river meets the Gulf of Iteas, a bay of the Gulf of Corinth.

== Ancient history ==
In ancient times Cirrha existed as a fortified city that controlled access to Delphi from the Corinthian Gulf. This strategic location of Kirra allowed its citizens to rob pilgrims on their way to the Delphic Oracle. This behavior prompted many of the other tribal entities of the adjacent regions to form the Amphictionic League, an alliance for the protection of the cult of Demeter in Anthele (initially) and of Apollo in Delphi. The Amphictyony consulted the oracle for advice on dealing with Kirra, and the reply was a call for war. Tradition goes that they added a curse in the name of Apollo: that the soil should bring forth no crops, that the children of the women and livestock should be deformed, and that the entire ethnic group that inhabited the city should be eradicated. The ensuing war lasted for ten years (595 BC-585 BC) and became known as the First Sacred War.

A leading figure of the attack was the tyrant Cleisthenes of Sicyon, who used his powerful navy to blockade the city's port before using an allied Amphictionic army to besiege Kirra. What transpired after this is a matter of debate. The earliest, and therefore probably most reliable, account is that of the medical writer Thessalos, who in the 5th century BC wrote that the attackers discovered a secret water pipe leading into the city after it was broken by a horse's hoof. An asclepiad named Nebros, or, according to another version the Athenian Solon advised the allies to poison the water with hellebore. The hellebore soon rendered the defenders so weak with diarrhea that they were unable to continue resisting the assault. Kirra was captured and the entire population was slaughtered. Nebros was an ancestor of Hippocrates of Kos, so this story has caused many to wonder whether it might not have been guilt over his ancestor's use of poison that drove Hippocrates to establish the Hippocratic Oath.

Later historians told different stories. According to Frontinus (Strat. III.7.6) who wrote in the 1st century AD, after discovering the pipe, the Amphictions cut it, leading to great thirst within the city. After a while, they restored the pipe, allowing water to flow into the city. The desperate Kirreans immediately began drinking the water, unaware that Kleisthenes and his allies had poisoned it with hellebore. According to Polyaenus, a writer of the 2nd century AD, after the pipe was discovered, the attackers added the hellebore to the spring from which the water came, without ever actually depriving the Kirreans of water. Polyaenus also gave credit for the strategy not to Kleisthenes but to general Eurylochos, who allegedly advised his allies to gather a large amount of hellebore from Anticyra, where it was abundant. The stories of Frontinus and Polyaenus both have the same result as Thessalos's tale: the defeat of Kirra.

The last major historian to advance a new story of the siege was Pausanias, who visited the region in the 2nd century AD. In his version of events Solon of Athens diverted the course of the River Pleistos so that it didn't run through Kirra. Solon had hoped to thus defeat the Kirreans by thirst, but the enemy were able to get enough water from their wells and rainwater collection. Solon then added a great quantity of hellebore to the water of the Pleistos and let it flow into Kirra. The poisoning then allowed the allies to destroy the city.

== Archaeological remains ==
Archaeological excavations proved that the first settlement in Kirra dates to the 3rd millennium B.C. and was located close to the present-day church of the Dormition of Mary. The settlement, inaugurated in the Early Helladic Period, thrived throughout the Middle Helladic period and in the early Mycenaean era. Archaeological sections throughout the modern settlement revealed houses, streets and several tombs as well as a pottery kiln. In the historic era, Kirra was referred to in the ancient authors as port of Delphi. Port infrastructure, part of which is still visible, protected the city from the sea, whereas a sturdy wall, with rectangular towers, built probably in the mid-4th century B.C. protected the settlement from inland attacks. The shipyards, the best preserved monument, were built in the 5th century B.C. They consisted of at least five rectangular and long compartments, in which small ships and boats could be dragged from the sea for repairs. At the back of the complex lay two rooms, probably used by the travelers as storage space or for their own rest. An important sanctuary, dedicated to Apollo, Artemis and Leto was also extant in Kirra. Next to the modern Church of the Dormition of Mary a rectangular area was discovered, measuring 160 x 130 meters and surrounded by porticoes giving to the interior open-air rectangle, where the temple building was erected. A number of clay figurines were discovered here and displayed nowadays in the Archaeological Museum of Amphissa.

== Modern Kirra ==
Kirra is part of the regional unit of Phocis. It is known for its beaches, camping and water sports. Excavations in the region have revealed traces of habitation since the Early Helladic period with a prosperity period in the Middle Helladic period. A sanctuary, possibly dedicated to Poseidon, has been excavated close to the beach of the modern town. The Medieval tower on the seaside as well as some traces of port infrastructure attest to the prosperity of Kirra in the Byzantine and Frankish period.

== Name ==
- Cirrha (Kirra) was a nymph from whom the town of Cirrha in Phocis was believed to have derived its name.
- Kirra is another name for the nymph Adrasteia. At Cirrha, the port that served Delphi, Pausanias noted "a temple of Apollo, Artemis and Leto, with very large images of Attica workmanship. Adrasteia has been set up by the Cirrhaeans in the same place, but she is not so large as the other images. She was sometimes called Nemesis (mythology), probably meaning "one from whom there is no escape"; her epithet Erinys ("implacable") is specially applied to Demeter and the Phrygian mother goddess, Cybele.

== Cultural references ==
- On the popular TV series Xena: Warrior Princess, the character Callisto was born in this city (named Cirra in the show) and Xena's army burned it when Callisto was a small girl, killing her family. This sparked Callisto's hatred of Xena, and she grew up to become one of Xena's worst enemies.
- The village of Kirra is featured in the 2013 PlayStation 3 game, God of War: Ascension.
- Kirrha also appears in the game Assassin's Creed: Odyssey where the player docks their ship on their way to visit the Oracle Of Delphi.

== Sources ==
- Pausanias, Description of Greece, 10.37.8.
