= Crissa =

Ancient city in Phocis, Greece

Coordinates: 38°28′16″N 22°28′08″E

Crissa or Krissa (Ancient Greek: Κρίσσα) or Crisa or Krisa (Κρῖσα) was a town in ancient Phocis. Crissa was regarded as one of the most ancient cities in Greece. It was situated inland a little southwest of Delphi, at the southern end of a projecting spur of Mount Parnassus. It is mentioned in the Catalogue of Ships in the Iliad as the "divine Crissa" (Κρῖσα ζαθέη). According to the Homeric Hymn to Apollo, it was founded by a colony of Cretans, who were led to the spot by Apollo himself, and whom the god had chosen to be his priests in the sanctuary which he had intended to establish at Pytho. In this hymn, Crissa is described as situated under Parnassus, where no chariots rolled, and no trampling of horses was heard, a description suitable to the site of Crissa upon the rocks. In like manner, Nonnus, following the description of the ancient epic poets, speaks of Crissa as surrounded by rocks. Moreover, the statement of Pindar, that the road to Delphi from the Hippodrome on the coast led over the Crissaean hill, leaves no doubt of the true position of Crissa, since the road from the plain to Delphi must pass by the projecting spur of Parnassus on which the modern village of Chrisso stands. In the Homeric hymn to Apollo, Crissa appears as a powerful place, possessing as its territory the rich plain stretching down to the sea, and also the adjoining sanctuary of Pytho itself, which had not yet become a separate town. In fact, Crissa is in this hymn identified with Delphi. Even in Pindar, the name of Crissa is used as synonymous with Delphi, just as Pisa occurs in the poets as equivalent to Olympia. Metapontium in Magna Graecia (modern Italy) is said to have been a colony of Crissa.

Near Crissa, but established later, was a seaport named Cirrha. In the course of time the seaport town of Cirrha increased at the expense of Crissa; and the sanctuary of Pytho grew into the town of Delphi, which claimed to be independent of Crissa. Thus Crissa declined, as Cirrha and Delphi rose in importance. Cirrha was destroyed in the First Sacred War; but the fate of Crissa is uncertain. It is not improbable that Crissa had sunk into insignificance before this war, and that some of its inhabitants had settled at Delphi, and others at Cirrha.

Between Crissa and Cirrha was a fertile plain, bounded on the north by Parnassus, on the east by Mount Cirphis, and on the west by the mountains of the Ozolian Locrians. On the western side it extended as far north as Amphissa, which was situated at the head of that part of the plain. This plain, as lying between Crissa and Cirrha, might be called either the Crissaean or Cirrhaean, and is sometimes so designated by the ancient writers; but, properly speaking, there appears to have been a distinction between the two plains. The Cirrhaean plain was the small plain near the town of Cirrha, extending from the sea as far as the modern village of Xeropegado, where it is divided by two projecting rocks from the larger and more fertile Crissaean plain, which stretches as far as Crissa and Amphissa. The small Cirrhaean plain on the coast was the one dedicated to Apollo after the destruction of Cirrha. The name of the Crissaean plain in its more extended sense might include the Cirrhaean, so that the latter may be regarded as a part of the former. The boundaries of the land dedicated to the god were inscribed on one of the walls of the Delphian temple.

The ancient town of Crissa gave its name to the bay above which it stood; and the name was extended from this bay to the whole of the Corinthian Gulf, which was called Crissaean in the most ancient times. Cirrha was built subsequently at the head of the bay, and rose into a town from being the port of Crissa. This is in accordance with what we find in the history of other Grecian states. The original town is built upon a height at some distance from the sea, to secure it against hostile attacks, especially by sea; but in the course of time, when the property has become more secure, and the town itself has grown in power, a second place springs up on that part of the coast which had served previously as the port of the inland town. This was undoubtedly the origin of Cirrha, which was situated at the mouth of the river Pleistus, and at the foot of Mount Cirphis.

As of the mid-19th century, ancient Crissa's ruins could still be seen at a short distance from the modern village of Chrisso, surrounding the church of the Forty Saints. They consist of very ancient polygonal walls, still as high as 10 feet (3.0 m) in some parts, and as broad as 18 feet (5.5 m) on the northern side, and 12 feet (3.7 m) on the western.
