= Delia (festival) =

Ancient religious festival to Apollo on Delos

The Delia (Ancient Greek: Δήλια) were festivals and games celebrated in classical antiquity at the great celebratory gathering (panegyris) on the island of Delos.

== History ==
This gathering was apparently originally related to the meetings of the Delian League, a religious alliance (amphictyony) to which the Cyclades and the neighboring Ionians on the coasts belonged. This amphictyony seems originally to have been instituted simply for the purpose of religious worship in the common sanctuary of Apollo Delios, the patron god (θεὸς πατρῳος, theos patroos) of the Ionians, who was believed to have been born at Delos. The Delia, as appears from the Homeric Hymn to Apollo (147), had existed from very early times, and were celebrated every fourth year, possibly in the Athenian month of Hieros, or in Thargelion, to apply to Delos the Athenian calendar. The members of the amphictyony assembled on these occasions (ὲθεώρουν) in Delos, in long garments, with their wives and children, to worship the god with gymnastic and musical contests, choruses, and dances. That the Athenians took part in these solemnities at a very early period, is evident from the Deliastoi (afterwards called Theoroi, Θεωροί) mentioned in the laws of Solon; the sacred vessel (θεωρίς), moreover, which they sent to Delos every year, was said to be the same which Theseus had sent after his return from Crete. The Delians, during the celebration of these solemnities, performed the office of cooks for those who visited their island, whence they were called Έλεοδύται.

In the course of time, the celebration of this ancient panegyris in Delos ceased, and it was not revived until the sixth year of the Peloponnesian War, in Olympiad 88 year 3 (426 BC), after the Athenians had expiated the Island of Delos, removing all the contents of their graves there to Rheneia, and ordaining that henceforth nobody should either be born or die on the island. The Athenians restored the ancient solemnities, and added horse-races, which had never before taken place at the Delia. After this restoration, Athens being at the head of the Ionian confederacy took the most prominent part in the celebration of the Delia; and though the islanders, in common with Athens, provided the choruses and victims, the leader (ὰρχιθέωρος), who conducted the whole solemnity, was an Athenian (Plutarch Nic. 3; Wolf. Introd. ad Demosth. Lept. p. xc.), and the Athenians had the superintendence of the common sanctuary (see Amphictyons).

== The Lesser Delia ==
From these solemnities, belonging to the great Delian panegyris, must be distinguished the Lesser Delia, called by the Delians Apollonia, which were celebrated every year, probably on the 6th of Thargelion. The Athenians on this occasion sent the sacred vessel (θεωρίς), which the priest of Apollo adorned with laurel branches, to Delos. The embassy was called θεωρία, and those who sailed to the island, θεωροί; and before they set sail, a solemn sacrifice was offered in the Delion, at Marathon, in order to obtain a happy voyage. (Karl Otfried Müller Dor. ii. 2. § 14.) During the absence of the vessel, which on one occasion lasted thirty days, the city of Athens was purified, and no criminal was allowed to be executed. The lesser Delia were said to have been instituted by Theseus after slaying the Minotaur, though in some legends they are mentioned at a much earlier period, and Plutarch (Life of Theseus 23) relates that the ancient ship used by the founder himself, though often repaired, was preserved and used by the Athenians down to the time of Demetrius Phalereus.
