= Temple of Demeter Amphictyonis =

Ancient Greek cultic site

The Temple of Demeter Amphictyonis was an extra-urban sanctuary in ancient Anthele in Thermopylae, dedicated to Demeter. It was an important Panhellenic shrine of Demeter and one of her main cult centers in Greece. It was also known as a center of the Amphictyonic League.

The sanctuary is mentioned by Herodotus in the 5th century BC:

Between the river [Phoinix, a tributary of the Asopos River] and Thermopylai there is a village named Anthele, past which the Asopos flows out into the sea, and there is a wide space around it in which stand a temple of Demeter Amphiktyonis, seats for the Amphiktyones, and a temple of Amphiktyon himself.

Excavations has dated the structures to the 5th-century BC. The archeological remains include a trapezoidal peribolos, identified as a large stoa and stadium, which measures north side 66.30m, south side 65.30m, east side 6.20m, west side 7.65m. The Sanctuary of Demeter Amphyctionis was known in antiquity as the place where the Pylaian or Delphic Amphictyonic council met each autumn.

Demeter Amphictyonis is depicted on a coin minted by Philip II of Macedon, who took over control of the Amphictyonic League in 339 BC. The coin from 335 BC portrayed the profile of Demeter wearing a veil and a wreath of grain on the obverse, and seated Apollo on the reverse, inscribed not by the Delphian name but with 'AMΦΙΚΤΥΩΝΩΝ' ("Of the Amphictyons").

The sanctuary still existed in the age of Strabo, who described it:

There is also a large harbor here [at Thermopylai], and a temple of Demeter, in which at the time of every Pylaian assembly the Amphiktyons performed sacrificial rites. [...] The first cities which came together [to form the Amphictyonic League to care for the shared shrines of Ancient Greece] are said to have been twelve, and each sent a Pylagoras, the assembly convening twice a year, in spring and in late autumn; but later still more cities were added. They called the assembly Pylaia, both that of spring and that of late autumn, since they convened at Pylai, which is also called Thermopylai; and the Pylagorai sacrificed to Demeter.

If still in use by the 4th century AD, the temple would have been closed during the persecution of pagans under the Christian Emperors, when edicts where issued prohibiting all non-Christian worship. Excavations has been made of the archeological remains.

== See also ==
- List of Ancient Greek temples
- Architecture of Ancient Greece

== Sources ==
- Leekley, D. and N. Efstratiou, 1980. Archaeolog: ical Excavatigns in Central And Northern Greece 127. Park Ridge (New Jersey): Noyes Press.
- Susan-Marie Cronkite, The Sanctuary of Demeter at Mytilene: A Diachronic and Contextual Study. Volume Two Catalogue, 1997, Institute of Archaeology, University College London
