= Phoenix (river) =

River in Greece

The Phoenix River (Ancient Greek: Φοῖνιξ; also Phoinix) is a river in Greece.

== Geographical context ==
The Phoenix River is located in south-eastern Thessaly, and within the Malis region specifically south of Trachis which is at the base of Mount Oeta. The Phoenix originates in the Trachinian cliffs and flows into the Asopus near to Thermopylae. From the Phoenix to Thermopylae was determined by Herodotus to be fifteen furlongs distance. (Note: 1 furlong is about 201 meters, which makes the distance about 3.0 kilometers) In this land there was a village named Anthela.

== Historical significance ==
The Phoenix River is described by Herodotus in reference to Xerxes (βασιλεὺς Ξέρξης: King Xerxes) who had invaded mainland Greece during 480 BC. Xerxes fought the Battle of Thermopylae commencing in August of 480.

In the account of the landing of Xerxes in Greece Herodotus states before arriving in Malis Xerxes and his army were in Thessaly which is where C. Plinius Secundus locates a river named Phoenix in The Historie of the World.

== Cultural significance ==
Phoenix was son of Amyntor, basileus of Hellas, which before Thucydides was the name for the geographical region south of Thessaly. Strabo (in Geographica) states the river is named after Amyntor's son and that his tomb is near to it. (Note: According to Nostoi, attributed to Agias of Trozen and recounted by Proclus, Phoenix died near or in Thrace)

== See also ==
- Φοίνικας ποταμός in Achaia (Αχαΐα)
- Phoenix
