= Pleistos =

Pleistos Xeropotamos
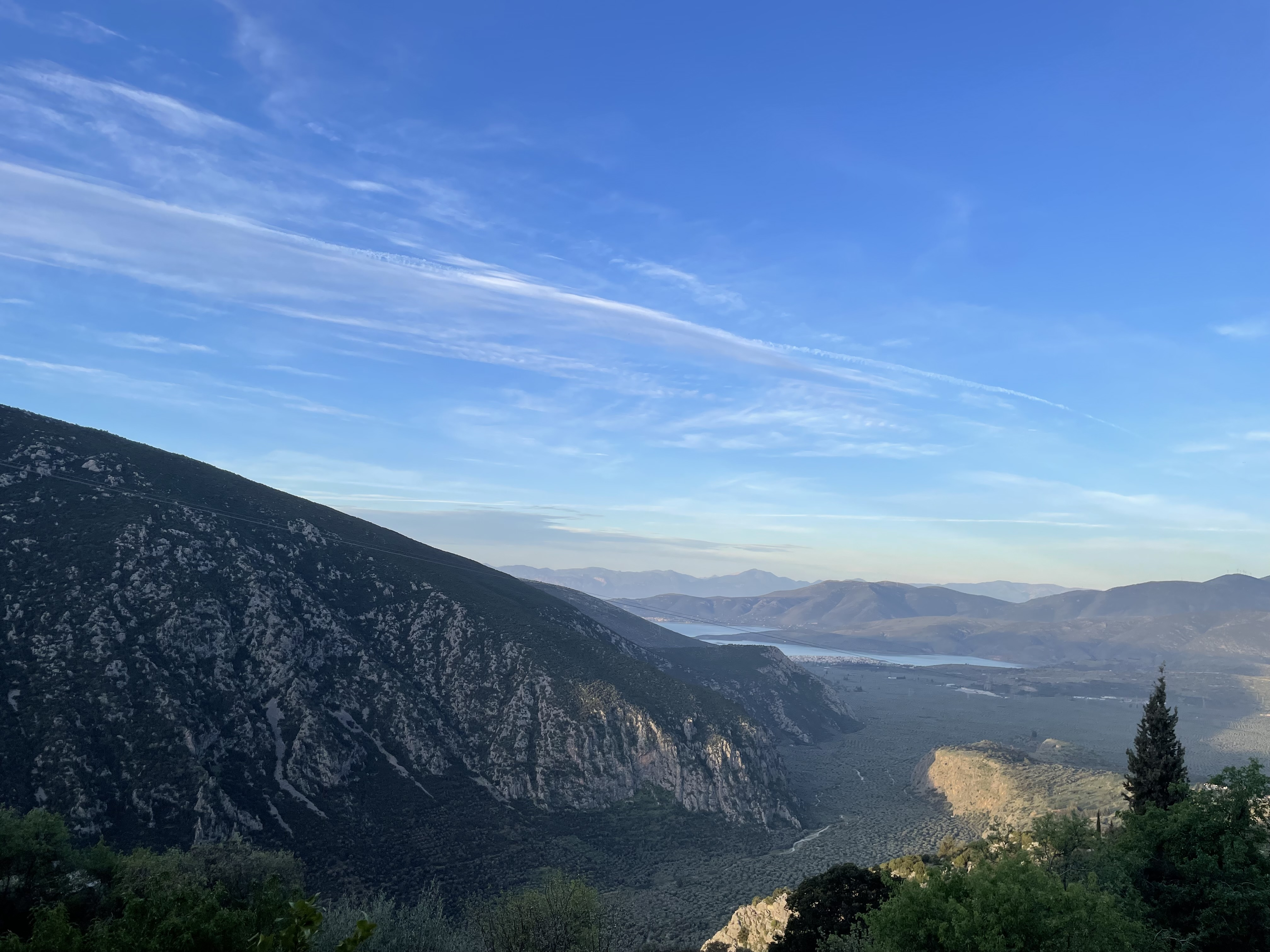
- Lower Pleistos river and valley from Delphi on the north slopes, with the Gulf of Itea in the background, and Mt. Cirphis in the foregound.
- Etymology: "full [river]" in an ironic sense, as it is mainly and usually empty on the surface, due to its underground channels. Xeropotamos, the local name, is "dry river."
- Native name: Πλείστος (Greek)

Location
- Country: Greece

Physical characteristics
- Source
  - location: Mount Parnassus
- Mouth
  - location: Gulf of Corinth at Kirra
  - coordinates: 38.4282°N 22.4535°E
- Length: approx. 16.4 km (10.2 mi)

Basin features
- Tributaries
  - right: Kouvassina or Couvassina

The Pleistos (Greek: Πλείστος, Ancient Greek: Πλεῖστος, Latin: Pleistus) is a river in central Greece. It drains the Pleistos valley, named after it, a relatively recent rift valley north of the Gulf of Corinth, and parallel to it. They have the same geologic causes. Being situated in karst topography, much of the river runs or seeps through underground channels. The surface stream is intermittent. However, the limestone riverbed reflecting the light gives the appearance of a stream of water.

The semi-arid valley floor, too inaccessible for urban development, is eminently suitable for dendriculture. Extensive olive groves, nicknamed the "sea of olives," have been in place since prehistoric times. The floor is flanked by precipitous elevations, notably a scarp on the north side. The primary access road to the valley runs on the side of the north scarp throughout its entire length.

Near the lower valley the road intersects the site of ancient Delphi. Oracular temples have existed there since Mycenaean times. The spring system at Delphi drops into the Pleistos. The lower valley was a seat of Mycenaean power, with capital at Krisa. The Gulf of Corinth was then named the Gulf of Krisa, but in early classical times the states of southern Greece combined to remove Krisa from its predominance in the region.

== Geography of the Pleistos and its valley ==
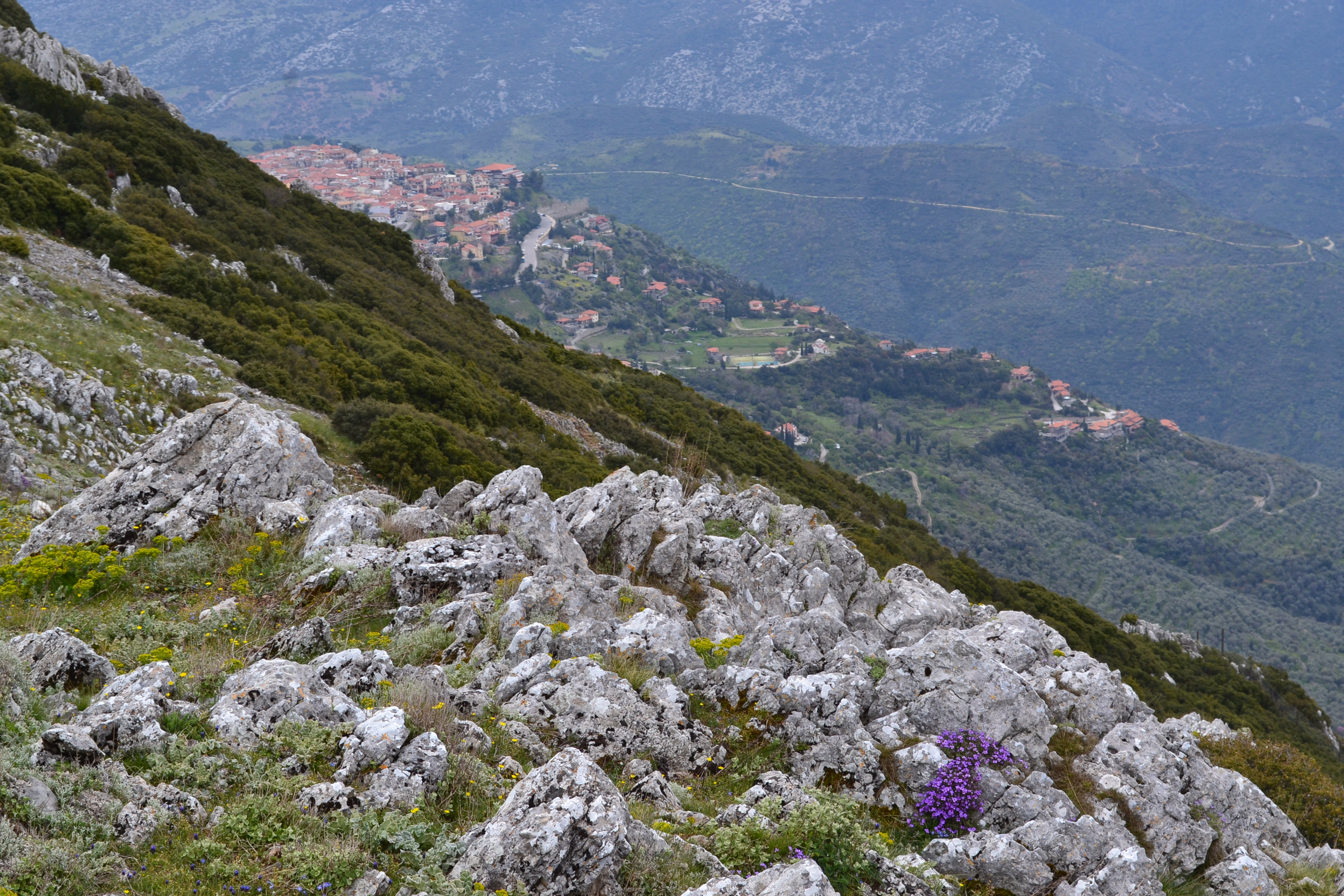
Arachova and the upper Pleistos valley, seen from the slopes of Parnassus.

The true sources of the water in the upper Pleistos are the numerous springs that exude from the base of the north scarp, and waterfalls that pour over it. The scarp is after all the flank of Parnassos. Some ground water must be seeping from it continually as though it were a sieve. This water in all the cracks breaks out rocks by freezing and thawing, while in the soil of the scree it contributes to the fluidity, making landslides more likely. Rockfalls and mudslides are common along the valley, making protection by steel mesh fences a necessity in places, and closing some features of Delphi to the public. Earthquakes, which render the soil momentarily into a fluid, are all the more devastating. Buildings destroyed by them are likely to fall down the scree into the Pleistos.

The river begins from sources on the side of Mount Parnassos below the town of Arachova, Boeotia, at approximately 38°28′34.8″N 22°35′26.8″E. The elevation is approximately 700 metres (2,300 ft).

The river flows west through a deep valley, between the mountains Parnassos and Kirphe, passing south of Delphi, through the Delphic Landscape and the Krisaean plain and reaches the Gulf of Itea, a bay of the Corinthian Gulf, near Kirra. The water of the Castalian Spring system flows into the Pleistos. The river enters the Gulf of Cornth undramatically through a culvert of the coastal road on the east side of Cirra. A stream a few inches deep leaves the culvert to cross a small delta, geologically of antique origin. This stream is alternately labelled the Pleistos or the Cirra River. On the other side of the road it comes from a wetland passing by St. John's Church. The wetland originates further north from a ravine in Mount Cirphis, but it does not receive any waters above ground from the flow of Pleistos.

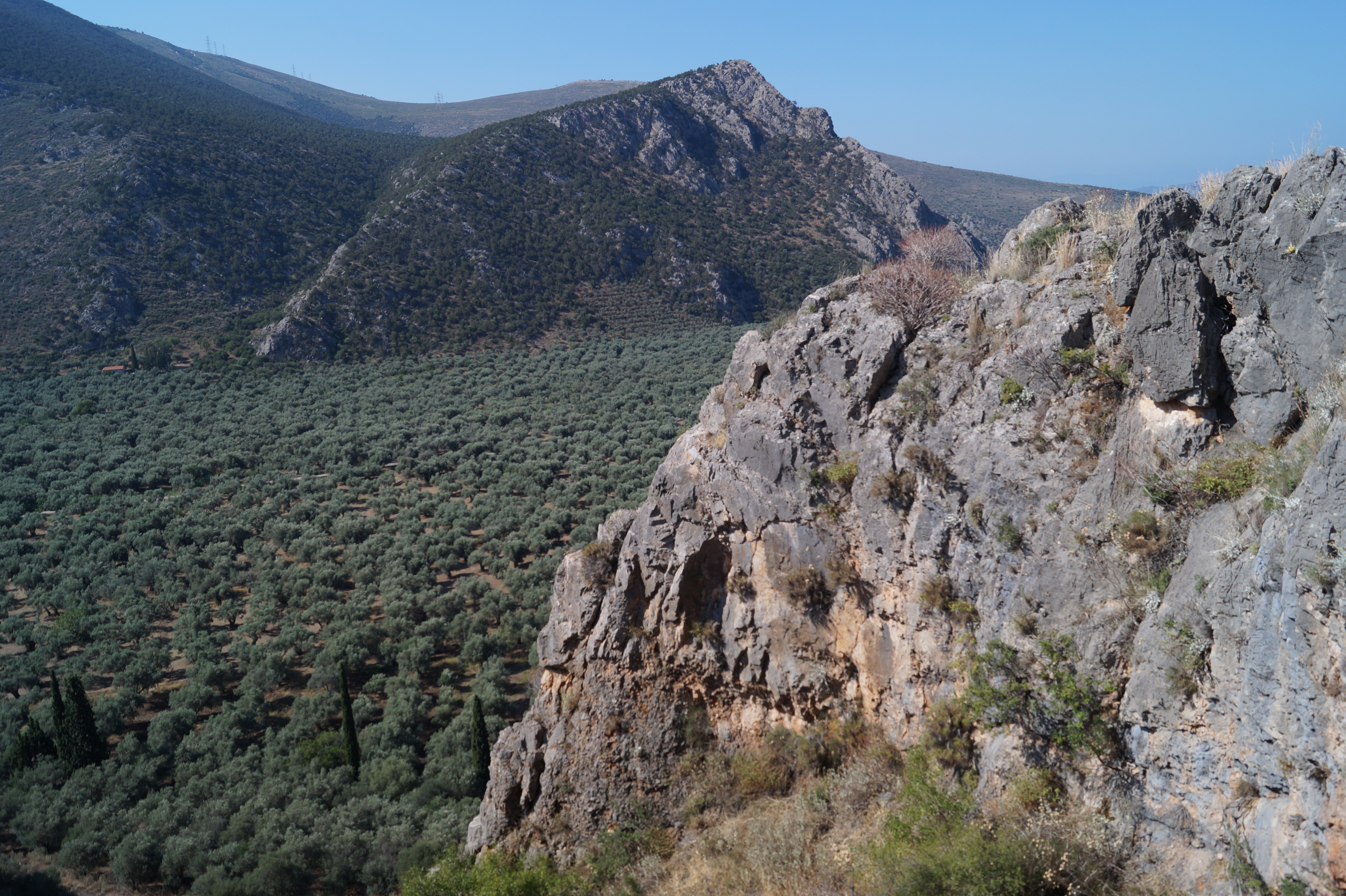
The "sea of olives" in the lower Pleistos valley.

A few yards to the west of the culvert is another culvert under the same road, but without a delta. Its water comes from an apparent ditch beside the Itea Peripheral Road. Northward this ditch leaves the road and becomes a controlled channel through the olive groves. Along it are private farmhouses and footbridges. The channel is continuous with the stream in the Pleistos Valley. The visible bed is usually empty. If Pleistos means "full" as some say it does, the use must be an irony.

Apparently the hydrologic channels were altered in the management of the groves. They cover the entire non-urban areas of the valley system and are called locally "the sea of olives." The stream with the braided delta must represent the more ancient stream, the original Pleistos. During the reconfiguration of the hydrology, the Pleistos was disconnected from its wetlands and forced to irrigate olive trees. The climate is semi-arid. The wetlands then became the Cirra. A similar nomenclature discrepancy exists on the west side of the valley. The Skitsa River erodes the Amfissa Valley and then courses in a straight, controlled channel to the gulf at Itea, irrigating the west side of the valley. The sources say that it also was formerly named the Plistos, implying that the same Plistos river drained both valleys before different channels were dredged.

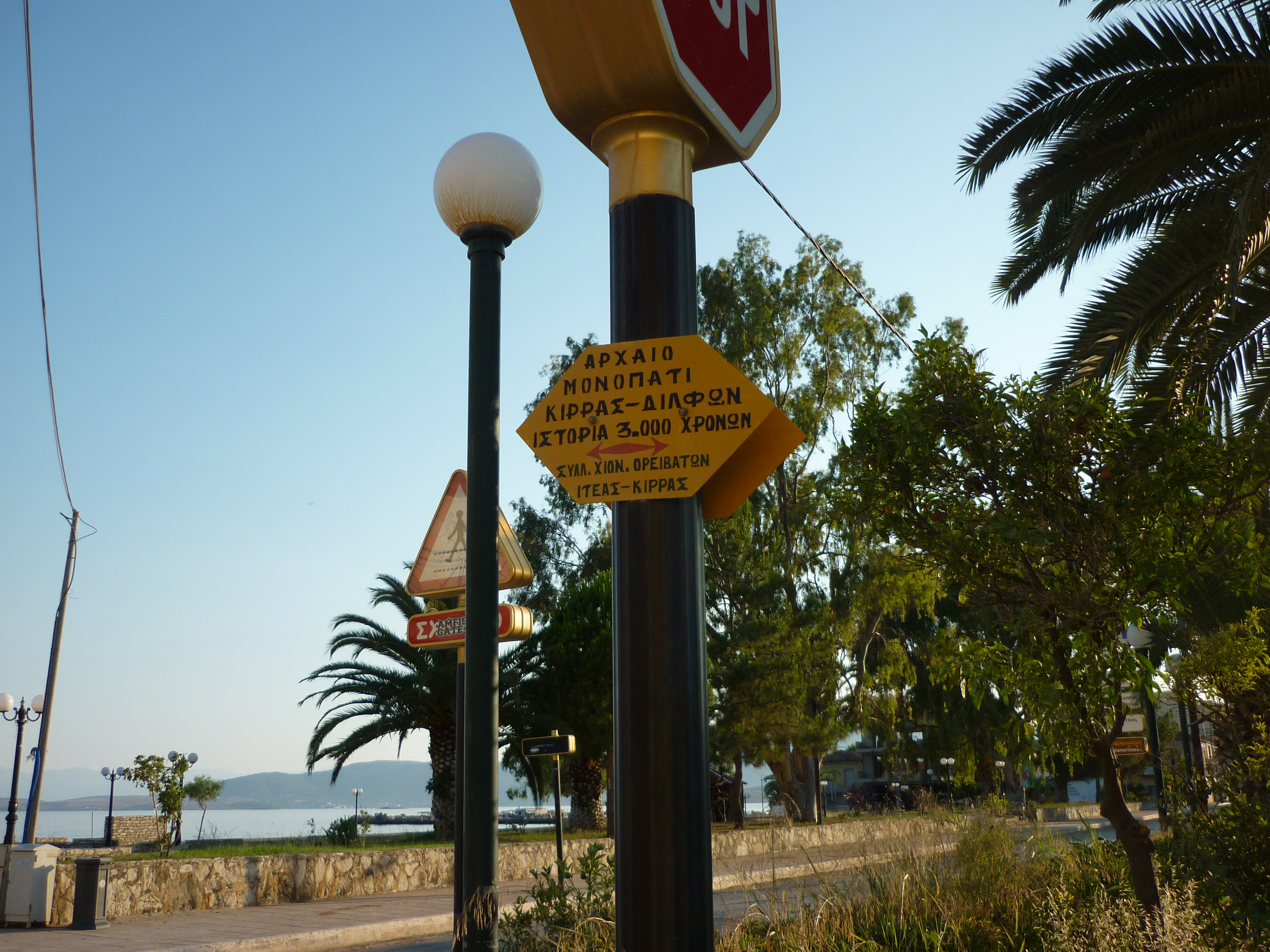
Start of the Delphi trail in Kirra on the Gulf of Itea

The Pleistos Ravine is at the bottom of a cross-gradient. The upper Pleistos follows the base of Mount Cirphis. There is a gradient across the valley, the high side being on the north. The low side is called by some "the Pleistos ravine." It is joined by a single stream resulting from the merger of the Delphi springs, but does not originate there. The sources are diffuse. The farthest east is a ravine that develops at the foot of the scarp and crosses under Route 48 just below the pass east of Arachova, a mountain city. The upper Pleistos and its valley are protected: no industrial artefacts are to be seen from Delphi (for example high voltage power lines and the like are routed so as to be invisible from the area of the sanctuary). The stream has been left in its original bed, visible as tracks of bare limestone. A hiking trail on the footprint of the original access road begins on the docks at Cirra, proceeds straight up the valley to the upper Pleistos, follows it to the springs, and ascends their stream to the Castalian Spring. The hike takes 3–4 hours. Most visitors take the bus along Route 48. The road at the spring includes a bus park.

== Geology of the Pleistos valley system ==
The Pleistos Valley is an outcome of two main standard movements of the crust: the orogeny of Parnassus and the other mountains of Greece, termed the Hellenides, and back-arc extension, a southward-directed movement of the Peloponnesus and Aegean islands.

=== Hellenic orogeny ===
Orogeny today is considered the result of plate collision. In the theory of continental drift, the surface of the Earth is divided by mid-ocean ridges and oceanic trenches into plates, or "tectonic plates," (Note: "Tectonic" is a term referring to roofs in architecture) which "drift" over the Earth and collide, as though the dense base rock were an ocean and the lighter plates with continents upon them were adrift.

The idea of rock drifting over rock impeded the acceptance of continental drift, proposed by Alfred Wegener in 1912, until the data gathered in the International Geophysical Year of 1957-58 confirmed it. The apparent physical problem was reconciled through a study of the solid-state properties of rock. It is deformable, and the hotter it gets, the more it deforms. Over geologic time the sum of very small deformations under steady pressure gives the impression of a flow.

The forces deforming the continental plates across the globe are found in the Earth's mantle, which has a liquid inner portion termed the asthenosphere and an outer, solid but deformable portion, the lithosphere. The liquid arranges itself by density, heaviest on the bottom, but there is a rising temperature gradient from outer to inner. The hot rock becoming less dense rises in plumes. When one reaches the surface it spreads out, forcing the lithosphere apart. New plate is extruded as lava fills the gap. On the other side of the plate the now cooler material dives down, or is subducted, beneath the adjacent plate. Orogenies, therefore, are a result of either divergent boundaries, in which divergence thins and weakens the lithosphere allowing magma to escape, building a chain of volcanoes (Ring of Fire or mid-ocean ridge configuration), or convergent boundaries. In the latter one plate is subducted under another, raising its margin into a mountain chain.

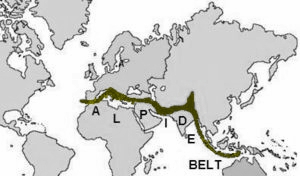
The Alpides

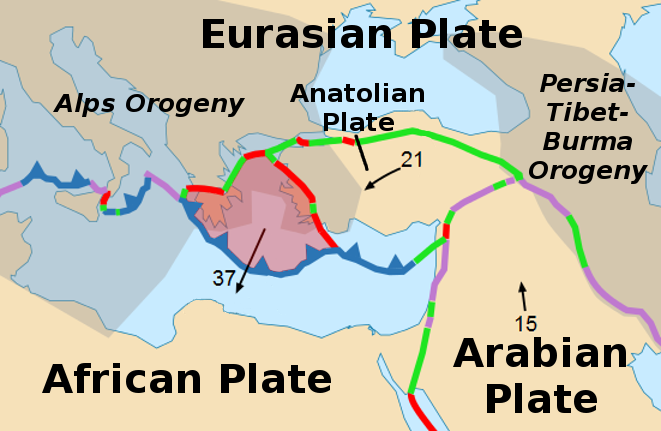
The microplates, Aegean and Anatolian, which are still forming by breaking away from the Eurasian plate. The blue line is the zone of subduction, formerly of Africa under Eurasia. The triangles indicate which plate is on top. The red line is the divergent border, caused by extension. The green line is a normal fault region, which will turn into a divergent border.

The Hellenic orogeny is part of a 15,000 km (9,300 mi) zone of convergence called the Alpide belt. If one can imagine the Eurasian Plate as an anvil, a number of other plates hammer against it from the south. The African Plate moving northward closes Tethys Ocean, the much vaster ancestress of the Mediterranean Sea, and raises the Pyrenees, the Alps, and the mountains of the Balkans. Further east, the Arabian Plate and the Indian Plate raise the Caucasus Mountains and Himalayas. The zone extends as far as Java and Sumatra. (Note: Cimmerides is "the orogenic system related to the obliteration of Paleo-Tethys". Alpides is "that generated during the closure of Neo-Tethys." Tethysides is the both together. The idea is that within the same orogenic zones the Alpides exist superimposed on the older Cimmerides.)

The Hellenic orogeny raised the Hellenides, a term in use in geology. The -ides suffix was the innovation of Eduard Suess, author of Das Antlitz der Erde ("The Face of the Earth"), and contemporary of Wegener. The features he was defining to be in the Earth's face are "long, continuous systems of folds which form the mountain chains of the Earth." The chains are arc-shaped, parallel ridges. They must have the same fold structure, which would be revealed by reconstructed cross-section. They must have the same plan revealed by the "trend-lines," one line being reconstructed from the strike lines of the ridges. Having innovated the concept of systems of folds, to avoid having to list every range in a system, Suess devised a naming method for a system by suffixing -ides to the name of a major range in it. Geology adopted his method and most of his names, even after the change to continental drift. (Note: The "-ides" names are innovated freely by geologists studying the rocks of specific regions. They are to a large extent produced words, which are words innovated from elements of known meanings to produce another meaning readily understood from its elements; e.g., ductile and ductibility.)

Suess' account of the Mediterranean begins with the subsidence of a zone across a Mesozoic supercontinent, Pangaea. The zone stretched from the Pacific to the Atlantic, dividing Pangaea into two forelands, Eurasia and Gondwana Land. (Note: A larger Africa, named by Suess from the beds in Gondwana of Central India.) Suess named the resulting sea Tethys, reusing a local name. Tethys received sediments from the adjoining lands until at last they were compressed upward to become roughly parallel mountain chains striking in an E-W direction (with local variants). Suess needed a word for the chains. He named them collectively after one of the chief ranges, the Altai. The Altaides were all the chains across the entire band, the first of the Suess's "-ides" units.

Not enough was known of the mountains of Greece for Suess to distinguish them; he bundled them in with the Dinarides, the Dinaric Alps, which he viewed as a continuation of the Alpides, the mountains of the western Mediterranean, named after the Alps. Leopold Kober made changes to the system, discarding Altaides and applying Alpides to the entire system, hence the Alpide Belt. Hellenides was distinguished by the geologist, Jean Aubouin, in referring to a hypothetical Hellenides geosyncline. Aubouin developed his geosyncline theory before IGY 1957.

The Hellenides immediately after the Hellenic orogeny are to be viewed as a mountain chain continuous with the Dinarides extending across Greece in a NW-SE direction passing through what is now the northern Aegean and connecting to the mountains of southern Anatolia. The Aegean did not exist. The coastline was regular.

=== Pleistos rift valley ===
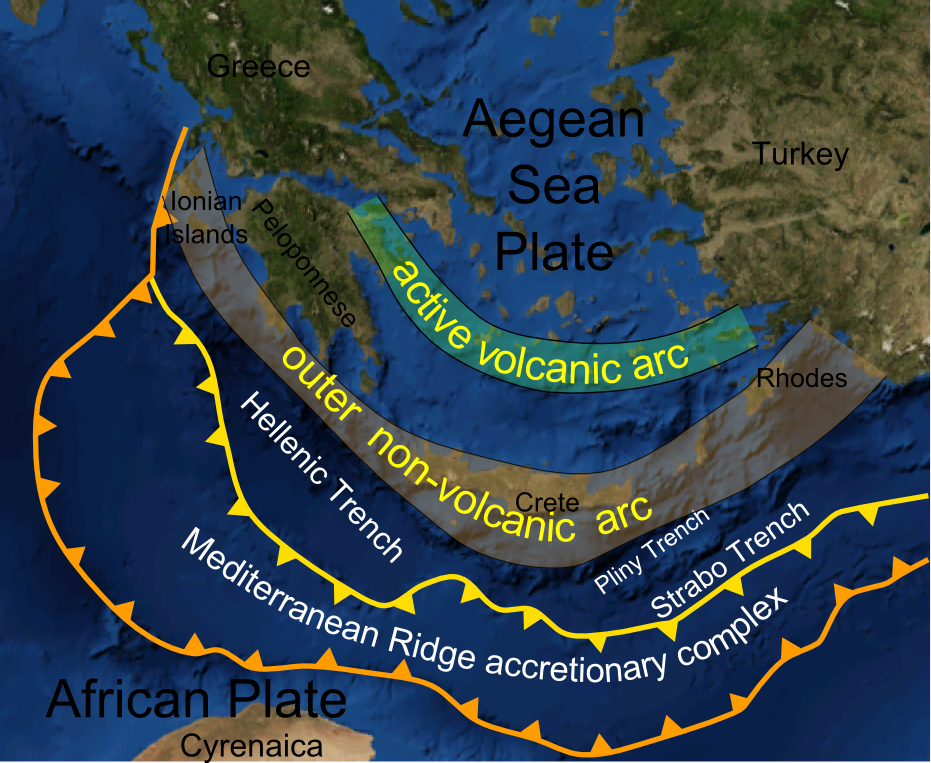
Generation of the Aegean Plate by back-arc extension. The arc is the southern margin of the plate. It is moving to the south as the weakened region to the north extends.

The Mediterranean is the remnant of the geologically ancient Tethys Sea being closed by the northward movement of the African Plate against the Eurasian Plate. The line of subduction of Africa under Eurasia runs in a general E-W direction through the Mediterranean. The southern margin of Eurasia rises over the subduction to become the mountains of the Alpide Zone as though they were folded up by compression, and to some extent they are. The subducted plate exerts a pressure on the overriding plate normal to the plane of contact. This force vector at any point of the boundary has a vertical component, pushing up the margin, and a horizontal component, compressing and folding the uplifted land.

One should therefore expect to find compression also beyond, or inward of the raised margin of the overriding plate, but this is not entirely the case. The margin is being extended out behind the arc of the raised mountains ("back-arc extension" meaning "in back of the arc"), and this extension, or stretching out, causes faults of the normal type instead of the compressional reverse type. (Note: The physical causes of back-arc extension are not known for sure, although there are some good theories, all of which may be true to some degree.) It is this extension that results in the maritime topography of modern Greece. The outer chain of the ridge resulting from the orogeny has broken loose and bent southward into the Hellenic arc. The land behind it has thinned and subsided into Aegean Sea. An arc of volcanos has broken through to form the volcanic Cyclades. The original subduction zone becomes the Hellenic Trench, a deep-sea depression roughly parallel to the outside of the Hellenic Arc.

The extension, which is still going on, causes faults and rifts across, or transverse, to the trend of the Hellenides, causing gaps in them. The major one of these is the Corinth Rift, which has opened across the NE-SW striking outer Hellenides, dividing them into the mountains of Central Greece and the mountains of the Peloponnesus. Another, younger rift (1 Ma), the Pleistos Valley, has opened to north of and parallel to the Corinthian Gulf. The scarp of its normal fault is still visible across the north wall of the valley.

An unusual circumstance has created the opportunity to found an oracle near the mouth of the valley. One of the reverse faults of the orogeny is cut transversely by the normal fault of the valley, dividing the north wall into two facing peaks, the Phaedriades. Water draining through the reverse fault enters the valley through a system of springs. The augmented scree provides more top space for terracing. Fortuitously the gap at the top of the scree resemble the vulva, inspiring a specific mythology of the "mother Earth" type. The ancients believed that clear water from springs was inspiring, hence the oracle. There may have been an augmented release of gases due to the intersection of faults, which may have inspired the oracular priestess, but the theory has not been proved. The augmented fault surface probably also increases the probability of earthquakes.

== Topography of the Pleistos valley ==
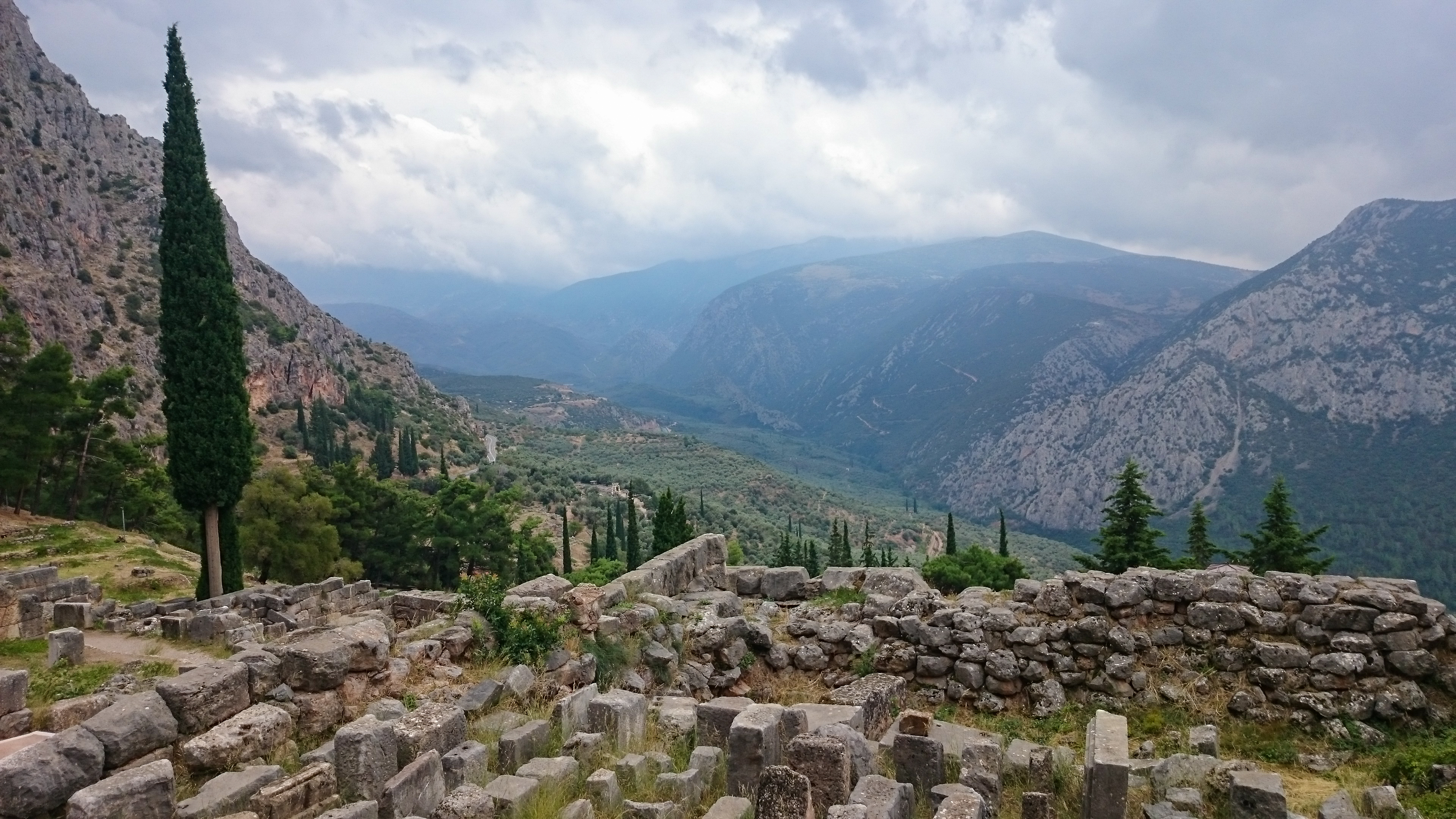
Looking up the Pleistos Valley from Delphi.

The Pleistos valley is not much of a rift valley. The rift is relatively recent, the separation is slight, and a scarp is still visible all the way from Amphissa to the head of the valley. It is not unmitigated, however. There are few places where the climber might have to ascend a thousand-foot cliff. Most of the scarp has been subject to extensive rockfalls and landslides, which have created a slope of scree up to about 50% of the scarp. The scree extends over the entire valley floor up to the Pleistos ravine. Slopes vary from very slight to up to 60°. The bare scarp varies from 60° to 90° and beyond, if there is an overhang. In general, the scree is on the footwall of the fault, but erosion has produced some overhangs.

There is no meander to speak of on the valley floor, and thus no plain, and but little agriculture. The rolling hills that have developed are suitable for dendroculture. There is also no room for any highway or any extensive structures. The surface is laced with dirt roads for access to the olive trees. Many of these ascend the scree. Delphi is not perched on a cliff; all the cliffs are above it. There is no problem ascending to Delphi or descending from it to tend to the trees. All builders, however, found it necessary to create terraces on which to place the structures. The archaeological site features multiple terraces with retaining walls. The Sacred Way must ascend to the terraces on ramps. Photographs from above showing the edges of the terraces are apt to be misleading. There is no drop-off. A grassy slope leads downward.

In modern times the access problem was solved by leveling the top of the scree and building a road there. The highway is good, two-lane, hard-top road, which gains or loses altitude in a few places by some hairpin legs. A highway fence lines the outside of the road. Many parking areas for viewing have been excavated into the scarp or placed on filled extensions to the width. The Sacred Precinct in particular has been provided with a large bus park. The road goes right through the middle of the site, creating an upper and a lower site. Most pictures, however, never show the road. They give the illusion of the scree merging directly to the bare scarp, which only happens at the top of the upper site.

== The valley in history ==
Solon of Athens is said to have used hellebore roots to poison the water in an aqueduct leading from the River Pleistos around 590 BC during the siege of Kirrha. The river Pleistos was also mentioned by the ancient geographers Strabo and Pausanias. Nowadays, the river has water mainly in the winter, whereas in the summer it dries out.

== Gallery ==
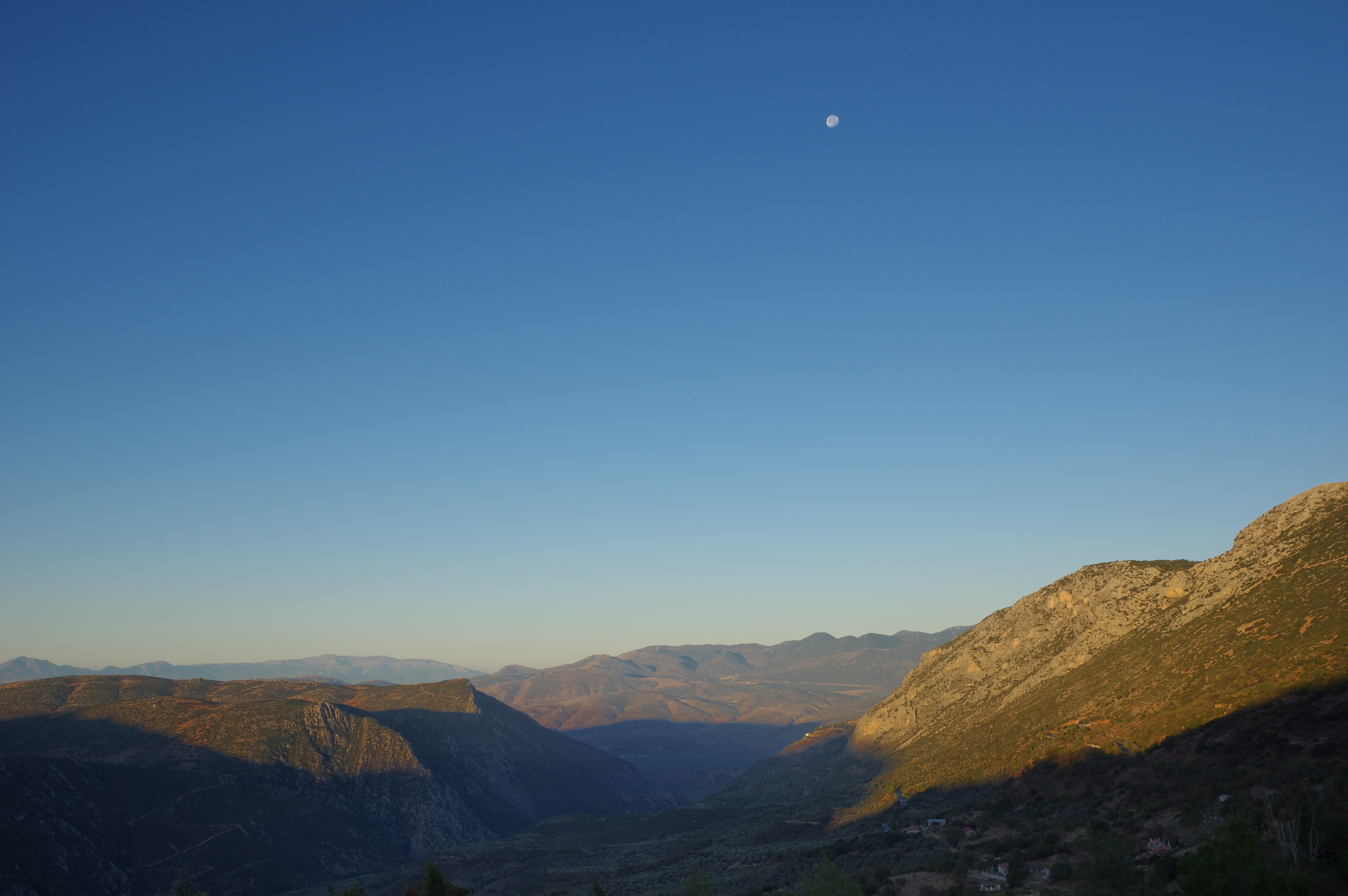
The head of the valley looking down to Arachova

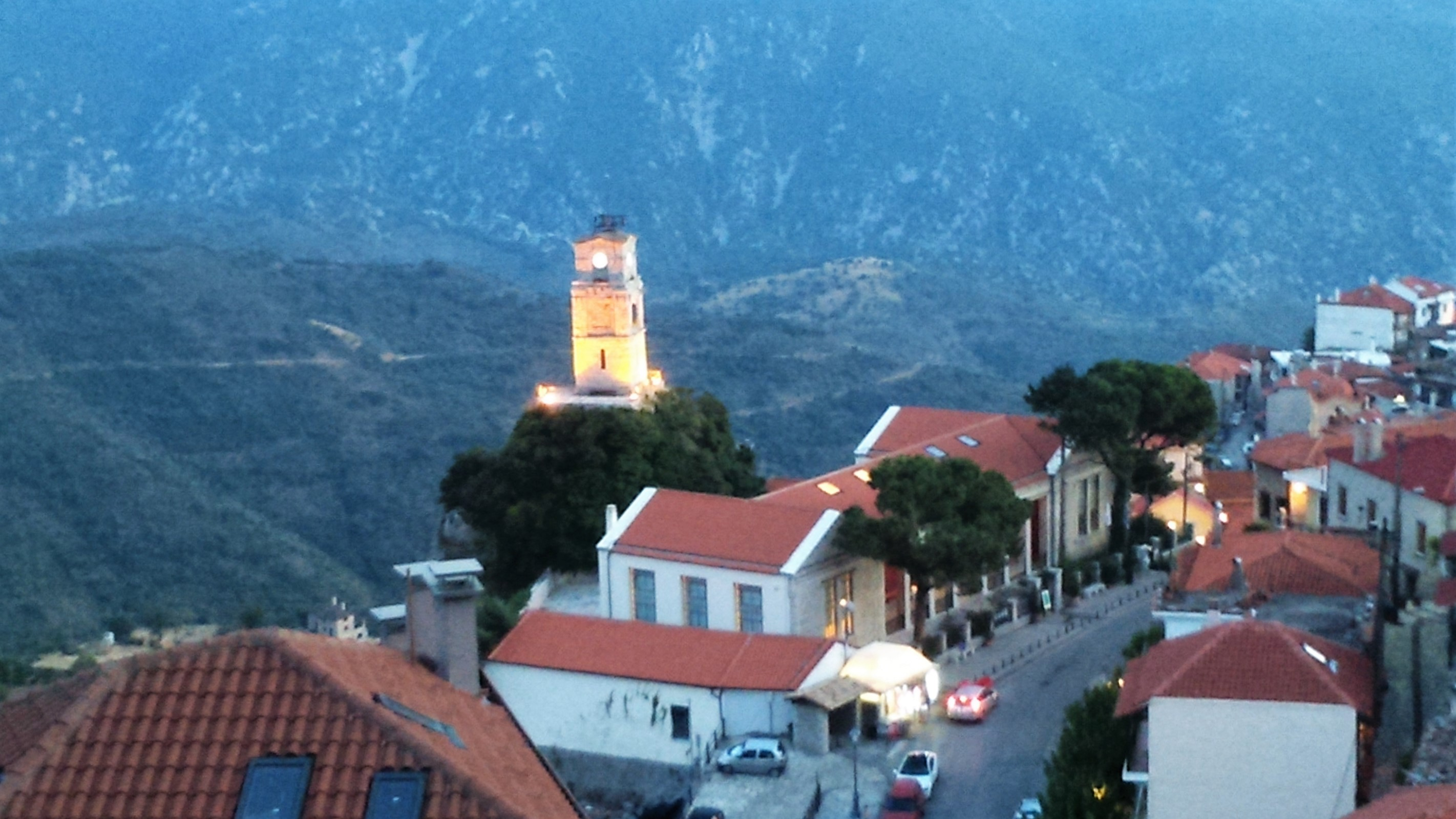
Downtown Arachova

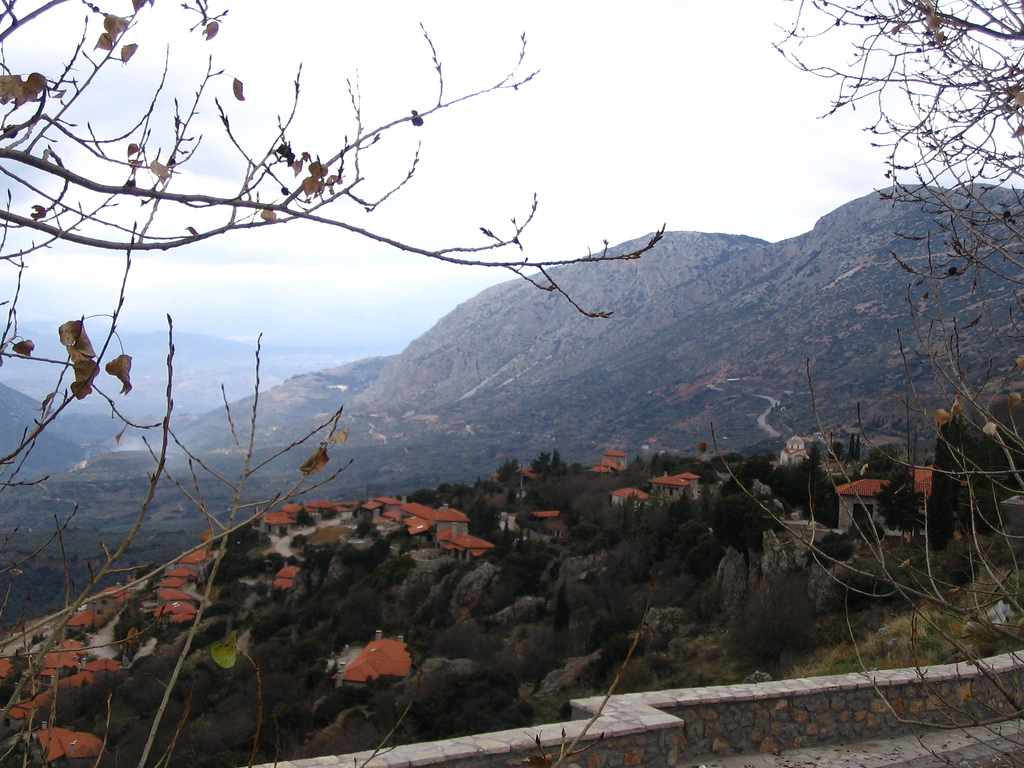
At Arachova looking down the valley

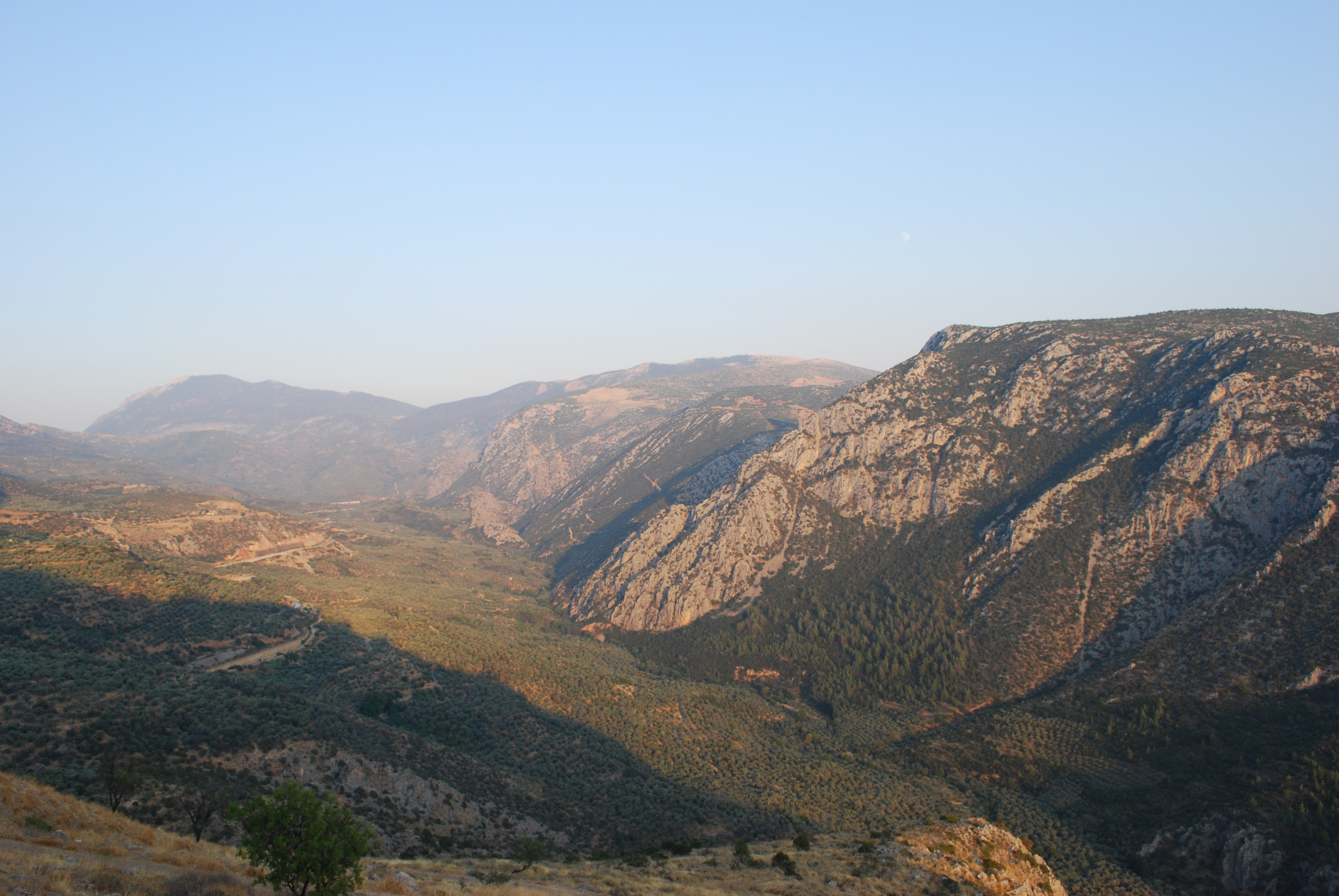
At Delphi looking up the Pleistos ravine

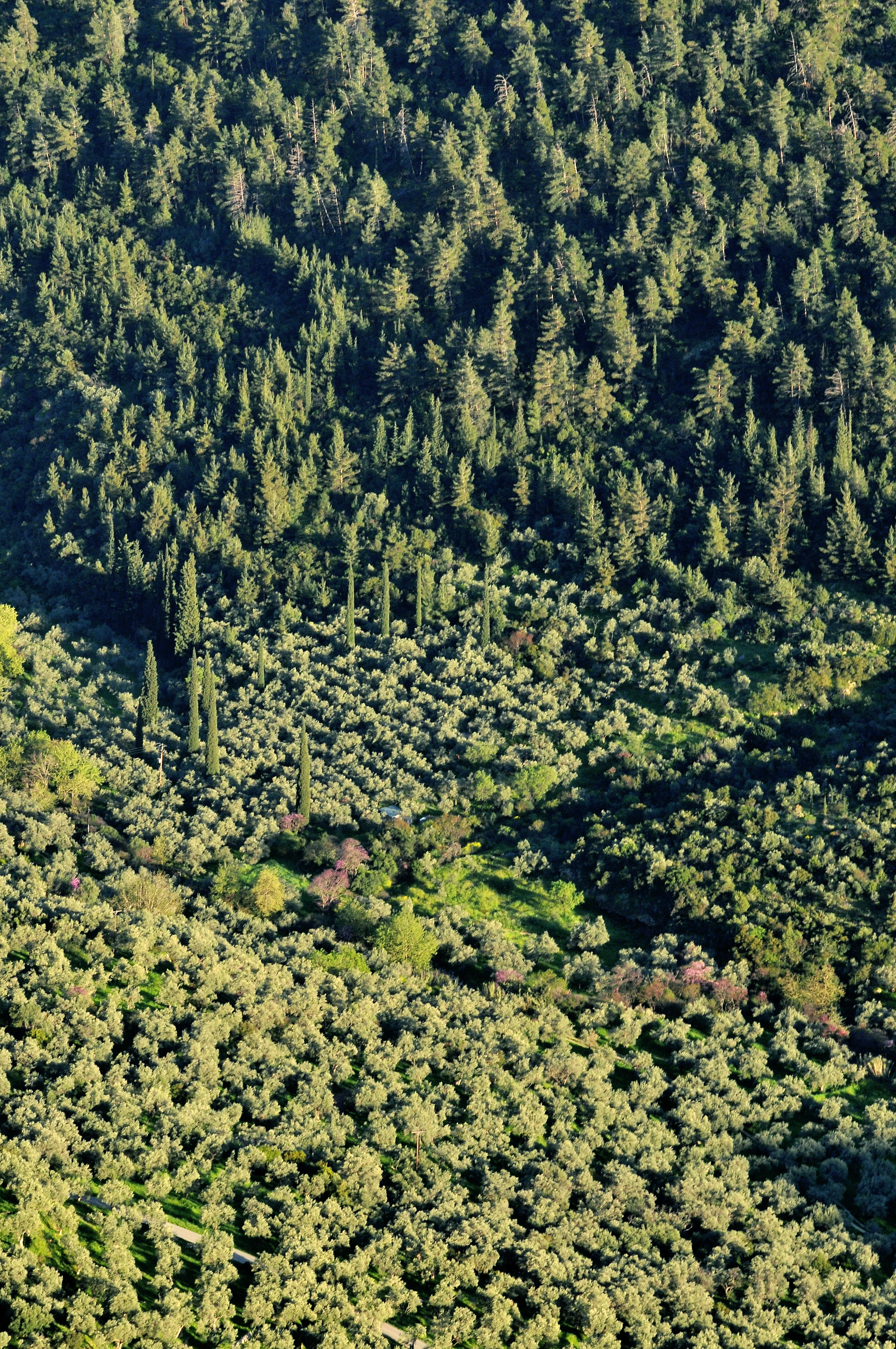
The sea of olives below Delphi

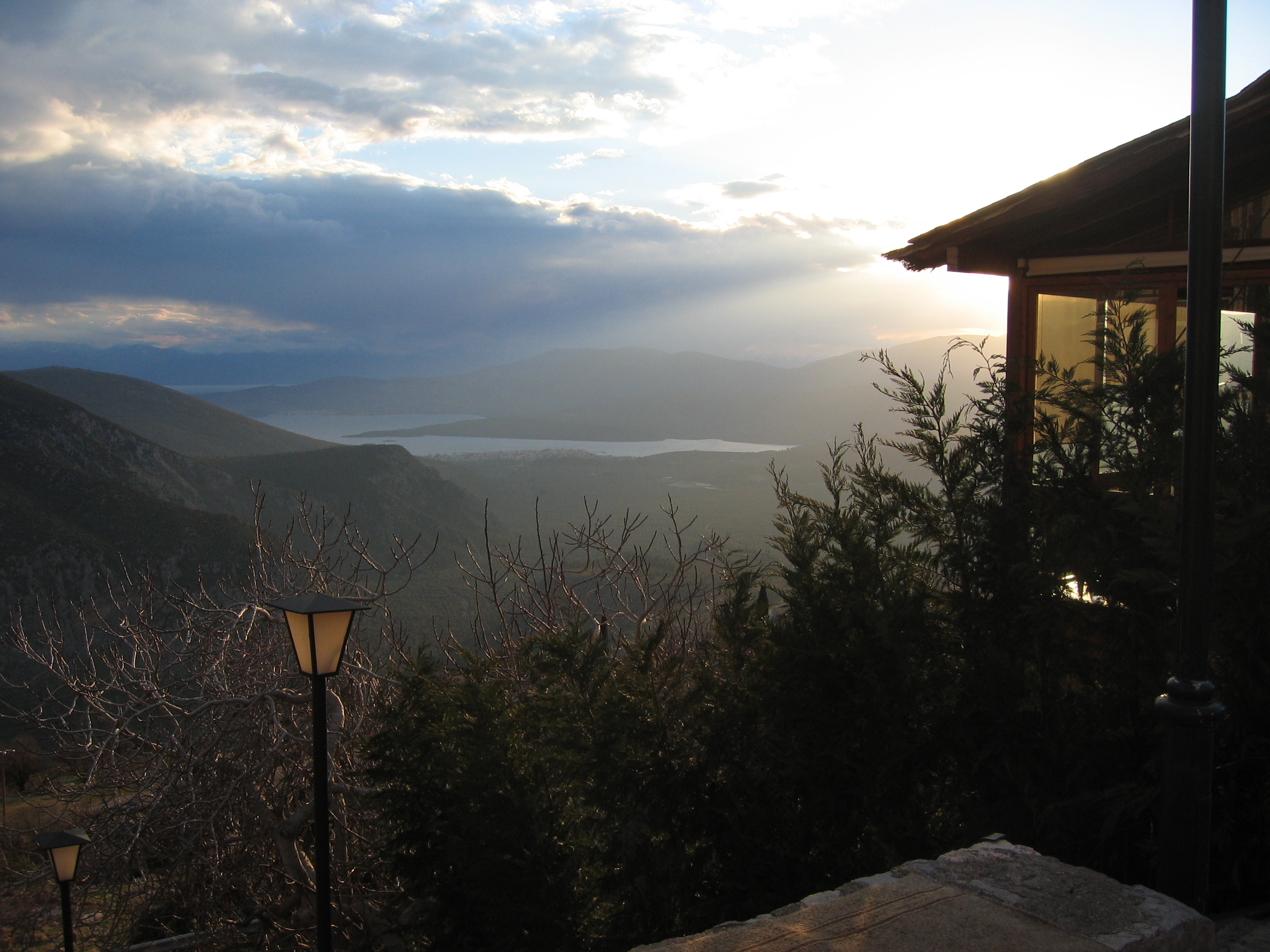
At the town of Delphi looking toward the gulf

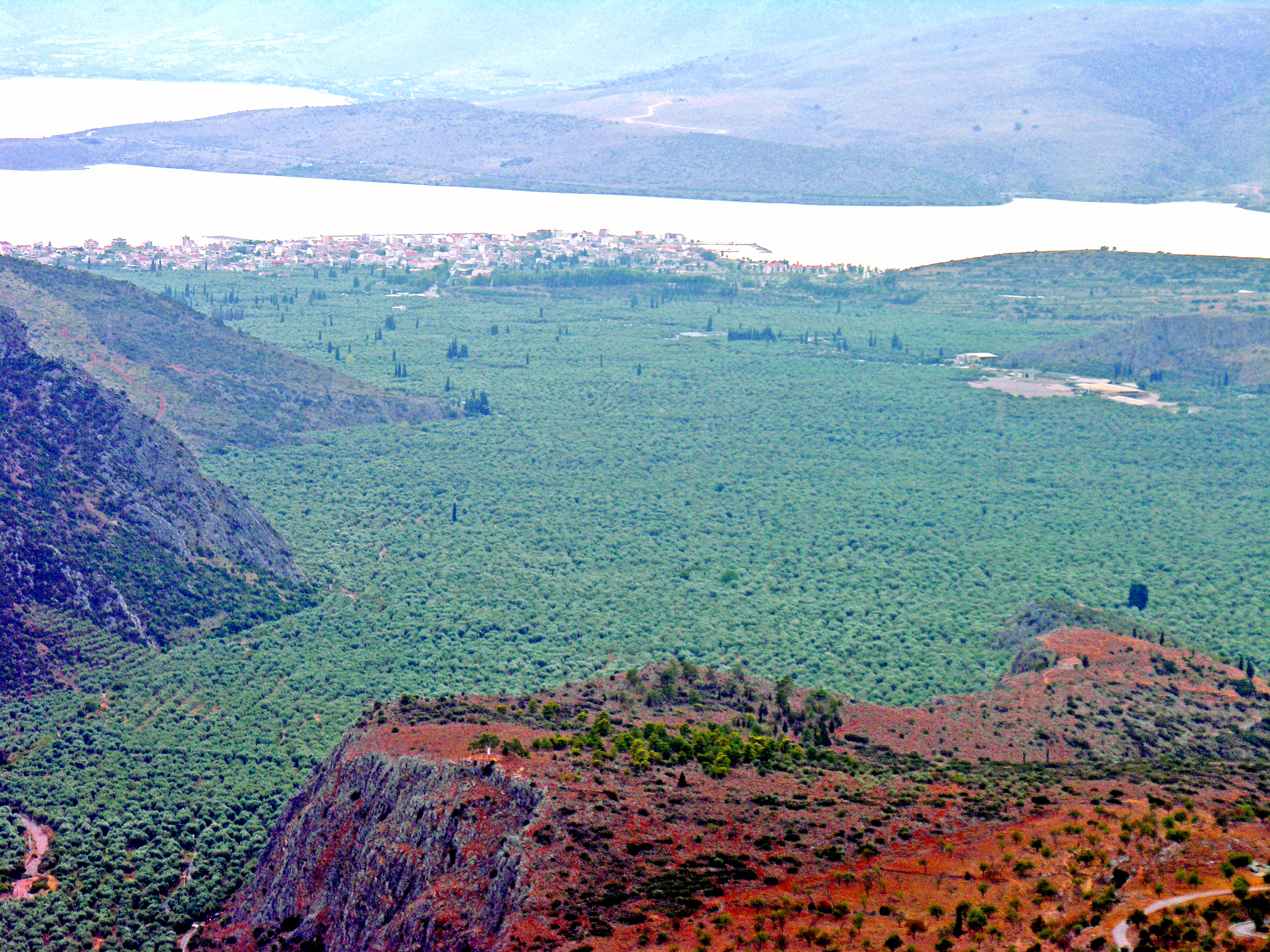
Itea from the scarp over the valley

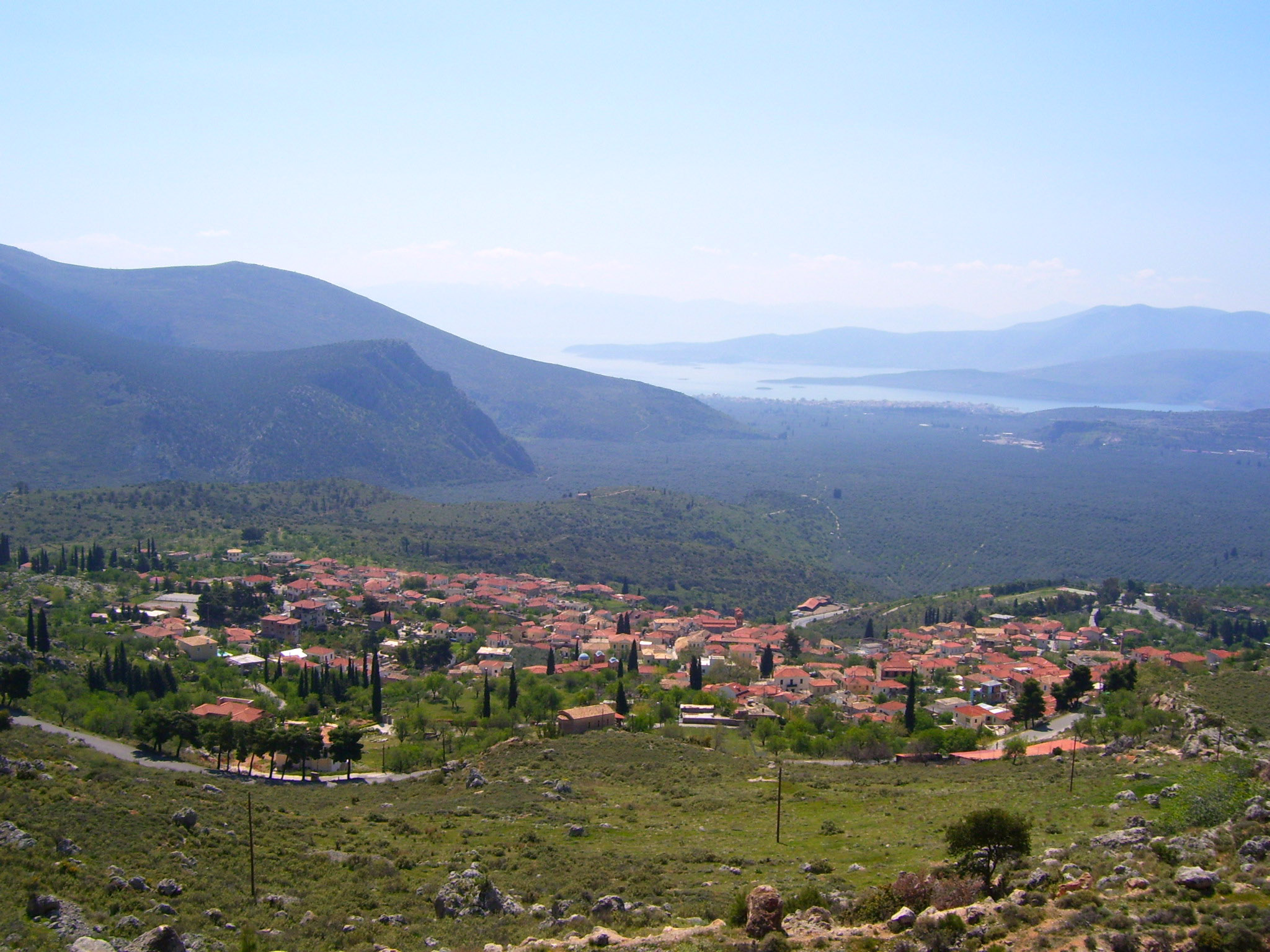
Chrisso overlooking the sea of olives, gulf in the background

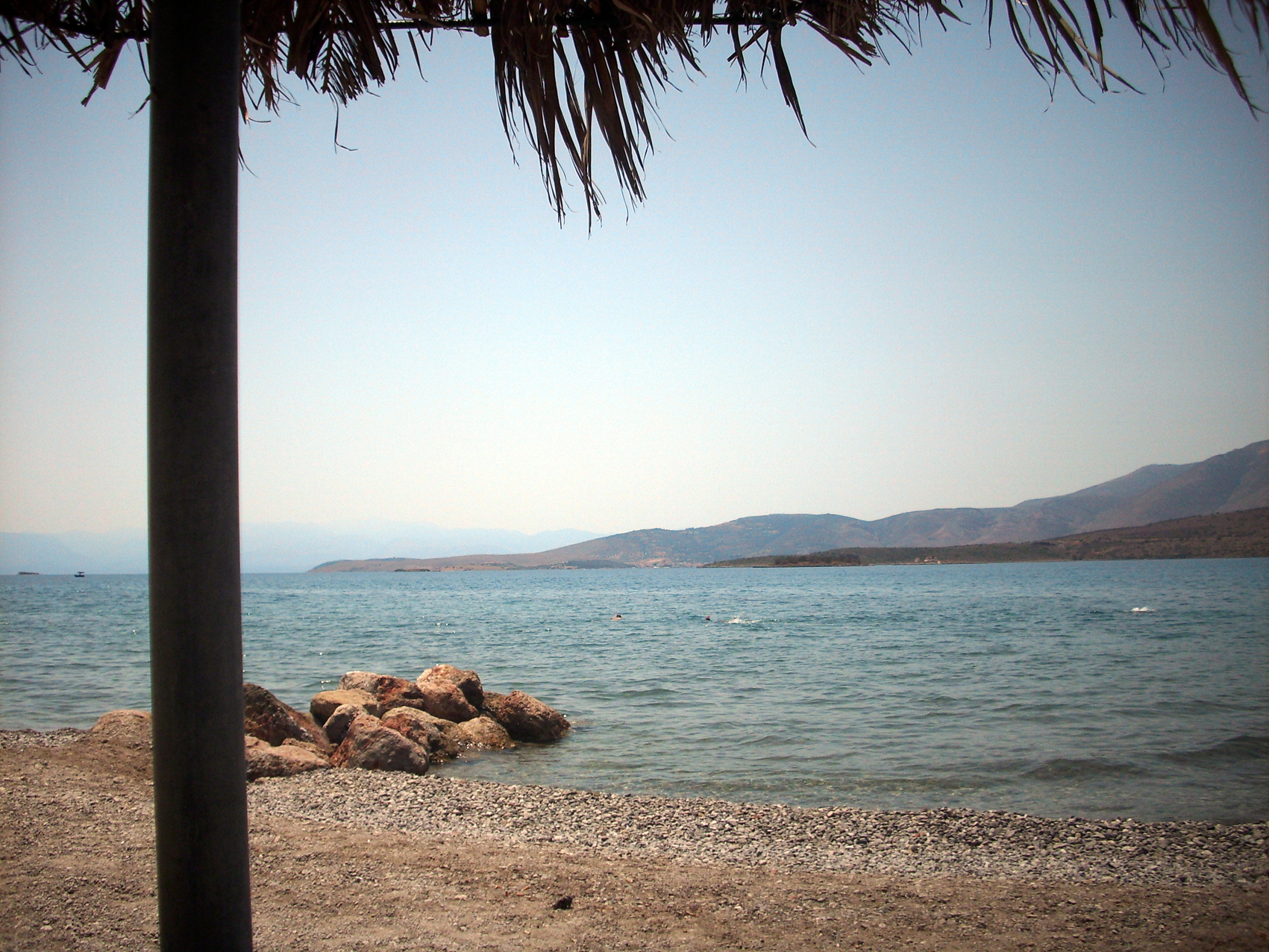
The beach at Itea

== See also ==
- Geology of Greece

== Citation references ==
- Piccardi, Luigi; et al. (2008). "Scent of a myth: tectonics, geochemistry and geomythology at Delphi (Greece)". Journal of the Geological Society, London. 165. Great Britain: 5–18.
- Suess, Eduard (1904). Sollas, W J (ed.). The face of the earth (Das antlitz der erde). Vol. I. Translated by Sollas, Hertha B C. Oxford: Clarendon Press.
- Suess, Eduard (1906). Sollas, W J (ed.). The face of the earth (Das antlitz der erde). Vol. II. Translated by Sollas, Hertha B C. Oxford: Clarendon Press.
- Suess, Eduard (1908). Sollas, W J (ed.). The face of the earth (Das antlitz der erde). Vol. III. Translated by Sollas, Hertha B C. Oxford: Clarendon Press.
- Suess, Eduard (1909). Sollas, W J (ed.). The face of the earth (Das antlitz der erde). Vol. IV. Translated by Sollas, Hertha B C. Oxford: Clarendon Press.
- Valkaniotis, Sotiris; Pavlides, Spyros (2018). The Delphi‐Amfissa Fault Zone, central Greece: active extension, morphotectonics and mass wasting at the northern part of Corinth Rift (Report). 9th International INQUA Meeting on Paleoseismology, Active Tectonics and Archeoseismology (PATA). Possidi, Greece: INQUA Focus Group Earthquake Geology and Seismic Hazards.
