= Anthela (Thessaly) =

Ancient Greek town and polis

Coordinates: 38°47′45″N 22°30′37″E

Anthela or Anthele (Ancient Greek: Ἀνθήλη) was a town and polis (city-state) of Malis in Ancient Thessaly. Herodotus places the town between the small river Phoenix and Thermopylae which was a celebrated pass between Thessaly and Phocis. He also mentions that the Thessalian Asopus river passed through its surroundings and that there was a sanctuary of Demeter, a place where the Amphictyonic League celebrated its meetings and a temple of Amphictyon. According to legend, the league was founded, in part, to protect the temple of Demeter at Anthela. Anthela is in the immediate vicinity of the pass of Thermopylae, celebrated for the temples of Amphictyon and of the Amphictyonic Demeter, containing seats for the members of the Amphicytonic council, who held here their autumnal meetings. At Anthela, Mount Oeta recedes a little from the sea, leaving a plain a little more than half a mile in breadth, but again contracts near Alpeni, the first town of the Locrians, where the space is again only sufficient for a single carriage. Modern scholars identify its location with the modern village of Anthili in the municipality of Lamia.

== Nomenclature ==
Hesiod mentions this town under the name Anthe (Ἄνθη). Stephanus of Byzantium calls the place Anthene (Ἄνθήνη).

== See also ==
- Temple of Demeter Amphictyonis
