= Asclepiad (title) =

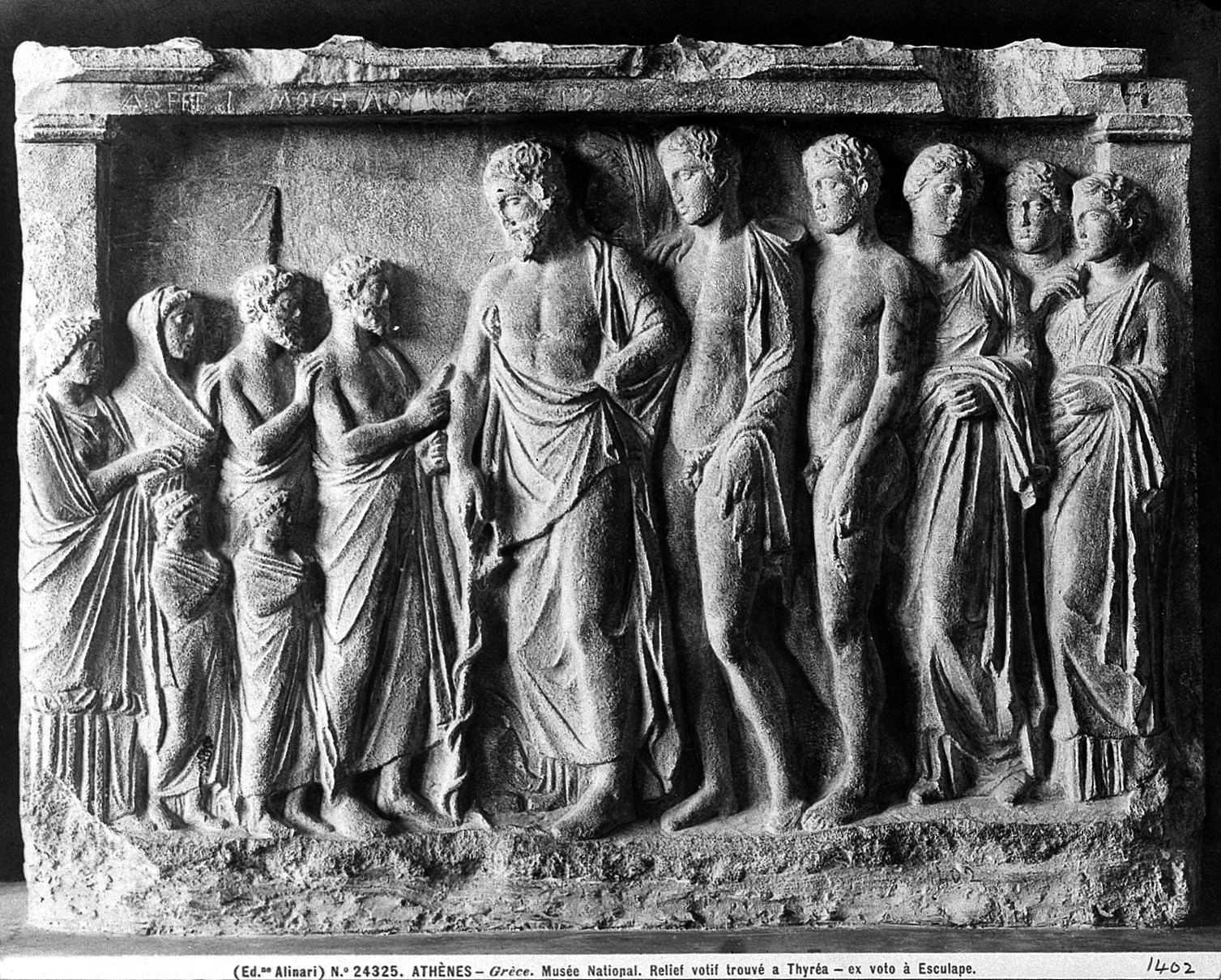
Aesculapius with his sons Podalairius and Machaon and three daughters - with supplicants

Asclepiad (Greek: Ἀσκληπιάδης, pl.: Ἀσκληπιάδαι) was a title borne by many Ancient Greek medical doctors, notably Hippocrates of Kos. It is not clear whether the Asclepiads were originally a biological family, or simply a member of an order or guild of doctors.

The Asclepiads may have originally been members of a family claiming descent from the god of healing Asclepius, with the name only later being adopted by all doctors; or they may always have been an association of medical men venerating the god as their founder.

Some hold that the Asclepiads were priests of Asclepion. The Asclepiadae could also have been a guild in honour of Asclepius, the Greek god of healing, separate from the healing temples and closely related to Hippocratic tradition. Plato gives Hippocrates this title in his Protagoras, referring to him as “Hippocrates of Kos, the Asclepiad”. It may also have been used to refer to a group of people who claimed to be descended from Asclepius.

Asclepiades was the name of several Hellenistic physicians, some of whom probably assumed this appellation either as a sort of honorary title in allusion to the ancient family of the Asclepiadae, or in order to signify that they themselves belonged to it, or even just to indicate that they were proficient healers.

== See also ==
- Asclepiades of Bithynia, (ca. 125–40 BC) philosopher and physician
- Asclepiades Pharmacion, (1st-2nd century) Greek physician
- Hippocrates, who was raised as an Asclepiad.

== Bibliography ==
- Jacques Jouanna, Greek Medicine from Hippocrates to Galen: Selected Papers, Brill Studies in Ancient Medicine 40, 2012, ISBN 9004208593, passim
- Jones, W. H. S. (1868), Hippocrates Collected Works I, Cambridge Harvard University Press.
- Jowett, B. (1927). "Protagoras". In William Chase Greene (ed.). The Dialogues of Plato. New York: Liveright Publishing Corp.
- Rutkow, Ira M. (1993), Surgery: An Illustrated History, London and Southampton: Elsevier Science Health Science div, ISBN 0-8016-6078-5
