= First Sacred War =

Ancient military conflict

Date	595–585 BC
Location	Mainland Greece
Result	Destruction of Kirrha and liberation of Delphi

Belligerents
Delphic Amphictyony; Sicyon	Kirrha

Commanders and leaders
Cleisthenes of Sicyon; Solon; Alcmaeon; Eurylochos; Hippias of Thessaly; Nebros	

The First Sacred War, or Cirraean War, was fought between the Amphictyonic League of Delphi and the city of Kirrha. At the beginning of the 6th century BC, the Pylaeo-Delphic Amphictyony, controlled by the Thessalians, attempted to take hold of the Sacred Land (or Kirrhaean Plain) of Apollo, resulting in this war. The conflict arose due to Kirrha's frequent robbery and mistreatment of pilgrims going to Delphi and their encroachments upon Delphic land. The war, which culminated with the defeat and destruction of Kirrha, is notable for the use of chemical warfare at the Siege of Kirrha, in the form of hellebore being used to poison the city's water supply. The war's end was marked by the organization of the first Pythian Games.

== Siege of Kirrha ==
The leader of the attack was the Tyrant Cleisthenes of Sicyon, who used his powerful navy to blockade the city's port before using an allied Amphictionic army to besiege Kirrha. The Athenians also participated with a contingent led by Alcmaeon. On the Thessalian side, the leaders were Eurylochos and Hippias. What transpired after this is a matter of debate: the earliest, and therefore probably most reliable, account is that of the medical writer Thessalos. He wrote, in the 5th century BC, that the attackers discovered a secret water-pipe leading into the city after it was broken by a horse's hoof. An asclepiad named Nebros advised the allies to poison the water with hellebore, which soon rendered the defenders so weak with diarrhea that they were unable to resist the assault. Kirrha was captured and the entire population was slaughtered. Nebros was considered an ancestor of Hippocrates, so this story has caused many to wonder whether it might not have been guilt over his ancestor's use of poison that drove Hippocrates to establish the Hippocratic Oath.

Later historians told different stories. According to Frontinus, who wrote in the 1st century AD, after discovering the pipe, the Amphictionic League cut it, leading to great thirst within the city. They then restored the pipe and the desperate Kirrhans immediately began drinking the water, unaware that Kleisthenes had poisoned it with hellebore. According to Polyaenus, a writer of the 2nd century the attackers added the hellebore to the spring from which the water came. Polyaenus also gave credit for the strategy not to Kleisthenes but to General Eurylochus, who he claimed advised his allies to gather a large amount of hellebore from Anticyra, where it was abundant. The stories of Frontinus and Polyaenus both have the same result as Thessalos's tale: the defeat of Kirrha.

The last major historian to advance a new story of the siege was Pausanias, who was active in the 2nd century. In his version of events, Solon of Athens diverted the course of the River Pleistos to avoid passing through Kirrha but the enemy was able to get enough water from their wells and rainwater collection. Solon then added a great quantity of hellebore to the water of the Pleistos and let it flow into Kirrha.

== Outcome of the War ==
The First Sacred War ended with the victory of the allies of the Amphictyony. Kirrha was destroyed and its lands were dedicated to Apollo, Leto and Artemis and it was forbidden to cultivate them or let animals graze on them. Its inhabitants fled to mountain of Kirphe. Cleisthenes was generously rewarded with one third of the booty. In order to celebrate the end of the fighting, the first Pythian Games were organized with Cleisthenes playing a major part in them. However, modern scholarship is very skeptical on the exact events and on the long duration of the war.

== See also ==
- Second Sacred War
- Third Sacred War

== Bibliography ==
- Forrest, G. G., “The first Sacred War”, BCH 80 (1956), 33-52.
- Jannoray, J., “Krisa, Kirrha et la première guerre sacrée“, BCH 61 (1937), 33-43.
