= Mount Cirphis =

Mountain in Greece

Coordinates: 38°27′40″N 22°38′29″E

Cirphis or Kirphis or Kirfis (Ancient Greek: Κίρφις, romanized: Kírphis, Latin: Cirphis Mons) is a mountain in Greece north of the Bay of Antikyra in the Gulf of Corinth. It is separated from Mount Parnassus by the valley of the Pleistos. In antiquity, it was reckoned as part of the district of Phocis.
