= Amphictyonic league =

Pre-polis type of ancient Greek confederacy

In Archaic Greece, an amphictyony (Ancient Greek: ἀμφικτυονία, a "league of neighbors"), or Amphictyonic League, was an ancient religious association of tribes formed before the rise of the Greek polis.

The six Dorian cities of coastal southwest Anatolia and the twelve Ionian cities to their north that formed the Ionian League after a Meliac war in the mid-7th century BC were already of considerable antiquity when the first written records emerged.

== The First Amphictyony ==
The oldest religious Amphictyonic League was known as Anthelian because it was centered on the cult of the chthonic goddess Demeter at Anthela. The twelve delegates were entitled Pylagorai (gate-assemblers), perhaps a reference to the local Gates of Hades, since Demeter was a chthonic goddess in her older local cults. The immediate dwellers-round were some small states, including Achaea-Phthiotis, that paved the way for the entry of the body of the rest Boeotian tribes which were living around Thessaly (perioikoi). Boeotia and Phocis, the most remote locations, joined only during or after the "First Sacred War", which led to the defeat of the old priesthood and to a new control of the prosperity of the oracle at Delphi.

As a result of the war the Anthelan body was known thenceforth as the Delphic Amphictyony and became the official overseer and military defender of the Delphic cult. A strange and revealing anti-Thessalian feeling appeared and a wall was built across the narrow defile at Thermopylae to keep the Thessalians out.

It is suggested that the Shield of Heracles may reflect anti-Thessalian feeling after the First Sacred War. In this epic, a Thessalian hero interfering with the Phoecian sanctuary is killed by a Boeotian hero, Heracles, whose mortal father, Amphitryon, had for allies Locrians and Phoecians. This was made to be sung at a Boeotian festival at midsummer at the hottest time of the Dog Star, Sirius.

The name Hellenes is related to the members of the league and was broadened to refer to all Greeks when the myth of their patriarch, Hellen, was invented. In Greek mythology, Amphictyon was brother of Hellen, and Graecus was son of his sister Pandora. According to the Parian Chronicle, the previously-named Graeces were renamed Hellenes.

== Ancient historiography ==
An amphictyony consisting of polities under the aegis of Apollo's shrine at Delos was well-established in the seventh century. The Homeric Hymn to Delian Apollo of that approximate date lists them. Those cities and islands that trembled and refused to offer themselves for the birthplace of Apollo when pregnant Leto went to each in turn. The Homeric hymn presents an origin myth for the cult of Apollo on Delos. The joint Ionian festival celebrated there was the Delia. The Delian Amphictyony arose in the 4th century BC as an instrument of Athenian hegemony.

Thucydides made recollection of the Lelantine War when writing, "The war between Chalcis and Eretria was the one in which most cities belonging to the rest of Greece were divided up into alliances with one side or the other." The Lelantine War was fought in Euboea at some point between the late 8th century BC and the first half of the 7th century BC.

Historians have puzzled over the broader meanings of "alliance" in such early times. However, as George Forrest notes, "large-scale associations lead more readily to contacts, to friendships and enmities at a distance than do little city-like units." This explains why Phrygia and Assyria were at war with each other about 720–710, raising tensions among interested Greeks.

An amphictyony would survive as a form of religious organization enjoined to support specific temples or sacred places. Traditional amphictyonies coordinated Olympic and Pythian Games. Twelve members would meet at specific times in the same sanctuary to keep religious festivals and conduct other matters as well.

An early amphictyony centered on Kalaureia, an island close to the coast of Troezen in the Peloponnese and sacred to Poseidon, was noted by Strabo. Archaeology of the site suggested to Thomas Kelly that the sacred league was founded in the second quarter of the 7th century BCE, c. 680–650. Before that date, there were virtually no remains at the site, which were not used more than sporadically. The island was known at one time as Eirene (Εἰρήνη) ("Peace"), which is in reference to the amphictyony. Strabo lists the polis that belonged: "And there was also a kind of amphictyonic league connected with this temple, a league of seven cities which shared in the sacrifice; they were Hermione, Epidaurus, Aegina, Athens, Prasïeis, Nauplïeis, and Orchomenus Minyeius; however, the Argives paid dues for the Nauplians, and the Lacedaemonians for the Prasians."

== Delphic Amphictyony ==
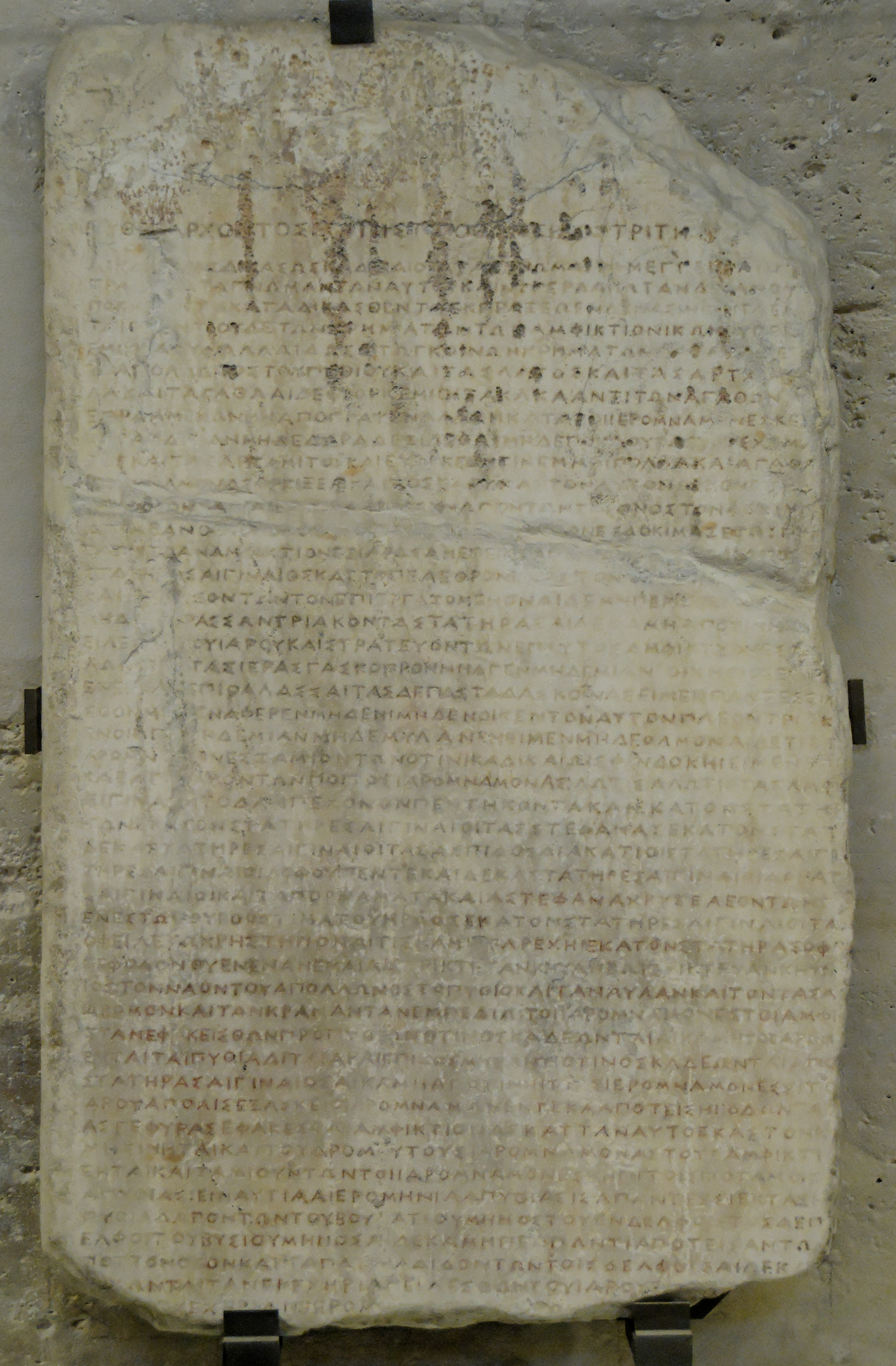
Amphictyonic law of Delphi (4th century BCE, marble, from Aegina, now in the Louvre)

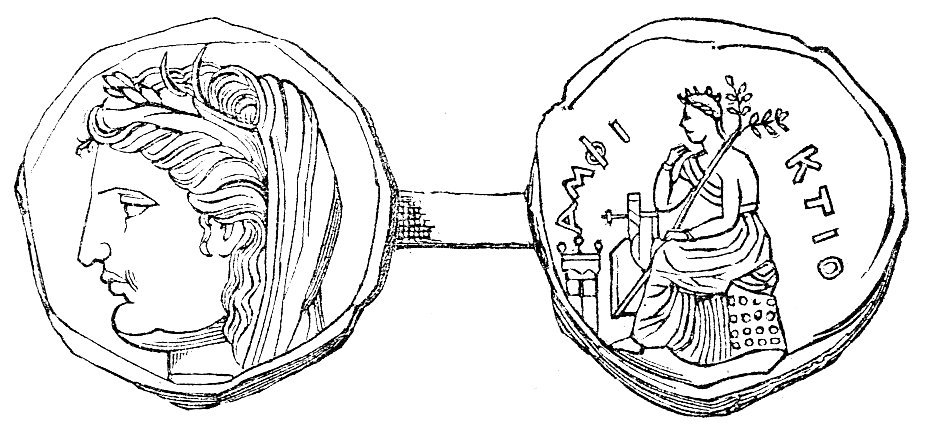
Silver stater from Delphi, 336 BCE, issued in the name of Amphictyonic Council of Delphi

The least obscure and longest lasting amphictyony was the Delphic Amphictyony that was organized to support the greater temples of Apollo and Demeter. Its council had religious authority and the power to pronounce punishments against offenders which ranged from fines to expulsion. They also had the ability to conduct sacred wars. The Amphictyonic League also set the rules of battle so as to protect sanctuaries and impose sentences on those who molested sanctuaries. All members were obliged to pledge themselves by an oath as reported by Aeschines.

Based on legend, the Great Amphictyonic League was founded somewhat after the Trojan War, for the protection and administration of the temple of Apollo in Delphi and temple of Demeter in Anthela (Ἀνθήλη), near Thermopylae. The founding myth claimed that it had been founded in the most distant past by an eponymous founder Amphictyon, brother of Hellen, the common ancestor of all Hellenes. Representatives of the twelve members (called hieromnemones) met in Thermopylae in spring and in Delphi in autumn.

Many different sources have noted eleven to thirteen founding populations. The list below is as enumerated by Aeschines:

- The Aenianes or Oetaeans (Αἰνιᾶνες, Οἰταῖοι)
- The Boeotians (Βοιωτοί)
- The Dolopes (Δόλοπες)
- The Dorians (Δωριείς)
- The Ionians (Ἴωνες)
- The Phthian (Φθιῶται) Achaeans (Ἀχαιοί)
- The Locrians (Λοκροί) [divided into the eastern Opuntians (Ὀπούντιοι) and western Ozolians (Ὀζολοί)]
- The Magnesians (Μάγνητες)
- The Malians (Μαλιεῖς)
- The Perrhaebians (Περραιβοί)
- The Phoecians (Φωκεῖς)
- The Pythians (Πύθιοι) of Delphi
- The Thessalians (Θεσσαλοί)

The League doctrine required that no member would be entirely wiped out in war and no water supply of any member would be cut even in wartime. It did not prevent members from fighting about the dominance over the temples.

== Sacred Wars ==
Originally a religious organization, the Delphic Amphictyonic League became politically important in the 6th century BCE, when larger city-states began to use it to apply pressure to the lesser ones.

The Oracle managed to become independent from the city of Krissa, to which the temple originally belonged. The people of Krissa then imposed a tax on those who were passing through their area to go to Delphi, causing strong complaints and reducing the resources of the Oracle. The Amphictyony, having exhausted all other means to peacefully resolve the crisis, declared the First Sacred War (or Cirrhean War) against Krissa that lasted a decade, from 596 to 585 BCE. The result was the destruction of Krissa and the dedication of this country to Apollo, Leto, Artemis, and Athena Pronaia. After this, the Pythian Games were held every four years, under the direction of the Amphictyons.

In 449 or 448, Sparta seized Delphi from the Phocians who controlled it: this was the Second Sacred War. After the Spartans' departure, the Athenians, led by Pericles, gave back to the Phoecians the rule of Delphi and the management of the Pythian Games. In 421, after the Peace of Nicias, Delphi became autonomous again. It is unlikely, however, that Phoecis remained in control of Delphi after members of the Boeotian League defeated Athens at the Battle of Coronea (447 BCE).

In 356 the Phoecians under Philomelos captured and looted Delphi, and a Third Sacred War was declared against them. After ten years of war, in 346, the Phoecians were expelled from the League and their two votes were given to Macedon, which had helped to defeat them. Philip II of Macedonia used this power to further his expansionist policy in Greece. This resulted in the Fourth Sacred War which culminated in the Battle of Chaeronea (338 BCE), marking the final domination of the Macedonians over Greece.

== Decline ==
In 279 the Delphic Amphictyony admitted as new members the Aetolian League, who had successfully defended the sanctuary as well as the rest of mainland Greece against the Gauls. At this instance the Phoecians were also readmitted for having also participated at the defense of the region. In the 3rd century the Soteria (festival) was held in honour of the Greek victory against the Gauls. By 191 the League had 17 members but only the most dominant one had the two votes, when others had only one. The league continued to exist under the Roman Empire but its authority was limited to the care of the temple of Apollo at Delphi. The Roman emperor Augustus incorporated the Aenianes, Malians, Magnetians and Pythians with the Thessalians. Since the Dolopes had meanwhile vanished, he gave their vote to the city of Nicopolis.

The Amphictyonic League gradually declined and in the 2nd century CE it was replaced by the Panhellenion, established by the Roman emperor Hadrian. However, the see of the Amphictyonic League was in Athens, the emperor's favorite city. Thus, it seems that the Amphictyony lost influence and came to an end, although we have no specific date for its actual cessation.

== See also ==
- Calaurian Amphictyony
- Panionium
