= List of women in the Heritage Floor =

This list documents all 998 mythical, historical and notable women whose names are displayed on the handmade white tiles of the Heritage Floor as part of Judy Chicago's The Dinner Party art installation (1979); there is also one man listed, Kresilas, who was mistakenly included in the installation as he was thought to have been a woman called Cresilla. The names appear as they are spelled on the floor. Since 2007 the installation has been on permanent exhibition in the Elizabeth A. Sackler Center for Feminist Art at the Brooklyn Museum, New York.

This is a sortable list. Click on the column headers to reorder.

Name	Birthdate	Location	Group (Related Place Setting)	Notes
Abella of Salerno	Flourished c. 1350	Salerno, Italy	Trotula	Taught general medicine at Schola Medica Salernitana, the earliest medical school in Europe. She specialised in embryology, and published two treatises.
Abigail	Flourished c. 965 BC	Ancient Israel	Judith	Earliest female pacifist in Biblical record. Her husband defied the future King David and to avoid war, she went behind her husband's back and prepared food for David, in order to keep the peace. Her husband died from the shock of her actions, and she would go on to become the third wife of David.
Abigail Adams	1744	Massachusetts, United States	Anne Hutchinson	Abolitionist, women's education advocate, influential political figure.
Adela of Blois	c. 1067	France	Eleanor of Aquitaine	Acted as regent while her husband, Stephen Henry, participated in the First Crusade.
Adela Zamudio	1854	Cochabamba, Bolivia	Virginia Woolf	Poet, intellectual and founder of the Bolivian feminist movement.
Adelaide	931	France	Theodora	Empress of the Holy Roman Empire, who acted as co-ruler with her husband, Otto the Great.
Adélaïde Labille-Guiard	1749	France	Artemisia Gentileschi	Portrait painter, member of the Académie Royale, women's education advocate.
Adelaide of Susa	c. 1016	Italy	Eleanor of Aquitaine	Philanthropist, heiress, countess of Savoy. She also led an army to defend Turin.
Adelperga	8th century	Italy	Trotula	Lombard princess, known for fighting against Charlemagne. Incorrectly identified as a lay healer named Adelberger due to a passage in Kate Campbell Hurd-Mead's History of Women in Medicine.
Adelheid Popp	1869	Vienna, Austria	Susan B. Anthony	Leader of the Austrian Socialist Women's Movement, served in Austrian government.
Eudocia	c. 400	Athens; Jerusalem	Theodora	Philanthropist, politician, poet, was an Orthodox Christian who fought for the protection of Jews and pagans
Eudoxia	380	Constantinople	Theodora	Empress of Byzantium who influenced the political work of her husband, Emperor Arcadius.
Aemilia	c. 300	Gaul	Hypatia	Poet and physician, rejected marriage as it was a hindrance to her career. Wrote books about gynecology and obstetrics.
Æthelburg	c. 673	England	Theodora	Queen of Wessex alongside husband King Ine of Wessex. Fought battles alongside Ine. In 728, they relinquished the crown to her brother and went on pilgrimage to Rome, where they spent their final days.
Ethelberga	5th Century	England	Hrosvitha	Duplicate entry for Bertha of Kent, as shown by the death date on her Heritage Panel. Identified as a separate person due to a passage in Kate Campbell Hurd-Mead's History of Women in Medicine, where she is conflated with both Æthelburh of Kent and Æthelburh of Barking.
Æthelflæd	869	England	Theodora	Led troops against the Vikings. After her husband, Æthelred, died, she became the sole ruler of Mercia.
Agatha	c. 235	Sicily	Hypatia	Rejected the advances of Roman military officials and was tortured by having her breasts cut off, then, she was sentenced to burn at the stake but was saved by an earthquake. She died in prison and was canonized by the Church. She is the patron saint of breast cancer patients.
Ageltrude Benevento	9th century	Italy	Trotula	Holy Roman Empress. Used her political power to have her son, Lambert, confirmed as emperor, and also to support the election of Pope Stephen VI.
Aglaonice	Between 4th and 2nd centuries BC	Greece	Aspasia	Believed to be the first woman astronomer. She could accurately predict lunar eclipses, thus gaining a reputation for sorcery, as people believed her ability to predict was actually the ability to create the eclipses.
Agnes d'Harcourt	13th century	France	Hildegarde of Bingen	Abbess of the Abbey of Longchamp and author. She wrote the first biography about Saint Isabel, for whom she was a personal assistant.
Agnes	Flourished c. 1184	Germany	Hrosvitha	Abbess of St. Mary's in Quedlinburg, where fine needlework and weavings were created, as well as manuscript illustrations. Agnes encouraged artistic creation and supported a healthy art industry with her nuns' creations.
Agnes	1211	Bohemia	Hildegarde of Bingen	Former Bohemian princess who joined the Poor Clares religious order, founding an abbey and a hospital. Canonized in 1989, she is the patron saint of Bohemia.
Agnes of Poitou	c. 1024	France	Eleanor of Aquitaine	Second wife of Emperor Henry III; she governed the Holy Roman Empire on behalf of her son, Henry IV. She opposed the election of Pope Alexander II, and supported the claim of his rival, Pietro Cadalo, to the Papal throne. In 1062, her son Henry was kidnapped, and, as ransom to save his life, she resigned as regent and lived out the rest of her life in a convent.
Agnes of Dunbar	1312	Scotland	Christine de Pisan	Known as "Black Agnes." In 1337, she successfully defended her family's castle while her husband, Patrick V, Earl of March, was at war.
Agnes Sampson	16th century	Scotland	Petronilla de Meath	Healer, she was one of the accused at the North Berwick witch trials. She was tortured, and forced to confess to conspiring with 200 other women to work with the devil to try to kill King James VI. She was found guilty and executed in 1591.
Agnes Smedley	1892	United States	Virginia Woolf	Journalist, who traveled to Berlin in 1920 and helped opened Germany's first birth control clinic. She continued to travel the world, seeing human and political rights violations first hand. She wrote numerous books, including an autobiography and coverage on China during World War II.
Agnès Sorel	c. 1422	France	Isabella d'Este	Mistress of King Charles VII of France, as well as the first royal mistress to be publicly acknowledged. All four of their children were also formally acknowledged. She died of dysentery at the age of 28, but some believe she was poisoned.
Agnes Waterhouse	c 1503	England	Petronilla de Meath	One of the first women, after Elizabeth Lowys, to be executed for witchcraft in England.
Agnodice	c 505	Greece	Aspasia	First female gynecologist. She disguised herself as a man in order to go to medical school. She became a gynecologist, and when male doctors realized women preferred her services, they charged her with malpractice, forcing her to out herself. Afterwards, a law was passed prohibiting women from practicing medicine.
Agrippina I	c 14 BC	Rome	Marcella	Married Germanicus and accompanied him into battle during wartime. After his death, she became an advocate for her children's claim to the Imperial throne. As a result, she and her two teenage sons were accused of trying to overthrow Tiberius, leading to their exile and likely execution.
Agrippina II	15	Rome	Marcella	Julia Agrippina, Roman noble woman, the fourth wife of the emperor Claudius, and mother of Nero, who effectively ruled the empire through her influence over both her husband and son. Nero, however, came to resent her hold on him, and had her executed.
Aisha	10th century	Spain	Hrosvitha	Spanish poet who presented her work at the Royal Academy of Córdoba, Andalusia.
Ajysyt	Mythical	Siberia	Primordial Goddess	Siberian goddess of birth. A fertility deity of the Turkic Yakut people from the Lena River region of Siberia. The name means "birthgiver" and may also be called the "Mother of Cradles"
Albertine Necker de Saussure	1766	France	Emily Dickinson	Cousin of writer Germaine de Staël, whom she frequently collaborated with and wrote about. Women's rights advocate and supporter of physical education for girls.
Aleksandra Kollantay	1872	Russia	Margaret Sanger	Women's rights activist, and socialist. She fled Russia in 1905 and lived in Germany, advocating women's issues. After the 1917 Revolution she returned to Russia and was elected Commissar of Social Welfare.
Alessandra Giliani	1307	Italy	Isabella d'Este	Fictional scientist, said to have invented a way to draw blood from the veins and arteries of cadavers, then replace the blood with fluid dyes. These dyes allowed the veins to remain marked for students to study. She died suddenly at age 19. She was a medical illustrator and assistant to Mondino de Liuzzi.
Aletta Jacobs	1854	Netherlands	Susan B. Anthony	First woman to graduate from a Dutch university and the first female physician in the Netherlands. She was also a women's rights advocate and translated Charlotte Perkins Gilman's Women and Economics into Dutch, helping spread feminist ideals through the country. After World War I, she created the Women's International League for Peace and Freedom.
Alexandra of Jerusalem	139 BC	Judea	Boadaceia	Took over the throne of Judea after the death of her husband, Alexander Jannaeus, in 76 BC. She was a peacekeeper in the region and led Judea into a prosperous period during her rule. Upon her death in 67 BC, civil war began immediately as her son came to the throne.
Alexandra van Grippenberg	c. 1857	Finland	Susan B. Anthony	Early advocate for temperance and women's rights. Established a branch of the International Council of Women in Finland.
Alfonsina Storni	1892	Argentina	Virginia Woolf	Poet, actress, educator and feminist. She founded the Argentine Society of Writers. She had breast cancer, which moved to her throat. Failed treatments curbed her interest in further treatment, leading her to commit suicide by throwing herself into the sea.
Alice Kyteler	13th Century	Ireland	Petronilla de Meath	Called the Witch of Kilkenny, and was one of the earliest women in Ireland to be accused of witchcraft. All of her husbands died during marriage, leaving her wealthy, and she was accused of murdering them. She was able to escape further accusations of witchcraft due to her aristocratic connections and escaped to England in 1325.
Alice Milliat	1884	France	Elizabeth Blackwell	Founded the Fédération Sportive Féminine Internationale and launched the Women's World Games, also called the Women's Olympics. The WWG led to the Olympic Committee to open up track-and-field events at the 1928 games to women.
Alice Paul	1885	United States	Susan B. Anthony	One of the most important leaders in the American suffragist movement. She wrote the Equal Rights Amendment (which, despite numerous attempts, was never ratified) and founded the National Woman's Party in the United States.
Alice Pike Barney	1857	United States	Natalie Barney	Mother of Natalie Barney, she was an advocate for the arts, an artist, and a philanthropist. She hosted salon evenings, with the who's who of Washington, D.C. society. She gave her home, fully intact, to the Smithsonian Institution, who proceeded to sell it and its contents.
Alice Samuel	16th century	England	Petronilla de Meath	As an elderly woman, she was accused of being a witch by the children of her employer, and of later causing the death of Susan Weeks, Lady Cromwell, through sorcery. Her trial for the latter was held in 1593, and she was hanged, along with her husband and daughter.
Alice Stone Blackwell	1857	United States	Susan B. Anthony	Daughter of Lucy Stone, she edited the Woman's Journal and assisted with the formation of the National American Woman Suffrage Association.
Aliénor de Poitiers	fl. late 15th century	France	Christine de Pisan	Author who wrote Les honneurs de la cour, a book about court ritual and etiquette for all social classes. She was described as the Emily Post of the 15th century.
Alison Rutherford	1712	Scotland	Mary Wollstonecraft	Lyricist, Rutherford moved to Edinburgh in 1753 after becoming a widow and hung out in circles of Scotland's literary elite. She wrote a version of the Scottish folk song Flowers of the Forest.
Almucs de Castelnau	c. 1140	France	Eleanor of Aquitaine	French trobairitz—female troubadour. A single poem of hers survives
Aloara	10th century	Italy	Trotula	After the death of her husband, Pandolf, in 981, she ruled Capua until her death in 992.
Alpis de Cudot	c. 1156	France	Hildegarde of Bingen	Cudot, who suffered from leprosy, had visions incited by her illness. Often religious in nature, one vision led her to believe that the earth was round. As she promoted the concept, people did not believe her. She was canonized in the 19th century.
Althea Gibson	1927	United States	Elizabeth Blackwell	First African American woman to compete in the Wimbledon Championships and the US Open. She went on to play golf, and became the first African American woman to participate in the Ladies Professional Golf Association.
Alukah	Mythical	Canaan	Kali	Succubus or vampire, Alukah may be associated with Lilith.
Amat-Mamu	fl. c. 1750 BC	Babylonia	Ishtar	Priestess and temple scribe in Sippar. Her existence is known from the cuneiform tablets on which she wrote.
Amelia Earhart	1897	United States	Elizabeth Blackwell	Aviator and women's rights activist. She was the first female aviator to fly across the Atlantic Ocean - first accompanied, then solo - and founded the Ninety-Nines, an international organisation for female pilots. She was also a member of the National Woman's Party, and an early supporter of the Equal Rights Amendment.
Amelia Holst	1758	Germany	Susan B. Anthony	The German counterpart of Mary Wollstonecraft, she was an outspoken feminist and educator. She wrote the first book in German arguing for women's educational opportunities.
Amelia Villa	1900	Bolivia	Elizabeth Blackwell	The first female physician from Bolivia.
Amy Beach	1867	United States	Ethel Smyth	American pianist and first female composer in the United States.
Ana Betancourt	1832	Cuba	Sacajawea	She was a mambisa, and was one of the first generation Cuban feminists.
Anaconda	1474	Haiti	Sacajawea	Taino chief, a poet and a songwriter.
Anahita	Mythical	Persia	Ishtar	Virgin goddess of fertility, love and war.
Anaïs Nin	1903	Europe, United States	Virginia Woolf	Author and diarist. One of the first female authors to write erotica.
Anastasia	fl. c. 1400	France	Christine de Pisan	Manuscript illumination artist. Nothing is known about her except for the praise heaped upon her by the medieval writer Christine de Pizan who describes her as the finest illuminator of her day. It's possible, though not confirmed, that she was one of the artists who worked on the manuscript known as The Book of the Queen, which Christine presented to Isabeau of Bavaria.
Anastasia	fl. early 4th century	Rome	Marcella	Arrested and prosecuted in the last wave of Christian persecutions, dying in 304. She was canonized in the 5th century.
Anath	Mythical	Canaan	Ishtar	Goddess of love and warfare who is the sister and, according to a much disputed theory, the lover of the great god Ba‘al Hadad.
Anasandra	fl. 3rd century BC	Greece	Sappho	The daughter and student of Nealkes, a painter of mythological and genre scenes, whose footsteps she followed in.
Andrea Villarreal	1881	Mexico; United States	Sacajawea	Teacher, poet, labor organizer and feminist who co-published La Mujer Moderna (English: The Modern Woman), with her sister Teresa.
Angela Merici	c. 1474	Italy	Christine de Pisan	Founded the Angelines, a lay religious organisation dedicated to the education of girls and the care of the sick and needy. She was canonized in 1807. Some Angelines later branched off to form the Ursuline order of nuns.
Angelberga	9th century	Italy	Trotula	Empress of the Holy Roman Empire, co-ruled with her husband, Louis II of Italy. In 869 became abbess of San Sisto in Piacenza, which she had founded.
Angéle de la Barthe	c. 1230	France	Petronilla de Meath	Noblewoman accused of witchcraft, and confessed under torture. She was convicted and burned alive. The city of Toulouse has no records of her trial and historians question the validity of the story.
Angelica Balabanoff	1878	Ukraine	Margaret Sanger	Russian socialist writer. She moved to Italy and became a leading member of the Italian Socialist Party then moved back to Russia to become active in the Bolshevik Party and worked with Emma Goldman, Lenin and Leon Trotsky.
Angelica Kauffman	1741	Switzerland	Artemisia Gentileschi	Leading portrait painter, who was admitted to the academies of Florence, Bologna, and Rome. In 1768, she co-founded the Royal Academy of Art in London.
Angelina Grimké	1805	United States	Sojourner Truth	Christian women's rights activist and abolitionist. Wrote the first tract in the United States about women's rights, Letters on the Equality of the Sexes and the Condition of Women (1838).
Angelique du Coudray	1712	France	Caroline Herschel	Court midwife to Louis XV of France, who trained around 4,000 poor French women as midwives. Invented the first life-sized obstetrical mannequin for practicing mock births.
Anna Amalia	1723	Prussia	Anna van Schurman	Sister of Frederick the Great and Princess-Abbess of Quedlinburg, the latter position granting her a seat at the Imperial Diet. Was known as a patron, collector, and composer of music, though very few of her own works have survived. Is sometimes confused with her contemporary, Anna Amalia of Saxe-Weimar, who was also a prolific composer.
Ann Lee	1736	United States	Anne Hutchinson	Joined the Shakers and moved to America after being placed in an English prison for a vision which influenced the Shaker belief system about celibacy. She went to jail again in New York for treason after refusing to pledge allegiance. She was called "Mother Ann" and preached in New England. Her work inspired her followers to found the United Society of Believers in Christ's Second Appearing.
Anna Dalassena Comnena	1025	Byzantine	Theodora	Byzantine noblewoman and mother to emperor Alexios I Komnenos. Ruled as empress during her son's absence on military campaigns.
Anna Karsch	1722	Germany	Emily Dickinson	Dubbed "the German Sappho". The daughter of an innkeeper, Karsch received no formal education and had a difficult life, marked by poverty and two abusive marriages. Her natural abilities as a poet, however, stunned her contemporaries.
Anna Comnena	1083	Byzantine	Theodora	Wrote the Alexiad, which recounts the political and military history of the Byzantine empire under her father, Alexios I Komnenos.
Anna Maria Schwagel	1729	Bavaria	Petronilla de Meath	Schwägel or Schwegelin was an alleged Bavarian witch, who was long considered the last person to be executed for witchcraft in Germany. It is now believed that she died in prison, having seemingly been forgotten about.
Anna Manzolini	1714	Italy	Caroline Herschel	Anatomist and anatomical wax modeler. She was elected professor of anatomy at the University of Bologna in 1755.
Anna Pavlova	1881	Russia	Georgia O'Keeffe	Russian ballerina whose delicacy and grace mesmerized audiences and inspired a generation of dancers and choreographers.
Anna Schabanoff	1848	Russia	Elizabeth Blackwell	Pioneering Russian pediatrician and women's rights activist.
Anna Sophia	1532	Denmark	Elizabeth R.	Danish princess who became the electress of Saxony. She was a pioneer in horticulture and agrarian reform.
Annabella Drummond	1350	Scotland	Isabella d'Este	Queen Consort of Scotland as the wife of Robert III. As the Kings health declined, she acted strongly, albeit unsuccessfully, to secure the succession of their son David.
Anne Askew	1520/1521	England	Anna van Schurman	English poet who was condemned as a heretic. She was one of the earliest female poets to compose in the English language and, according to some accounts, the first Englishwoman to demand a divorce.
Anne Bacon	c. 1528	England	Elizabeth R.	Lady and scholar. She made a lasting contribution to English religious literature with her translation from Latin of John Jewel's Apologie of the Anglican Church (1564). She was the mother of Francis Bacon.
Anne Baynard	1672/73	England	Anna van Schurman	British natural philosopher who was held up as model of piety. She made a particular appeal to her own sex to make an effort to educate themselves.
Anne Bonney	1702	Ireland	Natalie Barney	Irish woman who became an infamous pirate, operating in the Caribbean. Her numerous love affairs, adventurous life, and sword fighting skills have inspired several film portrayals.
Anne Bradstreet	c. 1616	British North America	Anne Hutchinson	First poet and first female writer in the British North American colonies to be published. Her first volume of poetry was The Tenth Muse Lately Sprung Up in America, (1650). It was met with a positive reception in both the Old World and the New World.
Anne Clough	1820	England	Emily Dickinson	Pioneer in women's education, who was determined to create public educational opportunities for young women. She opened her first school in the family home in 1841. She later became the principal of Newnham College, Cambridge which opened in 1875 and was one of the first university colleges for women.
Anne Dacier	c. 1651	France	Anna van Schurman	Foremost classical scholar of her day. Her annotated prose editions of the Iliad and the Odyssey made her famous throughout Europe.
Anne Ella Carroll	1815	United States	Sojourner Truth	American politician, pamphleteer and lobbyist who, according to her own account, served as an advisor to Abraham Lincoln.
Anne Halkett	1623	England	Caroline Herschel	Known for her candid autobiographical writings and religious meditations. Lady Halkett's Memoirs, begun in 1677–78, focuses on her pursuit of love.
Anne of Beaujeu	1461	Belgium	Isabella d'Este	Shared the regency of France from 1483 to 1491 during the minority of her brother, Charles VIII. She was one of the most powerful women of the late fifteenth century, and was referred to as "Madame la Grande".
Anna	1204	Bohemia	Hildegarde of Bingen	Anne of Bohemia was married to Henry II, Duke of Silesia, in 1216. She was widowed in 1241, and served as regent of Silesia on behalf of her sons. She was responsible for the founding of several religious institutions, including a nunnery of Poor Clares at Breslau.
Anne of Brittany	1477	France	Isabella d'Este	Duchess of the semi-independent state of Brittany, Anne was forced into two marriages with French kings. As twice queen of France, she introduced learning and erudition to the court. She sponsored the writing, translation, and publication of literary works about women, especially the first French edition of Christine de Pisan's Book of the City of Ladies.
Anne Redfearne	Late 16th century	England	Petronilla de Meath	Hanged in 1612 as one of the Witches of Pendle, the most famous witch trial in English history. She refused to plead guilty, and gave no evidence against her fellow accused.
Annie Jump Cannon	1863	United States	Caroline Herschel	Pioneering woman astronomer. She cataloged over 350,000 stars and discovered 300 variable stars, five novae, and one binary star in her lifetime. She was also dedicated to the cause of women's suffrage. In 1929, the National League of Women Voters listed her as one of the twelve greatest living American women.
Annie Kenney	1879	England	Susan B. Anthony	Militant working class suffragette who held leading positions in the Women's Social and Political Union (WSPU), which campaigned for women's suffrage.
Annie Smith Peck	1850	United States	Susan B. Anthony	A former professor of Latin at Smith College in Massachusetts, she enthusiastically took up mountain climbing in 1894 and became a celebrity for her feats. At the age of sixty-one, she claimed Mount Coropuna in Peru and placed a pennant on the summit that read "Votes for Women."
Annie Wood Besant	1847	England	Susan B. Anthony	Prominent British socialist, women's rights activist, writer, orator and supporter of Irish and Indian self-rule. She later became a leading member of the mystical Theosophical Society and moved to India.
Antigone	Legendary	Greece	Sophia	Tragic character from Greek myth, the daughter of Oedipus. She defied King Creon, who sentenced her to die by being sealed in a cave.
Antiope	Legendary	Greece	Amazon	Amazon warrior queen. She was the sister of the Amazon queen Hippolyte and the daughter of Ares, God of War.
Antonia Brico	1902	Netherlands	Ethel Smyth	First woman to gain international recognition as a conductor of professional symphony orchestras.
Antonia Padoani Bembo	c. 1640	Venice	Ethel Smyth	Composer and singer, she composed numerous serenatas, arias, religious and secular cantatas, and the opera Ercole amante (1707).
Amyte	c. 225	Greece	Sappho	Arcadian poet, admired by her contemporaries and later generations for her charming epigrams and epitaphs.
Aphra Behn	1640	English	Anna van Schurman	One of the first English professional female authors, producing over 19 plays, plus poetry, translations, and novels.
Aphrodite	Mythical	Greece	Ishtar	Goddess of love and beauty. According to legend, she was born from the sea foam near Cyprus. Aphrodite was the wife of Hephaestus, god of smithing, but she had many lovers, most notably Ares and Adonis
Arachne	Legendary	Greece	Sophia	Inventor of woven cloth and net making. Angered Athena, the patron goddess of weaving, by bragging that her skills were greater than the deity's
Aretaphila of Cyrene	c. 50 BC	Cyrene - ancient Greek colony in North Africa	Boadaceia	Cyrenean noble woman who is said to have deposed the tyrant Nicocrates.
Arete of Cyrene	c. 350 BC	Cyrene - ancient Greek colony in North Africa	Aspasia	Ancient Greek philosopher of the Cyrenaic school, said to have written many books and taught natural and moral philosophy at academies of Attica. The Cyrenaics, established by her father, Aristippus, promoted an ethic of pleasure as the supreme good in the world. Passed down the school's precepts to her son, Aristippus the Younger
Ariadne	Mythical	Crete	Snake Goddess	Helped Theseus overthrow Minos and, in some accounts. married him. She was worshipped on the Greek Islands and is mostly associated with mazes and labyrinths.
Arianrhod	Mythical	Wales	Kali	Figure in Welsh mythology, a major character in the collection of prose tales known as the Mabinogion.
Arinitti	Mythical	Anatolia	Ishtar	Main deity, queen of Hatti, Heaven and earth. Also known as Arinna or, more generally, the Sun Goddess of Arinna.
Aristoclea	c. 6th Century BC	Greece	Aspasia	Priestess at Delphi; philosopher; taught Pythagoras his moral doctrines.
Arsinoe II	c. 316 BC	Greece	Boadaceia	Queen of Thrace, Macedonia, and later co-ruler of Egypt with brother. Shared all her brother's titles, won chariot races in the Olympics, had her image printed on coins, and even founded her own cult.
Artemis	Mythical	Greece	Snake Goddess	Goddess of the hunt, watcher of forests, protector of young children.
Artemisia I	c. 480 BC	Greece	Boadaceia	Queen of Halicarnassus, fought for Xerxes I (commanding naval ships) against the Greeks during the Second Persian Invasion of Greece.
Artemisia II	4th Century BC	Greece	Boadaceia	Sister and wife of the famous King Mausolus. She created the Mausoleum at Halicarnassus, considered one of the Seven Wonders of the Ancient World, in memory of her husband.
Asherah	Mythical	Canaan	Ishtar	Goddess of sexuality and procreation, worshipped by Semitic peoples of Syria and Israel. May be an alternate name for Astarte.
Ashtoreth	Mythical	Hebrew	Ishtar	Goddess of fertility and reproduction, worshipped by Semitic peoples of Phoenicia. Believed to be the same being as Astarte.
Aspasia of Athens	c. 5th Century	Greece	Aspasia	Practiced obstetrics and gynecology, and seems to have been the teacher of Aetius, the royal physician to Byzantine emperor Justinian I. Not to be confused with Aspasia of Miletus who has a place setting at the table.
Astarte	Mythical	Phoenicia	Ishtar	Fertility goddess. The Hellenized form of the Middle Eastern goddess Ishtar. She was also worshipped in Egypt.
Atalanta	Legendary	Greece	Sophia	Legendary huntress, warrior and athlete, sworn to perpetual virginity. She was loved by the hero Meleager.
Athaliah	c. 9th Century BC	Jerusalem	Judith	Daughter of Jezebel. Queen regent who seized control of the throne of Judah and fought to establish worship of her god, Baal, instead of Yahweh.
Athanarsa	c. 790	Byzantine Empire	Hrosvitha	Saint known for her miraculous healing of the sick and those seen as possessed. She was, for a while, adviser to the Empress Theodora the Blessed.
Athene	Mythical	Greece	Snake Goddess	Virgin goddess, warrior, and patron of culture. Goddess of wisdom, war, artists, architects, weavers. Protector of Athens.
Atira	Mythical	North America	Primordial Goddess	Goddess of the Earth in Pawnee mythology. Her name means "Vault of the Sky".
Augusta Fickert	1855	Austria	Susan B. Anthony	Austrian feminist and social reformer.
Augusta Savage	1892	United States	Georgia O'Keeffe	Influential African-American Sculptor associated with Harlem Renaissance.
Augusta Schmidt	1833	Germany	Susan B. Anthony	Pioneering German feminist, educator, journalist and women's rights activist.
Augustina Saragossa	1786	Spain	Margaret Sanger	Known as the 'Spanish Joan of Arc'. Fought as an officer in the Peninsular War / Spanish War of Independence.
Awashonks	17th Century	United States	Sacajawea	Sachem (chief) of the Sakonnet tribe in Rhode Island. Historical figure connected to the colonial history of the US.
Axiothea	c. 350 BC	Greece	Aspasia	Along with Lastheneia of Mantinea, one of only two known women to be students of Plato and Speusippus. Said to have studied at the academy while dressed as a man.
Baba Petkova	1826	Bulgaria	Emily Dickinson	Pioneer of women's education. Founded the first girls' schools in Bulgaria when it was under Ottoman rule. Government officials tried to stop her, leading to her arrest and trial. She was released due to lack of evidence and continued her campaign to educate women.
Babe Didrikson	1911	United States	Elizabeth Blackwell	Excelled at multiple sports in the early-to-mid twentieth century. Olympic gold medalist; in the top ten of multiple "Greatest Athlete" lists.
Baptista Malatesta	c. 1384	Italy	Isabella d'Este	Renaissance poet who was a learned woman of the aristocracy, educated in philosophy, languages, poetry and oratory. She corresponded with other scholars of her time, most notably Leonardo Bruni.
Baranamtarra	c. 2500 BC	Sumer	Ishtar	Co-ruler with her husband of the Sumeriam city of Lagash. Surviving records show she conducted business and trade in her own right.
Barbara Bodichon	1827	United Kingdom	Susan B. Anthony	Landscape artist and activist, known for her efforts in women's rights and suffrage campaigns. Co-founded Girton College, Cambridge with Emily Davies.
Barbara Hepworth	1903	United Kingdom	Georgia O'Keeffe	Modernist artist and sculptor from England.
Barbara Strozzi	1619	Italy	Isabella d'Este	Baroque composer and singer.
Barbara Uttman	c. 1514	Germany	Anna van Schurman	Reputedly established the lacemaking industry in her city around 1560.
Barbe de Verrue	13th Century	France	Eleanor of Aquitaine	French Trouvère and singer mentioned in Poésies de Clotilde, a work now recognized as a historical forgery.
Baroness de Beausoleil	c. 1600	France	Caroline Herschel	Pioneering female mining engineer and mineralogist who travelled extensively in Europe in search of mineral deposits.
Basilea	Mythical	Ancient Greece	Boadaceia	According to Diodorus Siculus, the first queen of the Atlantians in the North African folk tradition based on the Greek myths. However, these Atlantians, whom Diodorus states are still living in his day (1st Century BC), inhabit the North African coast, near the Atlas Mountains, from which they get their name. Basilea's story, as recounted by Diodorus, has many similarities to that of Theia, suggesting she may be a localized version.
Basine	c. 438	Thuringia	Saint Bridget	Queen of Thuringia in the middle of the fifth century.
Bathilde	c. 626	Burgundy and Neustria	Theodora	Anglo-Saxon of noble birth, Wife and Queen of Clovis II and then Queen regent to her son Clotaire II. Led a humble life, published a hagiography and was herself canonised. She instituted many reforms relating to the rights of individuals, abolition of the slave trade in France and equal taxation for men and women.
Bathsua Makin	c. 1600	England	Anna van Schurman	Protofeminist, middle-class Englishwoman who contributed to the emerging criticism of woman's position in the domestic and public spheres
Baudonivia	7th Century	France	Hrosvitha	French nun and scholar. Created a memoir of saint and convent founder Radegund.
Beatrice de Die	c. 1175	French	Eleanor of Aquitaine	Trobairitz—a female troubadour (poet-musician) in Provence, France.
Beatrice Webb	1858	English	Margaret Sanger	English socialist, economist and historian. She studied the conditions of the working class in England and wrote numerous books on the root causes of poverty. She co-founded the London School of Economics and Political Science.
Beatrix Galindo	15th Century	Spain	Christine de Pisan	Writer, humanist, and a teacher of Queen Isabella of Castile and her children.
Begga	615	Belgium	Hrosvitha	On the death of her husband, she took the veil, founded seven churches, and built a convent at Andenne on the Meuse River (Andenne sur Meuse) where she spent the rest of her days as abbess. Some hold that the Beguine movement which emerged in the 12th century was actually founded by St Begga 500 years earlier; the church in the beguinage of Lier, Belgium, having a statue of St Begga standing above the inscription: St. Begga, our foundress.
Bel-Shalti-Narrar	c. 540 BC	Babylonia	Hatshepsut	High priestess, responsible for first museum collection.
Belva Lockwood	1830	United States	Elizabeth Blackwell	Activist for women's rights, including suffrage, property rights, and education. One of the first female lawyers in the United States, and the first to be permitted to practice before the Supreme Court. She was also the first woman to appear on a ballot for U.S. president.
Berengaria	c.1165	Navarre	Hildegarde of Bingen	Queen of England alongside Richard the Lionheart, although she herself never visited in Richard's lifetime. Known for her piety and as a benefactor of monasteries.
Berenguela	1179 or 1180	Spain	Eleanor of Aquitaine	Queen of Castile in 1217 and Queen consort of León from 1197 to 1204. She was responsible for the re-unification of Castile and León under her son's authority, and supported his efforts in the Reconquista. She was a patron of religious institutions and supported the writing of a history of the two countries.
Bernarda de la Cerda	1596	Portugal	Anna van Schurman	Portuguese scholar, writer and playwright. Her skill was celebrated in verse by the poets Manuel de Gallegos and Lope de Vega
Bertha Lutz	1894	Brazil	Susan B. Anthony	A Brazilian zoologist, politician, and diplomat. Lutz became a leading figure in both the Pan American feminist movement and human rights movement.
Bertha of England	c. 565	England	Theodora	Queen of Kent whose influence led to the Christianization of Anglo-Saxon England. She was canonized as a saint for her role in its establishment during that period of English history.
Bertha of Sulzbach	1110s	Germany	Trotula	First wife and Empress of Byzantine Emperor Manuel I Comnenus. Due to an error in A History of Women in Medicine, Bertha was included for founding the Monastery of Christ Pantokrator, which included a hospital. However, the monastery was actually founded by Bertha's predecessor, Irene of Hungary.
Bertha von Suttner	9 June 1843	Austria	Emily Dickinson	Czech-Austrian pacifist and novelist. In 1905 she was the first woman to be awarded the Nobel Peace Prize, thus being the second female Nobel laureate after Marie Curie's 1903 award, and the first Austrian laureate.
Bertha of France	Late 8th Century	France	Hrosvitha	Daughter of Charlemagne, who forbade his daughters to marry. She focused on scholarly pursuits, but was banished to a convent when her illegitimate children by an official in her father's court were discovered.
Berthe Morisot	1841	France	Georgia O'Keeffe	Painter and a member of the circle of painters in Paris who became known as the Impressionists. She was described by Gustave Geffroy in 1894 as one of "les trois grandes dames" of Impressionism alongside Marie Bracquemond and Mary Cassatt.
Berthildis	c. 626	France	Hrosvitha	A saint, and the wife and queen of Clovis II, the king of Burgundy and Neustria (639–658). From her donations, the abbeys of Corbie and Chelles were founded: it is likely that others such as Jumièges, Jouarre and Luxeuil were also founded by the queen. She provided support for St. Claudius of Besançon and his abbey in the Jura Mountains.
Bertille	7th Century	France	Hrosvitha	Saint and abbess of Chelles Abbey in France. She was known for her devotion to self-denial.
Bertha	Between 710 and 727	France	Hrosvitha	Frankish queen. She was the wife of Pepin the Short and the mother of Charlemagne, Carloman, and Gisela.
Elizabeth Talbot	16th Century	England	Elizabeth R.	Known as Bess of Harwick, a notable figure of 16th century Elizabethan English society. Through three marriages she accumulated huge wealth and built on a grand scale, notably Hardwick Hall.
Bessie Smith	1894	United States	Sojourner Truth	American blues singer, nicknamed the "Empress of the Blues"
Betsy Kjelsberg	1866	Norway	Elizabeth Blackwell	Norwegian politician for the Liberal Party, being the first female board member of the party, Norway's first female factory inspector from 1910 to 1936, and a member of the feminist movement.
Bettina von Arnim	1785	Germany	Emily Dickinson	Writer, publisher, composer, singer, visual artist, an illustrator, patron of young talent, and a social activist. She was the archetype of the Romantic era's zeitgeist and the crux of many creative relationships of canonical artistic figures.
Bettisia Gozzadini	1209	Italy	Trotula	An Italian lawyer who reputedly flourished around 1250, lecturing in law at the University of Bologna. She reputedly obtained her education disguised as a man, and taught from behind a screen so that she would not distract the students. If true, she was probably the first woman to hold a post at a university.
Blanche of Castile	1188	France	Eleanor of Aquitaine	Queen of France as the wife of Louis VIII. She acted as regent twice during the reign of her son, Louis IX.
Blandina	2nd Century	Italy	Hypatia	Christian martyr during the reign of Emperor Marcus Aurelius.
Blodeuwedd	Mythical	Wales	Ishtar	A woman created from oak, broom, and meadowsweet flowers to be the wife of Lleu Llaw Gyffes. She had an affair with Gronw Pebr and plotted to kill Lleu, for which she was turned into an owl.
Bona-Dea	Mythical	Rome	Fertile Goddess	The "Good Goddess", whose rites and name were known only to initiated women. As such, her exact identity and function, aside from protection of the Roman state, remain a mystery.
Bourgot	14th Century	France	Christine de Pisan	Daughter of French manuscript illuminator Jean Le Noir, active in Paris between 1335 and 1380; she is believed to have assisted with much of Jean's work, including the Psalter of Bonne de Luxembourg.
Bridget Bevan	1698	Wales	Mary Wollstonecraft	Welsh philanthropist and public benefactor.
Birgitta	1303	Sweden	Hildegarde of Bingen	Mystic, saint, and founder of the Bridgettine Order of nuns and monks after the death of her husband of twenty years. Outside of Sweden, she was also known as the Princess of Nericia and was the mother of Catherine of Vadstena.
Bridget Tott	1610	Denmark	Anna van Schurman	Produced the first translations of Roman Classical literature into Danish.
Brigh Brigaid	1st Century	Ireland	Saint Bridget	Celtic brehon (judge). Some of her work was cited as legal precedence for centuries.
Brigid	Mythical	Celtic Ireland	Fertile Goddess	Fertility goddess
Britomartis	Mythical	Crete	Snake Goddess	Cretan goddess of mountains, hunting, and fishing nets. The last is due to a myth where she became entangled in fishing nets after leaping into the sea to escape Minos, who was pursuing her.
Brunhilde	543	Spain, France	Theodora	Visigoth Queen Regent known for both political acumen and ruthlessness.
Beruiah	2nd Century	Palestine	Judith	Mentioned in the Talmud as a sage with extensive knowledge of Jewish rabbinical law.
Brynhild	Mythical	Germanic culture	Boadaceia	Shieldmaiden and a valkyrie in Germanic mythology, where she appears as a main character in the Völsunga saga and some Eddic poems treating the same events. Under the name Brünnhilde she appears in the Nibelungenlied and therefore also in Richard Wagner's opera cycle Der Ring des Nibelungen. She may be inspired by the Visigothic princess Brunhilda of Austrasia.
Buto	Mythical	Egypt	Snake Goddess	Also called Wadjet. The patron and protector of Lower Egypt, and, with her sister Nekhbet, patron deity of a united Egypt.
Caelia Macrina	2nd Century	Italy	Marcella	Known for endowing an alimentary fund for girls, which was more generous to girls than was commonly done at the time.
Cambra	c. 4th Century BC	Britain	Saint Bridget	According to John Lewis's The history of Great-Britain : from the first inhabitants thereof, 'till the death of Cadwalader, last king of the Britains, Cambra was known for teaching noblemen to build cities and castles, herself building the cities Neomag and Noepag, giving laws and judgments, and being a prophet.
Camilla	Legendary	Italy	Sophia	In Virgil's Aeneid, a Volsci warrior who fought against Aeneas's Trojans in Italy. Her death on the battlefield was avenged by Diana, who had her attendant Upis take out Camilla's killer.
Candelaria Figueredo	1852	Cuba	Sacajawea	Cuban patriot who fought in the Cuban struggle for independence from Spain.
Capillana	16th Century	Peru	Sacajawea	Legendary Peruvian ruler who befriended Francisco Pizarro.
Lady Carcas	Legendary	France	Hrosvitha	Legendary Saracen Princess who headed the army of Carcassonne and saved the city by tricking Charlemagne's forces into believing Carcassonne was impregnable. Her order to ring the city's bells in victory is said to have prompted the cry of "Carcas sonne!" ("Carcas rings"), thus giving the city its name.
Cardea	Mythical	Rome	Fertile Goddess	Roman goddess of door hinges, conflated by Ovid with another deity, Carna, whose festival, the Bean-Kalends, was held on the first day of June.
Carlota Matienzo	1881	Puerto Rico	Sacajawea	Puerto Rican feminist and educator. Worked for educational reform and one of the founders of two women's rights organizations.
Carlotta Ferrari	1837	Italy	Ethel Smyth	Italian composer noted for opera.
Carmenta	Mythical	Italy	Sappho	Goddess of childbirth and prophecy, associated with technological innovation as well as the protection of mothers and children, and a patron of midwives. Also said to have invented the Latin alphabet.
Caroline Norton	1808	England	Susan B. Anthony	English poet and social reformer. Caroline left her abusive husband in 1836, following which her husband sued her close friend Lord Melbourne, the then Whig Prime Minister, for criminal conversation. The jury threw out the claim, but Caroline was unable to obtain a divorce and was denied access to her three sons. Caroline's intense campaigning led to the passing of the Custody of Infants Act 1839, the Matrimonial Causes Act 1857 and the Married Women's Property Act 1870. Caroline modelled for the fresco of Justice in the House of Lords by Daniel Maclise, who chose her because she was seen by many as a famous victim of injustice.
Caroline Schlegel	1763	Germany	Mary Wollstonecraft	Noted German intellectual.
Carrie Chapman Catt	1859	America	Susan B. Anthony	American women's suffrage leader who campaigned for the Nineteenth Amendment to the United States Constitution, which gave U.S. women the right to vote in 1920. Catt served as president of the National American Woman Suffrage Association and was the founder of the League of Women Voters and the International Alliance of Women.
Carrie Nation	1846	America	Susan B. Anthony	American woman who was a radical member of the temperance movement, which opposed alcohol before the advent of Prohibition. She is particularly noteworthy for attacking alcohol-serving establishments (most often taverns) with a hatchet.
Cartismandua	1st Century	England	Boadaceia	1st-century queen of the Brigantes, a Celtic people living in what is now northern England. She came to power around the time of the Roman conquest of Britain, and formed a large tribal agglomeration that became loyal to Rome. Our only knowledge of her is through the Roman historian Tacitus, though she appears to have been widely influential in early Roman Britain.
Cassandra Fidelis	c. 1465	Italy	Isabella d'Este	Most renowned woman scholar in Italy during the last decades of the Quattrocento.
Cassandra	Legendary	Troy	Sophia	Rebuffed Apollo's advances, for which she was granted the gift of foresight, but cursed to never be believed.
Caterina Cornaro	1454	Cyprus	Isabella d'Este	The last Queen of Cyprus from 26 August 1474 to 26 February 1489 and declared a "Daughter of Saint Mark" in order that Venice could claim control of Cyprus after the death of her husband, James II ("James the Bastard").
Caterina Sforzia	1463	Milan, Italy	Isabella d'Este	Italian noblewoman, Countess of Forlì and Lady of Imola, firstly with her husband Girolamo Riario, and after his death as a regent of her son Ottaviano.
Caterina van Hemessen	1528	Antwerp, Southern Netherlands	Artemisia Gentileschi	Renaissance painter. She was a member of the Antwerp Guild of St. Luke.
Catharine Fisher	16th Century	Netherlands	Elizabeth R.	Dutch woman who fled to England to escape religious persecution during the 16th Century. According to Venator, Tishem was a remarkably erudite woman, fluent in Latin, Greek, French, Italian, and English. She supervised the education of her son, who became a celebrated classical scholar.
Catherine Beecher	1800	America	Margaret Sanger	American educator known for her forthright opinions on female education, as well as her strong advocacy of the incorporation of kindergarten into children's education.
Catherine de Rambouillet	1588	France	Natalie Barney	Society hostess and a major figure in the literary scene of 17th-century France.
Catherine Deshayes	c. 1640	France	Petronilla de Meath	French fortune teller, poisoner and an alleged sorceress, one of the chief figures in the affaire des poisons during the reign of Louis XIV. She and her associates were suspected of killing between 1,000 and 2.500 infants in Black Masses (though thus may be a later invention), as well as numerous adults through poison commissions.
Catherine Greene	1755	America	Anne Hutchinson	Wife of the American Revolutionary War general Nathanael Greene and mother of five, noted for being a supporter of the inventor Eli Whitney.
Catherine	c. 282	Alexandria, Egypt	Hypatia	According to tradition, a Christian saint and virgin, who was martyred in the early 4th century at the hands of the pagan emperor Maxentius.
Catherine of Aragon	1485	Spain	Elizabeth R.	Queen of England from 1509 until 1533 as the first wife of King Henry VIII; she was previously Princess of Wales as the wife of Prince Arthur.
Catherine Adorni	1447	Italy	Isabella d'Este	Italian Roman Catholic saint and mystic, admired for her work among the sick and the poor and remembered because of various writings describing both these actions and her mystical experiences.
Catherine of Siena	1347	Italy	Hildegarde of Bingen	Tertiary of the Dominican Order and a Scholastic philosopher and theologian. She also worked to bring the papacy of Pope Gregory XI back to Rome from its displacement in Avignon, and to establish peace among the Italian city-states. Since 18 June 1939, she is one of the two patron saints of Italy, together with Francis of Assisi. On 3 October 1970, she was proclaimed a Doctor of the Church by Pope Paul VI.
Catherine Pavlovna	1788	Russia	Elizabeth R.	Daughter of Paul I, emperor of Russia. Her second marriage to Wilhelm I of Württemberg allowed her to create the earliest welfare state in Europe.
Catherine II	1729	Prussia, Germany	Elizabeth R.	Most renowned and longest-serving female ruler of Russia. An example of an enlightened despot, Catherine presided over the age of the Russian Enlightenment, was a correspondent of Voltaire, and an amateur opera librettist.
Celia Fiennes	1662	England	Mary Wollstonecraft	Diarist and travel writer.
Cerridwen	Mythical	Wales	Ishtar	Enchantress in Welsh mythology, reputedly mother to the bard Taliesen.
Caritas Pirckheimer	1466	Germany	Anna van Schurman	Learned woman and abbess who maintained a correspondence with many of the great scholars of her day. Opposed the Reformer's attempts to close her monastery, and succeeded in having it spared until the last of her nuns had died.
Charlotte Brontë	1816	England	Emily Dickinson	Author of the novel Jane Eyre which mirrors Brontë's own struggle for integrity and self-sufficiency.
Charlotte Corday	1768	France	Mary Wollstonecraft	Assassin of French Revolutionary Jean-Paul Marat, whom she considered the mastermind behind the Reign of Terror. At her trial, Corday revealed her idealistic motivation, allegedly proclaiming, "I killed one man to save 100,000."
Charlotte Guest	1812	Britain	Elizabeth Blackwell	English aristocrat who is best known as the first publisher in modern print format of The Mabinogion which is the earliest prose literature of Britain. Guest established The Mabinogion as a source literature of Europe, claiming this recognition among literati in the context of contemporary passions for the Chivalric romance of King Arthur and the Gothic movement.
Charlotte Perkins Gilman	1860	America	Susan B. Anthony	Prominent American feminist, sociologist, novelist, writer of short stories, poetry, and nonfiction, and a lecturer for social reform. She was a utopian feminist during a time when her accomplishments were exceptional for women, and she served as a role model for future generations of feminists because of her unorthodox concepts and lifestyle. Her best remembered work today is her semi-autobiographical short story "The Yellow Wallpaper" which she wrote after a severe bout of postpartum psychosis.
Chicomecoatl	Mythical	Mesoamerica	Snake Goddess	Maize goddess.
Chiomara	3rd Century BC	Turkey	Boadaceia	Galatian noblewoman and the wife of Orgiagon, chieftain of the Tectosagi, one of three Galatian tribes during the Galatian War with Rome, of 189 BC.
Christabel Pankhurst	1880	England	Susan B. Anthony	Suffragette born in Manchester, England. A co-founder of the Women's Social and Political Union (WSPU), she directed its militant actions from exile in France from 1912 to 1913. In 1914 she supported the war against Germany. After the war she moved to the United States, where she worked as an evangelist for the Second Adventist movement.
Christina of Sweden	1626	Sweden	Elizabeth R.	Queen regnant of Sweden for a brief period, but abdicated and went to Italy, where she became involved in music and theater. Scandalized the Swedish court with her androgynous appearance and penchant for cross dressing, though the truth of her sexuality and gender identity is not truly known.
Christina Rossetti	1830	United Kingdom	Emily Dickinson	English poet famous for her long poem Goblin Market.
Circe	Legendary	Greece	Sophia	Appeared in the Odyssey, turned men into swine, lived alone on her island.
Clara Barton	1821	America	Elizabeth Blackwell	Pioneering nurse who founded the American Red Cross. She worked as a hospital nurse in the American Civil War, and as a teacher and patent clerk. Barton is noteworthy for doing humanitarian work at a time when relatively few women worked outside the home.
Clara Hatzerlin	1430	Germany	Christine de Pisan	Professional scribe in 15th century Augsburg.
Clara Schumann	1819	Germany	Ethel Smyth	German musician and composer, considered one of the most distinguished pianists of the Romantic era. She exerted her influence over a 61-year concert career, changing the format and repertoire of the piano recital and the tastes of the listening public. She was the first to perform publicly any work by Brahms.
Clara Zetkin	1857	Germany	Margaret Sanger	German Marxist theorist, activist, and advocate for women's rights. In 1911, she organized the first International Women's Day. Until 1917, she was active in the Social Democratic Party of Germany, then she joined the Independent Social Democratic Party of Germany (USPD) and its far-left wing, the Spartacist League; this later became the Communist Party of Germany (KPD), which she represented in the Reichstag during the Weimar Republic from 1920 to 1933.
Clare of Assisi	1194	Italy	Hildegarde of Bingen	Italian saint and one of the first followers of Saint Francis of Assisi, founded the Order of Poor Ladies as a and equivalent women's order to the Franciscans. Wrote the Rule of Life for the Poor Ladies, the first monastic rule known to have been written by a woman, and spent her entire life fighting to get it accepted, only being granted it on her deathbed. Following her death, the order she founded was renamed in her honor as the Order of Saint Clare, commonly referred to today as the Poor Clares.
Claricia	12th Century	Germany	Hrosvitha	German illuminator who included a self-portrait in a South German psalter c.1200.
Claudine de Tencin	1682	France	Natalie Barney	French salonist and author.
Clémence Royer	1830	France	Elizabeth Blackwell	Self-taught French scholar who lectured and wrote on economics, philosophy, science and feminism. She is best known for her controversial 1862 French translation of Charles Darwin's On the Origin of Species.
Cleobuline	6th Century BC	Greece	Sappho	Ancient Greek poet. She wrote poetry in hexameter verse and was particularly skilled in writing riddles or enigmas. Aristotle quotes her in both his Poetics and the Rhetoric. She was sufficiently well known to be satirized in a play by the comic dramatist Cratinus.
Cleopatra	69 BC	Egypt	Boadaceia	The last active pharaoh of Ptolemaic Egypt.
Clodia	c. 95 BC	Ancient Rome	Hypatia	One of three known daughters of the ancient Roman patrician Appius Claudius Pulcher and either Caecilia Metella Balearica, or her cousin, Caecilia Metella daughter of Lucius Caecilius Metellus Diadematus. Her life, immortalized in the writings of Cicero and also, it is generally believed, in the poems of Catullus, was characterized by perpetual scandal.
Clotilda	475	France	Theodora	Venerated as a saint by the Catholic Church, she was instrumental in her husband Clovis I's famous conversion to Catholicism and, in her later years, was known for her almsgiving and penitential works of mercy.
Clytemnestra	Legendary	Greece	Sophia	Sister of Helen of Troy, she murdered her second husband, who forced her to marry him and had her daughter sacrificed.
Coatlicue	Mythical	Mesoamerica	Kali	Aztec earth goddess
Cobhlair Mor	14th Century	Ireland	Christine de Pisan	Affluent Irish woman and the preserver of Gaelic customs at a time when they were being undermined by Edward III of England.
Colette	1873	France	Virginia Woolf	French novelist and performer. She is best known for her novel Gigi, the basis for the film and Lerner and Loewe stage production of the same title. Colette was nominated for the Nobel Prize in Literature in 1948.
Constance Lytton	1869	Britain	Susan B. Anthony	Influential British suffragette activist, writer, speaker and campaigner for prison reform, votes for women, and birth control. She sometimes used the name Jane Warton.
Constantia	1154	Sicily	Trotula	Heiress of the Norman kings of Sicily and wife of Henry VI, Holy Roman Emperor. She reigned as Queen of Sicily from 1194 to 1198, jointly with her husband until 1197, and then with her infant son, Frederick II, until her death in November 1198.
Corinna of Tanagra	c. 6th Century BC	Greece	Sappho	Ancient Greek poet. According to ancient sources such as Plutarch and Pausanias, she came from Tanagra in Boeotia, where she was a teacher and rival to the better-known Theban poet Pindar. Although two of her poems survive in epitome, most of her work is preserved in papyrus fragments.
Cornelia	c. 73 BC	Ancient Rome	Hypatia	Roman noblewoman and fifth wife of Pompey the Great. She fled with her husband to Egypt after his defeat at Pharsalus, only to witness his murder.
Cornelia	190 BC	Ancient Rome	Hypatia	Second daughter of Scipio Africanus, the hero of the Second Punic War. She is remembered as a prototypical example of a virtuous Roman woman.
Cresilla	5th Century BC	Greece	Sappho	In 1804, Kresilas was mistakenly identified as a woman named "Cresilla" by Matilda Betham, who thought "she" had placed third behind Polykleitos and Phidias in a competition to sculpt seven Amazons for the Temple of Artemis at Ephesus. As a result, Kresilas was mistakenly included in the Heritage Floor.
Cristina Trivulzio	1808	Italy	Natalie Barney	Italian noblewoman who played a prominent part in Italy's struggle for independence. She is also notable as a writer and journalist.
Sibyl of Cumae	6th Century BC	Rome	Sophia	Prophet whose visions were held to predict the fate of Rome.
Cunegund	1234	Hungary	Hildegarde of Bingen	Saint and the wife of Boleslaus V of Poland, with whom she took a vow of chastity after marriage.
Cybele	Mythical	Phrygia	Ishtar	Mountain mother, personification of earth
Cynane	4th Century BC	Macedon	Boadaceia	Half-sister to Alexander the Great, and daughter of Philip II by Audata, an Illyrian princess. Polyaenus writes, "Cynane, the daughter of Philip was famous for her military knowledge: she conducted armies, and in the field charged at the head of them. In an engagement with the Illyrians, she with her own hand slew Caeria their queen; and with great slaughter defeated the Illyrian army."
Cynisca	5th Century BC	Greece	Aspasia	Greek princess of Sparta who became the first woman in history to win at the ancient Olympic Games.
Damo	6th Century BC	Greece	Aspasia	Pythagorean philosopher said by many to have been the daughter of Pythagoras and Theano.
Danielis	fl. 9th century	Greece	Theodora	Widowed Byzantine noblewoman from Patras.
Danu	Mythical	Celtic Ireland	Fertile Goddess	Proposed goddess of whom nothing is known, beyond the name Tuatha Dé Danann ("folk of the goddess Danu") being used for Irish mythology figures such as Brigid and The Morrigan.
Daphne	Legendary	Greece	Sophia	Nymph, hunter
Deborah Sampson	1760	America	Anne Hutchinson	Woman who disguised herself as a man in order to serve in the Continental Army during the American Revolutionary War. She is part of a small number of women with a documented record of military combat experience in that war. She served 17 months in the army, as "Robert Shurtliff" of Uxbridge, Massachusetts, was wounded in 1782 and honorably discharged at West Point, New York in 1783.
Deborah	Ancient times	Israel	Judith	Prophet of the God of the Israelites, the fourth Judge of pre-monarchic Israel, counselor, warrior, and the wife of Lapidoth according to the Book of Judges chapters 4 and 5. The only female judge mentioned in the Bible, Deborah led a successful counterattack against the forces of Jabin king of Canaan and his military commander Sisera; the narrative is recounted in chapter 4. Judges chapter 5 gives the same story in poetic form. This passage, often called The Song of Deborah, may date to as early as the 12th century BC and is perhaps the earliest sample of Hebrew poetry.
Demeter	Mythical	Greece	Snake Goddess	Goddess of agriculture
Dervorguilla	c. 1210	Scotland	Eleanor of Aquitaine	'Lady of substance' in 13th century Scotland, the wife from 1223 of John, 5th Baron de Balliol, and mother of John Balliol, future King of Scots. Was responsible for ensuring the permanent establishment of Balliol College, Oxford, which her husband had founded before his death, allegedly as an act of penance.
Dhuoda	c. 803	France	Hrosvitha	Author of the Liber Manualis, a handbook written for her son.
Dido	c. 850 BC	North Africa	Hatshepsut	Phoenician princess, legendary founder of Carthage
Diemud	c. 1060	Germany	Hrosvitha	Recluse at Wessobrunn Abbey in Upper Bavaria, Germany.
Diotima	5th Century BC	Greece	Aspasia	Philosopher and priestess who plays an important role in Plato's Symposium. Her ideas are the origin of the concept of Platonic love. Since the only source concerning her is Plato, it is uncertain whether she was a real historical personage or merely a fictional creation; however, nearly all of the characters named in Plato's dialogues have been found to correspond to real people living in ancient Athens.
Djuna Barnes	1892	America	Natalie Barney	American journalist, playwright, poet, short-story writer, and visual artist, whose work continues to "beguile, excite and inspire readers". She is best known for her novel Nightwood (1936, England; 1937 United States), which is a masterpiece of high modernism.
Dolores Ibárruri	1895	Spain	Margaret Sanger	Spanish Republican leader of the Spanish Civil War and communist politician of Basque origin.
Dorcas	1st Century	Israel	Marcella	Christian disciple who lived in Joppa, referenced in the Book of Acts (9:36–42) in the New Testament.
Doris Lessing	1919	Britain	Virginia Woolf	British novelist, poet, playwright, librettist, biographer and short story writer.
Dorotea Bucca	1360	Italy	Isabella d'Este	Italian physician. Little is known of her life, except that she reputedly held a chair of medicine and philosophy at the University of Bologna for over forty years from 1390.
Dorothea Dix	1802	Italy	Margaret Sanger	American activist on behalf of the indigent insane, who, through a vigorous program of lobbying state legislatures and the United States Congress, created the first generation of American mental asylums. During the Civil War, she served as Superintendent of Army Nurses.
Dorothea Lange	1895	America	Georgia O'Keeffe	Influential American documentary photographer and photojournalist, best known for her Depression-era work for the Farm Security Administration (FSA). Lange's photographs humanized the consequences of the Great Depression and influenced the development of documentary photography.
Dorothea Leporin-Erxleben	1715	Germany	Caroline Herschel	First licensed female medical doctor in Germany
Dorothea von Rodde	1770	Germany	Elizabeth Blackwell	German scholar and the first woman to receive a doctor of philosophy degree in Germany. She was one of the so-called Universitätsmamsellen, a group of five academically active women during the 18th-and 19th centuries. All daughters of academics at Göttingen University, the others were Meta Forkel-Liebeskind, Therese Huber, Philippine Engelhard, and Caroline Schelling.
Dorothy Arzner	1897	America	Georgia O'Keeffe	American film director whose career in feature films spanned from the silent era of the late 1920s into the early 1940s. She was one of the very few women who established a name for herself as a director in the film industry during this time. Her body of work remains to this day the largest by a woman director within the studio system.
Dorothy Richardson	1873	Britain	Virginia Woolf	British author and journalist. Author of Pilgrimage, a sequence of 13 novels, she was one of the earliest modernist novelists to use stream of consciousness as a narrative technique. Richardson also emphasizes in Pilgrimage the importance and distinct nature of female experiences.
Dorothy Wordsworth	1771	England	Caroline Herschel	English author, poet and diarist. She had no ambitions to be an author, and her writings consist only of a series of letters, diary entries, poems and short stories.
Douceline de Digne	c. 1215	France	Hildegarde of Bingen	Founder of the Beguines of Marseilles and the subject of a vita, The Life of Douceline de Digne, that survives to this day.
Eachtach	Mythical	Ireland	Boadaceia	In one version of a myth, Eachtach begged Fionn to help her father but he refused. To avenge her father's death, Eachtach gathered her brothers into an army and harried Fionn for four years until he was near death from the constant battles. In the end, however, Eachtach did not manage to kill Fionn.
Eadburga	8th Century	England	Hrosvitha	Wife of King Beorhtric of Wessex; according to Asser's Life of Alfred the Great, she accidentally killed her husband by poison. She fled to Francia, where she is said to have been offered the chance of marrying Charlemagne, but ruined the opportunity by stating she'd rather have his son. Instead, she was appointed as the abbess of a convent, a role in which she is said to have fornicated with an English exile. As a result, she was eventually expelled from the monastery and ended her days begging in the streets of Pavia.
Eanswith	c. 614	England	Hrosvitha	Anglo Saxon princess. In 630, Eanswith founded the Benedictine Folkestone Priory, the first nunnery in England.
Ebba	9th Century	Scotland	Hrosvitha	Abbess of Coldingham Priory in south-east Scotland.
Edith Cavell	1865	England	Elizabeth Blackwell	British nurse celebrated for saving the lives of soldiers from both sides without discrimination and in helping some 200 Allied soldiers escape from German-occupied Belgium during the First World War, for which she was arrested and executed.
Edith Evans	1888	England	Georgia O'Keeffe	English actress best known for her work on the stage, but also appeared in films towards the beginning and end of her career.
Edith	c. 1025	England	Eleanor of Aquitaine	English Queen who was also a highly educated, multilingual royal advisor. Was crowned, unlike most queens of her era.
Edith Sitwell	1887	Britain	Virginia Woolf	British poet and critic and the eldest of the three literary Sitwells. Her home was always open to London's poetic circle, to whom she was unfailingly generous and helpful. Sitwell published poetry continuously from 1913, some of it abstract and set to music. With her dramatic style and exotic costumes, sometimes she was labelled a poseur, but consistently, her work was praised for its solid technique and painstaking craftsmanship.
Edith Wharton	1862	America	Virginia Woolf	Pulitzer Prize-winning American novelist, short story writer, and designer.
Edmonia Lewis	c. 1844	America	Sojourner Truth	African American and Native American sculptor who worked for most of her career in Rome. She gained fame and recognition as a sculptor in the international fine arts world. Her work is known for incorporating themes relating to black and American Indian people into Neoclassical style sculpture. By the end of the 19th century, she was the only black woman who had participated in and been recognized to any degree by the American artistic mainstream.
Edna St. Vincent Millay	1892	United States	Virginia Woolf	Pulitzer prize-winning lyrical poet and playwright; feminist activist; bisexual icon
Egee	Legendary	Libya	Amazon	Amazonian leader of women's army. Her story bears many similarities to that of Myrine
Ehyophsta	19th Century	America	Sacajawea	Cheyenne woman who fought in the Battle of Beecher Island in 1868, and also fought the Shoshone that same year, where she counted coup against one enemy and killed another. She fought the Shoshone again in 1869. She was also a member of a secret society composed exclusively of Cheyenne women.
Eileen Gray	1878	Ireland	Georgia O'Keeffe	Irish furniture designer and architect and a pioneer of the Modern Movement in architecture.
Eleanor Roosevelt	1884	America	Margaret Sanger	American politician, diplomat, and activist.
Eleonora Duse	1858	Italy	Georgia O'Keeffe	Italian actress, often known simply as Duse. She was the subject of the 1947 biographical film Eleonora Duse.
Elfrida Andree	1841	Sweden	Ethel Smyth	Swedish organist, composer, and conductor.
Elin Kallio	1859	Finland	Elizabeth Blackwell	Celebrated pioneering Finnish gymnast, considered the founder of the women's gymnastic movement in Finland.
Elisabeth de La Guerre	1665	France	Ethel Smyth	French musician, harpsichordist and composer.
Élisabeth Vigée-Lebrun	1755	France	Artemisia Gentileschi	Prominent French painter and salon hostess.
Elisabetta Gonzaga	1471	Italy	Isabella d'Este	Influential noblewoman of the Italian Renaissance.
Elisabetta Sirani	1638	Italy	Artemisia Gentileschi	Italian Baroque painter and printmaker who died in still-unexplained circumstances at the early age of 27. She was the most famous woman artist in early modern Bologna, and established an academy for other women artists.
Eliška Krásnohorská	1847	Czech Republic	Susan B. Anthony	Czech feminist author.
Eliza Lucas Pinckney	1722	America	Anne Hutchinson	Woman who changed agriculture in colonial South Carolina, where she developed indigo as one of its most important cash crops. Its cultivation and processing as dye produced one-third the total value of the colony's exports before the Revolutionary War. Manager of three plantations, she had a major influence on the colonial economy.
Elizabeth Barrett Browning	1806	England	Emily Dickinson	One of the most prominent English poets of the Victorian era. Her poetry was widely popular in both Britain and the United States during her lifetime.
Elizabeth Bekker	1738	The Netherlands	Emily Dickinson	Dutch writer who, with co-author Agatha Deken, published highly-regarded epistolary novels in the 1780s and 90s.
Elizabeth Cady Stanton	1815	America	Susan B. Anthony	American suffragist, social activist, abolitionist, and leading figure of the early women's rights movement.
Elizabeth Carter	1717	England	Mary Wollstonecraft	English poet, classicist, writer and translator, and a member of the Bluestocking Circle.
Elizabeth Cellier	17th Century	England	Caroline Herschel	Catholic midwife in seventeenth-century England. She stood trial for treason in 1679 for her alleged part in the "Meal-Tub Plot" against the future James II but was acquitted. She later became a pamphleteer and made attempts to advance the field of midwifery.
Elizabeth Cheron	1648	France	Artemisia Gentileschi	17th century poet, musician, artist, and academic.
Elizabeth Danviers	1545/1550	England	Elizabeth R.	English noblewoman.
Elizabeth Druzbacka	1695/1698	Poland	Emily Dickinson	Polish poet.
Elizabeth Farren	c. 1759	England	Artemisia Gentileschi	English actress of the late 18th century.
Elizabeth Fry	1780	England	Margaret Sanger	English prison reformer, social reformer and, as a Quaker, a Christian philanthropist. She has sometimes been referred to as the "angel of prisons". Fry was a major driving force behind new legislation to make the treatment of prisoners more humane, and she was supported in her efforts by the reigning monarch.
Elizabeth Garrett Anderson	1836	England	Elizabeth Blackwell	English physician and feminist, the first Englishwoman to qualify as a physician and surgeon in Britain, the co-founder of the first hospital staffed by women, the first dean of a British medical school, the first female doctor of medicine in France, the first woman in Britain to be elected to a school board and, as Mayor of Aldeburgh, the first female mayor and magistrate in Britain.
Elizabeth Gurley Flynn	1890	America	Margaret Sanger	Labor leader, activist, and feminist who played a leading role in the Industrial Workers of the World (IWW). Flynn was a founding member of the American Civil Liberties Union and a visible proponent of women's rights, birth control, and women's suffrage. She joined the Communist Party USA in 1936 and late in life, in 1961, became its chairwoman. She died during a visit to the Soviet Union, where she was accorded a state funeral.
Elizabeth Hamilton	1756/1758.	Scotland	Mary Wollstonecraft	Scottish essayist, poet, satirist and novelist.
Elizabeth Hoby	1571	England	Elizabeth R.	Lady Margaret Hoby, English noblewoman and diarist. Confused or conflated with her mother-in-law, Elizabeth Russell, due to a less-than-precise description in A History of Women in Medicine.
Jane Weston	1582	England, Czech Republic	Elizabeth R.	English-Czech poet, mostly known for her Neo-Latin poetry. She had the unusual distinction for a woman of the time of having her poetry published under her own name.
Elizabeth Lucar	1510	England	Elizabeth R.	English woman known from an inscription on her tomb, which extols her many talents and graces, particularly in needlework. It was claimed by David Nunes Carvalho that she was the author of Curious Calligraphy (1525), the first English essay on calligraphy. However, while she is referred to by George Ballard as a "curious calligrapher", no explicit contemporary reference to this essay has ever been found.
Elizabeth Montagu	1718	England	Mary Wollstonecraft	British Social reformer and founder of Bluestockings group.
Elizabeth Ney	1833	Germany, America	Georgia O'Keeffe	Celebrated German-born sculptor who spent the first half of her life and career in Europe, producing sculpted works of famous leaders such as Otto von Bismarck, Giuseppe Garibaldi and King George V of Hanover. At age 39, she immigrated to Texas with her husband Edmund Montgomery and became a pioneer in the development of art there. Some of her most famous works during her Texas period included sculptures of Sam Houston and Stephen F. Austin. Her works can be found in the Texas State Capitol, the US Capitol, and the Smithsonian American Art Museum.
Elizabeth	1207	Germany	Hildegarde of Bingen	Princess of the Kingdom of Hungary, Landgravine of Thuringia, Germany, and a greatly venerated Catholic saint who was an early member of the Third Order of St. Francis, by which she is honored as its patroness. Elizabeth was married at the age of 14, and widowed at 20. After her husband's death she sent her children away and regained her dowry, using the money to build a hospital where she herself served the sick. She became a symbol of Christian charity after her death at the age of 24 and was quickly canonized.
Elizabeth of Schönau	1126	Germany	Hildegarde of Bingen	German Benedictine visionary.
Elizabeth Petrovna	1709	Russia	Elizabeth R.	Empress of Russia from 1741 until her death.
Elizabeth Southern	16th Century	England	Petronilla de Meath	One of the accused witches in the trials of the Pendle witches in 1612, which are among the most famous witch trials in English history, and some of the best recorded of the 17th century. She died while awaiting trial.
Elizabeth Stagel	c. 1300	Switzerland	Hrosvitha	Dominican nun and prioress of the Töss Convent.
Elizabeth Vesey	1715	Ireland	Mary Wollstonecraft	Wealthy intellectual connected to the Bluestockings group - a women's social and educational circle.
Ellen Richards	1842	America	Margaret Sanger	Industrial and environmental chemist in the United States during the 19th century.
Elpinice	fl. c. 450 BC	Greece	Aspasia	Noble woman of classical Athens.
Emilia Pardo-Bazán	1851	Spain	Virginia Woolf	Galician (Spanish) novelist, journalist, essayist, critic and scholar from Galicia.
Emilie du Chatelet	1706	France	Caroline Herschel	French mathematician, physicist, and author during the Age of Enlightenment. Her main achievement is considered to be her translation and commentary on Isaac Newton's work Principia Mathematica. The translation, published posthumously in 1759, is still considered the standard French translation.
Emilie Snethlage	1868	Germany and Brazil	Elizabeth Blackwell	German-born Brazilian naturalist and ornithologist who worked on the bird fauna of the Amazon. Snethlage collected in Brazil from 1905 until her death.
Emily Blackwell	1826	England and the United States	Elizabeth Blackwell	Second woman to earn a medical degree at what is now Case Western Reserve University, and the third openly identified woman to earn a medical degree in the United States.
Emily Brontë	1818	England	Emily Dickinson	Author of the novel Wuthering Heights which challenged strict Victorian ideals of the day, including religious hypocrisy, morality, social classes and gender inequality.
Emily Carr	1871	Canada	Georgia O'Keeffe	Canadian artist and writer heavily inspired by the Indigenous peoples of the Pacific Northwest Coast. One of the first painters in Canada to adopt a Modernist and Post-Impressionist painting style.
Emily Faithfull	1835	England	Elizabeth Blackwell	English women's rights activist, and publisher.
Emma Goldman	1869	Russia and the United States	Margaret Sanger	Anarchist known for her political activism, writing, and speeches. She played a pivotal role in the development of anarchist political philosophy in North America and Europe in the first half of the 20th century.
Emma Paterson	1848	England	Margaret Sanger	An English feminist and trade unionist.
Emma Willard	1787	America	Emily Dickinson	American women's rights activist who dedicated her life to education. She worked in several schools and founded the first school for women's higher education, the Troy Female Seminary in Troy, New York. With the success of her school, Willard was able to travel across the country and abroad, to promote education for women. The Troy Female Seminary was renamed the Emma Willard School in 1895 in her honor.
Emmeline Pankhurst	1858	England	Susan B. Anthony	British political activist and leader of the British suffragette movement who helped women win the right to vote.
Emmeline Pethick-Lawrence	1867	England	Susan B. Anthony	British women's rights activist.
Emmy Noether	1882	Germany and the United States	Elizabeth Blackwell	German mathematician known for her contributions to abstract algebra and theoretical physics. She was described by Pavel Alexandrov, Albert Einstein, Jean Dieudonné, Hermann Weyl, and Norbert Wiener as the most important woman in the history of mathematics. As one of the leading mathematicians of her time, she developed the theories of rings, fields, and algebras. In physics, Noether's theorem explains the connection between symmetry and conservation laws.
Enheduanna	c. 2050 BC	Sumer	Ishtar	Sumerian priestess of Inanna. Earliest recorded author. Wrote poetry and hymns.
Ende	10th Century	Spain	Hrosvitha	Manuscript illuminator who worked on the 10th-century codex known as the Gerona Beatus. It contains Beatus of Liébana's Commentary on the Apocalypse, paired with Jerome's commentary on the Book of Daniel. Ende, who is believed to have provided most of the illustrations, signed her name in the codex as Ende pintrix et d[e]i aiutrix, meaning "Ende, woman painter and servant of God."
Engleberga	c. 830	Italy	Theodora	Wife of Louis II, Holy Roman Emperor, she remained the Holy Roman Empress to his death on 12 August 875, although she did not play a role in political life until after the death of his father, Lothair I, in 855.
Epicharis	1st Century	Ancient Rome	Hypatia	An Ancient Roman freedwoman and a member of the Pisonian conspiracy against the emperor Nero
Ereshkigal	Mythical	Sumer	Kali	Goddess of death
Erinna	Flourished between the 7th and 4th centuries BC	Greece	Sappho	Greek poet. Her best-known poem was the Distaff (Greek Ἠλᾰκάτη).
Esther	Biblical, flourished c. 450 BC	Persia	Judith	Eponymous heroine of the Book of Esther.
Etheldreda	About 636	England	Trotula	Æthelthryth, an Anglo-Saxon saint who, in religious contexts, is also known as Etheldreda or Audrey. She was an East Anglian princess, a Fenland and Northumbrian queen and Abbess of Ely.
Ethylwyn	10th century	England	Hrosvitha	A tenth century noblewoman known for her embroidery work and encounter with Saint Dunstan.
Eugenia	3rd century	Ancient Rome	Saint Bridget	An early Christian Roman martyr.
Europa	Mythical	Crete	Snake Goddess	Phoenician princess carried off to Crete by Zeus in the guise of a white bull. They had three sons there; Minos, Rhadamanthus, and Sarpedon. Afterwards, she married Asterion, King of Crete, who raised her sons as his own.
Euryleon	Fl. c. 370 BC	Ancient Greece	Aspasia	A celebrated woman Olympic charioteer. Euryleonis was an athlete from Sparta who won the 2 horse chariot races of the Ancient Olympic Games in 368 BC. She is sometimes referred to a princess, wealthy woman, and horse breeder.
Eurynome	Mythical	Greece	Primordial Goddess	Goddess of all things in Robert Graves' reconstructed Pelasgian creation myth. Does not appear in any primary sources or archaeology.
Eurypyle	Mythical	Near East	Amazon	Amazon ruler; led a military campaign against Babylon.
Eustochium	c. 368	Rome and Palestine	Marcella	A saint and an early Desert Mother.
Eve	Ancient times	Garden of Eden; rest of world	Judith	A figure in the Book of Genesis in the Hebrew Bible. According to the creation myth of the Abrahamic religions, she was the first woman.
Failge	Unknown; died 1451	Ireland	Eleanor of Aquitaine	A fifteenth-century Gaelic Irish noblewoman (d. 1451 in Ireland) who was mainly remembered for her hospitality and piety. She earned the nickname Mairgréag an Einigh ('Margaret of the Hospitality') after hosting two incredible feasts in the year 1433 and went on pilgrimage to Santiago de Compostela in 1445.
Fanny Burney	1752	England	Emily Dickinson	An English novelist, diarist and playwright.
Fanny Mendelssohn	1805	Germany	Ethel Smyth	A German pianist and composer.
Faustina Bordoni	1697	Italy	Ethel Smyth	An Italian mezzo-soprano.
Fede Galizia	1578	Italy	Artemisia Gentileschi	An Italian Renaissance painter, a pioneer of the still life genre.
Federica Montseny	1905	Spain	Margaret Sanger	A Spanish anarchist, intellectual and Minister of Health during the social revolution that occurred in Spain parallel to the Civil War. She is also known as a novelist and essayist.
Fibors	c. 1130	France	Eleanor of Aquitaine	The earliest attestable trobairitz, active during the classical period of medieval Occitan literature at the height of the popularity of the troubadours.
Finola O'Donnel	Unknown; died 1528	Ireland	Hildegarde of Bingen	A 15th-century Irish noblewoman remembered for cofounding the Franciscan Monastery in Donegal.
Flavia Julia Helena	c. 250	Ancient Rome	Marcella	The consort of the Roman emperor Constantius Chlorus and the mother of the emperor Constantine the Great. She is an important figure in the history of Christianity and the world due to her major influence on her son and her own contributions in placing Christianity at the heart of Western Civilization.
Florence Nightingale	1820	England	Elizabeth Blackwell	A celebrated English social reformer and statistician, and the founder of modern nursing. She came to prominence while serving as a manager of nurses trained by her during the Crimean War, where she organized the tending to wounded soldiers.
Fortuna	Mythical	Rome	Snake Goddess	Goddess of fortune and luck.
Frances Brooke	1724	England	Emily Dickinson	An English novelist, essayist, playwright, and translator.
Frances Harper	1825	America	Sojourner Truth	An African-American abolitionist, poet and author. She was also active in other types of social reform and was a member of the Women's Christian Temperance Union, which advocated the federal government taking a role in progressive reform.
Frances Perkins	1880	America	Margaret Sanger	The U.S. Secretary of Labor from 1933 to 1945, the longest serving in that position, and the first woman appointed to the U.S. Cabinet. As a loyal supporter of her friend, Franklin D. Roosevelt, she helped pull the labor movement into the New Deal coalition. She and Interior Secretary Harold L. Ickes were the only original members of the Roosevelt cabinet to remain in office for his entire presidency.
Frances Power Cobbe	1822	Ireland	Susan B. Anthony	An Irish writer, social reformer, anti-vivisection activist, and leading women's suffrage campaigner
Frances Willard	1839	America	Susan B. Anthony	An American educator, temperance reformer, and women's suffragist.
Frances Wright	1795	Scotland, America	Susan B. Anthony	A Scottish-born lecturer, writer, freethinker, feminist, abolitionist, and social reformer, who became a U.S. citizen in 1825. That year, she founded the Nashoba Commune in Tennessee, intending it to be a utopian community that prepared slaves for emancipation. However, due to numerous failings, it only lasted three years. Her Views of Society and Manners in America (1821) brought her the most attention as a critique of the new nation.
Francesca Caccini	1587	Italy	Isabella d'Este	An Italian composer, singer, lutenist, poet, and music teacher of the early Baroque era. She was also known by the nickname "La Cecchina", originally given to her by the Florentines and probably a diminutive of "Francesca". She was the daughter of Giulio Caccini. Her only surviving stage work, La liberazione di Ruggiero, is widely considered the oldest opera by a woman composer.
Francesca of Salerno	Unknown	Italy	Trotula	A physician from Salerno who is recorded as receiving a medical license from Charles, Duke of Calabria in 1321. The decree reads, in part, "Whereas the laws allow women to practice medicine, and whereas, from the viewpoint of good morals, women are best adapted to the treatment of their own sex, we, having received the oath of humility, permit the said Francesca to practice the said art of healing."
Francisca de Lebrija	Unknown	Spain	Christine de Pisan	A reputed 16th-century lecturer at the University of Alcalá de Henares in Spain.
Françoise de Maintenon	1635	France	Mary Wollstonecraft	The second wife of King Louis XIV of France. Her marriage to the king was never officially announced or admitted, though she was very influential at court. She started a school for girls from poorer noble families.
Frau Ava	c. 1060	Germany	Hrosvitha	The first named female writer in any genre in the German language.
Frau Cramer	1656	Germany, The Netherlands	Caroline Herschel	An accomplished Dutch midwife, known for her extensive journal of birthing accounts in the early modern Era.
Fredegund	6th century	France	Theodora	The Queen consort of Chilperic I, the Merovingian Frankish king of Soissons. Was known for her ruthlessness and lifelong feud with Brunhilda of Austrasia.
Frederika Bremer	1801	Sweden	Susan B. Anthony	A Swedish writer and a feminist activist. She had a large influence on the social development in Sweden, especially in feminist issues.
Freya	Mythical	Norway	Fertile Goddess	Goddess of love, marriage, fertility
Frida Kahlo	1907	Mexico	Georgia O'Keeffe	A Mexican painter who is best known for her self-portraits.
Frija	Mythical	Germany	Fertile Goddess	Goddess of marriage, love and home
Gabriela Mistral	1889	Chile	Virginia Woolf	A Chilean poet-diplomat, educator and feminist. She was the first Latin American to receive the Nobel Prize in Literature.
Gabriele Münter	1877	Germany	Georgia O'Keeffe	A German expressionist painter who was at the forefront of the Munich avant-garde in the early 20th century.
Gabrielle Petit	1893	Belgium	Margaret Sanger	A Belgian woman who spied for the British Secret Service during World War I. Executed in 1916, she became a Belgian national heroine after the war's end.
Gaia	Mythical	Greece	Primordial Goddess	Earth mother
Galla Placidia	388	Ancient Rome	Marcella	Daughter of the Roman Emperor Theodosius I, she was the Regent for Emperor Valentinian III from 423 until his majority in 437, and a major force in Roman politics for most of her life. She was consort to Ataulf, King of the Goths from 414 until his death in 415, and briefly Empress consort to Constantius III in 421.
Gaspara Stampa	1523	Italy	Isabella d'Este	An Italian poet. She is considered to have been the greatest woman poet of the Italian Renaissance, and she is regarded by many as the greatest Italian woman poet of any age.
Gebjon	Mythical	Sweden	Primordial Goddess	Fertility goddess
Geillis Duncan	Unknown	Scotland	Petronilla de Meath	Scottish woman accused of witchcraft, whose case sparked off the North Berwick witch trials.
Genevieve d'Arconville	1720	France	Caroline Herschel	A French author and chemist.
Genevieve	c. 419	France	Saint Bridget	The patron saint of Paris in Roman Catholic and Eastern Orthodox tradition. Her prayers reputedly saved Paris from the armies of Attila the Hun.
George Eliot	22 November 1819	England	Emily Dickinson	Author, translator, journalist. Wrote such novels as Middlemarch, Silas Marner, Daniel Deronda, and Adam Bede.
George Sand	1804	France	Emily Dickinson	A French novelist and memoirist.
Georgiana Cavendish	1757	England	Elizabeth R.	The first wife of William Cavendish, 5th Duke of Devonshire, and mother of the 6th Duke of Devonshire. Was known as a socialite, fashion icon, and novelist.
Germaine de Staël	1766	France, Switzerland	Mary Wollstonecraft	An important writer, and one of Napoleon's main opponents.
Gertrude Käsebier	1852	America	Georgia O'Keeffe	One of the most influential American photographers of the early 20th century.
Gertrude of Hackeborn	1232	Germany	Hildegarde of Bingen	The abbess of the Benedictine convent of Helfta, near Eisleben in modern Germany.
Gertrude of Nivelles	c. 621	Belgium	Hrosvitha	A seventh-century abbess who, with her mother Itta, founded the Benedictine monastery of Nivelles in present-day Belgium.
Gertrude Stein	1874	United States, France	Natalie Barney	Celebrated modernist writer, poet, and playwright.
Gertrude Svensen	1656	Sweden	Petronilla de Meath	A 12-year-old shepherd girl whose confession to witchcraft and accusation of her neighbor's maid, Märet Jonsdotter, marked the beginning of the Mora witch trial and, eventually, the wider Swedish witch trials, known as The Great Noise.
Gertrude the Great	1256	Germany	Hildegarde of Bingen	A German Benedictine, mystic, and theologian.
Gisela of Kerzenbroeck	Unknown; died by 1300	Germany	Hrosvitha	A nun in the northern German city of Rulle who probably worked most of her life writing and illustrating manuscripts, as well as being choirmistress.
Gisela	757	France	Hrosvitha	A nun at Chelles Abbey, where she was eventually made abbess.
Giustina Renier Michiel	1755	Italy	Caroline Herschel	An aristocratic woman who helped intellectual and social Venetian life flourish.
Glueckel von Hameln	1646	Germany	Anna van Schurman	A Jewish businesswoman and diarist, whose account of life provides scholars with an intimate picture of German Jewish communal life in the late-17th-early 18th century Jewish ghetto.
Golda Meir	1898	Kiev, Russian Empire, Present-day Ukraine	Margaret Sanger	Fourth Prime Minister of Israel, one of 24 signatories (including two women) of the Israeli Declaration of Independence.
Goody Glover	17th century	Ireland	Petronilla de Meath	The last person to be hanged in Boston as a witch (1688)
Gormlaith	c. 960	Ireland	Hrosvitha	Supposedly the cause of the Battle of Clontarf in 1014 due to encouraging the fighting, although this was only recorded in writing long after her death and thus is probably not true.
Grace O'Malley	c. 1530	Ireland	Elizabeth R.	Ran a shipping and trading business inherited from her father; sometimes considered a pirate.
Gracia Mendesa	1510	Portugal and Syria	Elizabeth R.	One of the wealthiest Jewish women of Renaissance Europe.
Guda	Unknown	Germany	Hrosvitha	A 12th-century nun and illuminator.
Guillemine	13th century	Italy	Petronilla de Meath	A woman who preached that she would be resurrected as the Holy Spirit incarnate, and that this would lead to a new church led by women.
Gunda Beeg	Unknown	Germany	Susan B. Anthony	She was a women's dress reformer who helped found the first German organization for women's dress reform and designed a new uniform blouse for the German telephone and postal service.
Hannah Adams	1755	America	Anne Hutchinson	An author of books on comparative religion and early US history. She was the first woman in the United States who worked professionally as a writer.
Hannah Arendt	1906	Germany, Czechoslovakia, Switzerland, France, and America	Virginia Woolf	A German-born political theorist.
Hannah Crocker	1752	America	Anne Hutchinson	An American essayist and one of the first advocates of women's rights in America.
Hannah Höch	1889	Germany	Georgia O'Keeffe	A German Dada artist.
Hannah More	1745	England	Mary Wollstonecraft	An English religious writer and philanthropist.
Hannah Senesh	1921	Hungary, Mandatory Palestine, Yugoslavia	Margaret Sanger	Parachuted into Yugoslavia to rescue Hungarian Jews from the Nazis, but was captured and executed.
Hannah Woolley	1622	England	Anna van Schurman	An English writer who published early books on household management
Hannahanna	Mythical	Hittite Empire	Ishtar	"Grandmother" major deity
Harlind	8th century	Belgium	Hrosvitha	Saint and Benedictine abbess, created illuminated manuscript of the Christian Gospels with her sister Relindis of Maaseik.
Reinhild	8th century	Belgium	Hrosvitha	Saint and Benedictine abbess, created illuminated manuscript of the Christian Gospels with her sister Herlindis of Maaseik.
Harriet Beecher Stowe	1811	America	Sojourner Truth	American abolitionist, author of Uncle Tom's Cabin.
Harriet Hosmer	1830	America, Italy	Georgia O'Keeffe	An American sculptor.
Harriet Martineau	1802	England	Emily Dickinson	An English social theorist and Whig writer, often cited as the first female sociologist.
Harriet Tubman	1822	America	Sojourner Truth	An escaped slave who rescued about seventy others from slavery via the Underground Railroad, and later worked for women's suffrage.
Hartense Lepaute	1723–1788	France	Caroline Herschel	Mathematician and astronomer.
Hashop	c. 2420 BC	Egypt	Hatshepsut	Another name for "Hatshepsut", Egypt's most famous woman pharaoh.
Hasta Hansteen	1824	Norway	Susan B. Anthony	A Norwegian painter, writer, and early feminist.
Hathor	Mythical	Egypt	Ishtar	Consort or mother (depending on the myth) of the sun god Ra and/or Horus, the god of kingship.
Hawisa	Unknown; died 1214	England	Eleanor of Aquitaine	The daughter and heiress of William, Count of Aumale and Cicely, daughter and co-heiress of William fitz Duncan.
Hecate	Mythical	Greece	Kali	Goddess of the moon and underworld.
Hecuba	Legendary	Greece	Sophia	Queen of Troy in the Iliad.
Hedwig Nordenflycht	1718	Sweden	Emily Dickinson	A Swedish poet, feminist and salon hostess.
Hedwig	1174	Germany	Hildegarde of Bingen	A saint, who served as Duchess of Silesia from 1201 and of Greater Poland from 1231, in addition to High Duchess consort of Poland from 1232 until 1238.
Hel	Mythical	Norway	Kali	Goddess of the underworld
Helen Cornaro	1646	Italy	Anna van Schurman	The first confirmed woman to receive a doctoral degree from a university, in her case from the University of Padua.
Helen Diner	1874	Austria	Virginia Woolf	An Austrian feminist historian, intellectual, travel journalist, and writer. She wrote, among other things, Mothers and Amazons (1930), which was the first book to focus on women's cultural history.
Helen Keller	1880	America	Margaret Sanger	An American author, lecturer, and political activist, as well as the first deafblind person to earn a bachelor of arts degree.
Helen of Troy	Legendary	Greece	Sophia	Husband's attempts to lure her back started Trojan War.
Helena	Unknown; active during the 4th century BC in Egypt	Egypt	Sappho	A painter, whose work was possibly (but not certainly) the original template for the Alexander Mosaic in Pompeii.
Helena Blavatsky	1831	Russia	Anne Hutchinson	Leading figure in the New Age movement, co-founded the Theosophical Society.
Helene Kottauer	Unknown	Hungary	Elizabeth R.	A handmaiden to Queen Elisabeth of Hungary, who dictated her own life story in German, and helped Queen Elisabeth in a successful royal succession plot.
Héloïse	c. 1090	France	Hildegarde of Bingen	An abbess, nun, scholar, and writer, best known for her love affair and correspondence with Peter Abélard.
Henrietta Johnston	c. 1674	America, unknown origin before that	Anne Hutchinson	The earliest recorded female artist, and the first known pastelist, working in the English colonies
Henrietta Szold	1860	United States	Margaret Sanger	Jewish Zionist leader and founder of Hadassah
Hera	Mythical	Greece	Fertile Goddess	Chief feminine deity, married to Zeus
Hermine Veres	1815–1895	Hungary	Emily Dickinson	Educator and feminist, founded the first secondary school for girls in Hungary
Herrad of Landsberg	c. 1130	France	Hildegarde of Bingen	An Alsatian nun and abbess of Hohenburg Abbey in the Vosges mountains, known for being the author of the pictorial encyclopedia Hortus deliciarum (The Garden of Delights).
Hersend	Fl. 1249–1259	France	Hildegarde of Bingen	A French female surgeon who went on the Seventh Crusade with King Louis IX of France in 1249.
Hersilia	c. 800 BC	Rome	Sophia	Hero of the Rape of the Sabine Women, who stopped the Romans and Sabines from killing each other over the women's abduction.
Hester Stanhope	1776	Britain	Mary Wollstonecraft	A British adventurer, socialite, and traveler. In 1815 she did the first modern excavation in the history of Holy Land archeology.
Hestiaea	Unknown	Alexandria Troas, Asia Minor	Hypatia	Greek grammarian and Homeric scholar, influenced Strabo's Homeric scholarship
Hiera	Mythical	Asia Minor	Amazon	Leader of an army of Mysian women who fought in Trojan War
Hilda of Whitby	c. 614	England	Hrosvitha	Saint and founding abbess of the monastery at Whitby.
Hipparchia	Flourished c. 325 BC	Ancient Greece	Aspasia	A Cynic philosopher, known for public acts of shamelessness (as per Cynic doctrine).
Hippo	Unknown	Ancient Greece	Aspasia	A Greek woman mentioned by the author Valerius Maximus as an example of chastity, and included among the Famous Women written about by Giovanni Boccaccio in the 14th century. It is said that she was abducted by an enemy fleet and threw herself overboard to her death rather than be raped by her captors.
Hippolyte	13th century BC	Scythia	Amazon	Co-ruler with sisters of Amazon capital of Themiscyra.
Honorata Rodiana	1403	Italy	Artemisia Gentileschi	A "semi-legendary" Italian painter and condottiera.
Hortensia	Unknown	Ancient Rome	Hypatia	An orator, best known for giving a speech in 42 BC in front of the members of the Second Triumvirate that resulted in the partial repeal of a tax on wealthy Roman women.
Hortensia von Moos	1659	Switzerland	Anna van Schurman	Swiss scholar who had extensive knowledge of many subjects, including theology and medicine. Known for her writings on the status of women, and is regarded as a precursor by the Swiss women's movement.
Huldah	Unknown	Ancient Israel	Judith	A prophet mentioned briefly in the Bible in 2 Kings 22, and 2 Chronicles 34.
Hygeburg	Flourished 780	Germany	Hrosvitha	An Anglo-Saxon nun at the Abbey of Heidenheim in Germany, who wrote a life of Willibald, and a life of Willibald's brother Wynnebald.
Ida B. Wells	1862	America	Sojourner Truth	A leader in the civil rights movement, who documented lynching in the United States, showing that it was not caused by black criminality but rather by whites wishing to control and punish blacks. She also established women's organizations.
Ida Kaminska	1899	Russian Empire	Georgia O'Keeffe	A Polish-Jewish actress.
Ida Pfeiffer	1797	Austria	Mary Wollstonecraft	An Austrian travel book author and traveler.
Ilmatar	Mythical	Finland	Primordial Goddess	Virgin daughter of air
Iltani	c. 1685 BC	Babylonia	Ishtar	Wealthy priestess
Ima Shalom	Unknown	Ancient Rome	Hypatia	One of the few women who are named and quoted in the Talmud.
Imogen Cunningham	1883	America	Georgia O'Keeffe	An American photographer.
Inanna	Mythical	Sumer	Ishtar	Queen of heaven; the original Sumerian name for Ishtar.
Inessa Armand	1874	France and Russia	Margaret Sanger	A communist politician.
Ingrida	Unknown	Sweden	Christine de Pisan	A fictional Swedish nun, famous for a series of forged letters professing her love for a knight named Axel Nilsson.
Irène Joliot-Curie	1897	France	Elizabeth Blackwell	A scientist who was given the 1935 Nobel Prize for Chemistry, along with her husband, for their discovery of artificial radioactivity.
Irene	c. 752	Byzantine Empire	Theodora	Byzantine empress regnant from 797 to 802, previously empress consort from 775 to 780, and empress dowager and regent from 780 to 797.
Irkalla	Mythical	Babylonia	Kali	Babylonian goddess of the underworld
Isabel de Guevara	Flourished 1530	Spain, Argentina	Sacajawea	One of the few European women to accept the offer from the Spanish crown to join colonizing missions during the first wave of Spanish conquest and settlement of the New World.
Isabel of France	1224	France	Hildegarde of Bingen	Considered a saint by the Franciscan Order, she founded the Poor Clare Monastery of Longchamp.
Isabel Pinochet	1845	Chile	Sacajawea	She led the reform of girls' education in Chile.
Isabela Czartoryska	1746	Poland	Anna van Schurman	A Polish aristocrat, art collector, and writer. She also founded Poland's first museum, the Czartoryski Museum in Kraków.
Isabella Andreini	1562	Italy	Isabella d'Este	An Italian actress and writer; her character, the Isabella role of the commedia dell'arte, was named after her.
Isabella Bird Bishop	1831	England	Mary Wollstonecraft	An explorer, naturalist, photographer, and writer. She co-founded the John Bishop Memorial hospital with Fanny Jane Butler, and she was the first woman to be elected Fellow of the Royal Geographical Society.
Isabella Cortese	Flourished 1561	Italy	Isabella d'Este	An Italian alchemist and writer of the Renaissance.
Isabella de Forz	1237	England	Eleanor of Aquitaine	One of the richest women in England. A weir on the River Exe is named after her, and she is the subject of at least two legends.
Isabella de Joya Roseres	c. 1508	Spain	Elizabeth R.	A humanist, Latinist, philosopher, and specialist on the theology of Dun Scotus.
Isabella Losa	1491	Spain	Elizabeth R.	A doctor of theology. Founded a hospital at Loreto in Italy
Isabella I of Castile	1451	Spain	Elizabeth R.	Queen of Castile and León. United the Spanish kingdoms though her marriage with Ferdinand II of Aragon and capturing the city of Granada, concluding the Reconquista of Muslim Spain. Set up universities open to women and sponsored Christopher Columbus on his voyages of discovery.
Isabella of Lorraine	1400	Lorraine	Isabella d'Este	Suo jure Duchess of Lorraine from 1431 to 1453; also Queen consort of Naples from 1435 to 1442, and the titular queen consort from 1442 until her death.
Isadora Duncan	1877	America, Soviet Union, Western Europe	Georgia O'Keeffe	A pioneer of the interpretative movement in modern dance and an important figure in the arts and dance history. Known as the "Mother of Modern Dance".
Isak Dinesen	1885	Kenya, Denmark	Virginia Woolf	A Danish author, best known for Out of Africa and Babette's Feast.
Isis	Mythical	Egypt	Ishtar	Mother of Heaven/Queen of all Gods. One of the most important goddesses of ancient Egypt. Her cult subsequently spread throughout the Roman Empire
Isotta Nogarola	1418	Italy	Christine de Pisan	An Italian intellectual and writer. A humanist who wrote Latin poems, orations, dialogues, letters. Renowned for her scholarship and eloquence.
Jacobe Felicie	Flourished 1322	Italy, France	Petronilla de Meath	An Italian physician active in Paris, France.
Jadwiga	1373/1374	Poland	Elizabeth R.	The first female monarch of the Kingdom of Poland, reigning from 1384 to her death in 1399.
Jane Addams	1860	America	Margaret Sanger	The first American woman to be awarded the Nobel Peace Prize, she is recognized as the founder of the social work profession in the United States.
Jane Anger	Unknown	England	Christine de Pisan	The first woman to publish a full-length defense of women in English, which was called Jane Anger Her Protection For Women, and published in 1589.
Jane Austen	1775	England	Emily Dickinson	One of the most widely read writers in English literature.
Jane Harrison	1850	Britain	Elizabeth Blackwell	One of the founders of modern studies in Greek mythology.
Jane of Sutherland	1546	Scotland	Elizabeth R.	A wealthy Scottish noblewoman who became the Countess of Sutherland due to her second marriage.
Jane Weir	Unknown	Scotland	Petronilla de Meath	A Scottish woman who, along with her brother, Thomas Weir, voluntarily confessed to incest and witchcraft in 1670, for which they were executed.
Jeanne Campan	1752	France	Mary Wollstonecraft	An educator, writer, and lady-in-waiting.
Jeanne d'Albret	1528	Navarre	Elizabeth R.	The queen regnant of Navarre from 1555 to 1572. She was also the political and spiritual leader of the French Huguenot movement, and was important in the French Wars of Religion.
Jeanne de Montfort	c. 1295	Brittany	Isabella d'Este	Consort Duchess of Brittany, who successfully defended the rights of her husband and son to the dukedom.
Jeanne de Pompadour	1721	France	Mary Wollstonecraft	A member of the French court who was the official chief mistress of Louis XV from 1745 to her death in 1764.
Jeanne Dumée	1660	France	Caroline Herschel	Astronomer and author.
Jeanne Louise Farrenc	1804	France	Ethel Smyth	A composer, teacher, and virtuosa pianist.
Jeanne Mance	1606	France, New France	Caroline Herschel	Nurse and settler of New France. She was one of the founders of Montreal and in 1645 founded Montreal's first hospital, the Hôtel-Dieu de Montréal.
Jeanne Manon Roland	1754	France	Mary Wollstonecraft	Supporter of the French Revolution and important member of the Girondist faction.
Jeanne Marie Guyon	1648	France	Anna van Schurman	A French mystic.
Jeanne Recamier	1777	France	Natalie Barney	A society leader who hosted a salon.
Jeannette Rankin	1880	America	Margaret Sanger	The first woman elected to the U.S. Congress.
Jenny Lind	1820	Sweden	Ethel Smyth	An opera singer.
Jezebel	Fl. 9th century BC	Ancient Israel	Judith	According to the Bible, she convinced her husband King Ahab to encourage the worship of gods other than Yahweh, and herself persecuted Yahweh's prophets, as well as making up false evidence against a person who refused to sell property to her husband. She was killed by her own court retinue.
Jeanne of Navarre	1273	France and Navarre	Eleanor of Aquitaine	She reigned as queen regnant of Navarre and also served as queen consort to Philip IV of France.
Joan of Arc	c. 1412	France	Petronilla de Meath	A saint who helped lead France to victory in the Hundred Years' War.
Joanna Baillie	1762	Scotland	Emily Dickinson	A poet and dramatist.
Joanna Koerton	1650	The Netherlands	Artemisia Gentileschi	An artist famous as a silhouette cutter.
Joanna	Unknown	Germany	Hrosvitha	The prioress of the monastery of Lothen in Germany, best remembered for her tapestry work.
Josefa Amar	1749	Spain	Mary Wollstonecraft	A writer who belonged to a group that were worried about the decadence of conditions of Spain and wanted to correct it by education.
Josefa Ortiz de Domínguez	1773	New Spain, Mexico	Sacajawea	An insurgent and supporter of the Mexican War of Independence.
Josephine Baker	1906	United States, France	Sojourner Truth	American/French actress and performer. First African-American woman to star in a major motion picture. Contributed to the Civil Rights Movement in the US and refused to perform before segregated audiences. Also helped the French resistance in WW2, receiving the medal Croix de Guerre and was made a Chevalier de la Légion d'honneur for her service.
Josephine Kablick	1787	Czechoslovakia	Caroline Herschel	A pioneering botanist and paleontologist.
Jovita Idar	1885	America	Sacajawea	An American journalist and activist for Mexican-American rights.
Judith Leyster	1609	Haarlem, Northern Netherlands	Artemisia Gentileschi	Dutch Golden Age painter. She was a member of the Haarlem Guild of St. Luke.
Judith Murray	1751	America	Anne Hutchinson	An early American advocate for women's rights, as well as an essayist, letter writer, playwright, and poet.
Julia Domma	AD 170	Ancient Rome	Marcella	A Roman Empress famous for her great learning and political influence.
Julia Maesa	c. AD 165	Ancient Rome	Marcella	Grandmother of the Roman emperors Elagabalus and Alexander Severus, she was important in the ascension of each to the title of Emperor at the age of fourteen.
Julia Mamaea	Unknown	Emesene Kingdom	Marcella	A princess from the Syrian Roman Client Emesene Kingdom.
Julia Margaret Cameron	1815	India, Britain	Georgia O'Keeffe	A photographer who became famous for her portraits of celebrities, as well as photographs with legendary or heroic themes.
Julia Morgan	1872	America	Georgia O'Keeffe	An architect, best known for her work on Hearst Castle in San Simeon, California.
Juliana Bernes	1388	England	Christine de Pisan	A writer on hawking, heraldry, and hunting, who is said to have been prioress of the Priory of St. Mary of Sopwell.
Juliana of Norwich	c. 1342	England	Hildegarde of Bingen	An anchoress who is considered an important Christian mystic.
Julie de Lespinasse	1732	France	Natalie Barney	She owned a prominent salon in France.
Juno	Mythical	Rome	Fertile Goddess	Moon goddess, the protector and special counselor of the state.
Justina Dietrich	1636	Germany	Caroline Herschel	A renowned German midwife.
Jutta	1091	Germany	Hildegarde of Bingen	An anchoress.
Kaahumanu	1768	Hawaii	Sacajawea	Queen Regent of Hawaii, champion of Hawaiian women's rights, powerful political figure.
Kallirhoe Parren	1861	Greece	Susan B. Anthony	A journalist and writer who launched the feminist movement in Greece.
Karen Horney	1885	Germany	Virginia Woolf	Psychoanalyst who questioned Freudian theories, credited with founding feminist psychology in response to Freud's theory of penis envy.
Karoline Pichler	1793	Austria	Mary Wollstonecraft	Novelist most famous for historical romance.
Kate Campbell Hurd-Mead	1867	Canada, America	Elizabeth Blackwell	An obstetrician who encouraged women in medicine.
Katharine Hepburn	1907	America	Georgia O'Keeffe	An actress.
Käthe Kollwitz	1867	Germany	Georgia O'Keeffe	A painter, printmaker, and sculptor.
Käthe Schirmacher	1865	Germany	Susan B. Anthony	A German activist for the rights of women.
Katherine Bethlen	1700	Hungary	Caroline Herschel	One of the earliest writers of memoirs in Hungary.
Katherine Sheppard	1847	England, New Zealand	Susan B. Anthony	New Zealand's most famous suffragette.
Katti Moeler	1868	Norway	Margaret Sanger	A children's rights advocate and feminist, best known today as the "advocate of mothers."
Kenau Hasselaer	1526	The Netherlands	Elizabeth R.	A folk hero due to her fearless defense of Haarlem against the Spanish invaders during its siege in 1573.
Khuwyt	c. 1950 BC	Egypt	Hatshepsut	One of the first female musicians recorded in history.
Kora	Fl. c. 650 BC	Sicyon, ancient Greece	Sappho	Credited, along with her father, with the invention of modeling in relief in the seventh century BC.
Kubaba	c. 2573 BC	Sumer	Ishtar	Former innkeeper and beer seller, came to throne, founded 3rd dynasty, queen.
Eleanor Butler	1739	Ireland, Wales	Natalie Barney	One of two upper-class women whose relationship fascinated and scandalized many.
Sarah Ponsonby	1755	Ireland, Wales	Natalie Barney	One of two upper-class women whose relationship fascinated and scandalized many.
Lady Beatrix	Unknown	England	Eleanor of Aquitaine	A noble lady of house de Vesci.
Lady Godiva	Flourished 1040	England	Eleanor of Aquitaine	A noblewoman who according to legend rode naked (covered only by her own long hair) in order to convince her husband to end a tax on his tenants.
Margaret Beaufort	1443	England	Christine de Pisan	An important person in the Wars of the Roses, who also endowed Christ's and St John's Colleges at Cambridge.
Lady Uallach	Unknown; died 934	Ireland	Hrosvitha	An Irish poet and Chief Ollam of Ireland.
Lalla	1st Century BC	Ancient Rome	Sappho	Real name Iaia of Cyzicus, a Greek painter and sculptor who excelled in portraits of women.
La Malinche	c. 1496 or c. 1501	Mexico	Sacajawea	She acted as an advisor, intermediary, interpreter, and lover for Hernán Cortés.
Lamia	Flourished 300 BC	Ancient Greece	Aspasia	A famous courtesan, and mistress of Demetrius Poliorcetes.
Lampedo	Legendary, 13th century BC	Greece	Amazon	Amazon queen mentioned in Roman historiography, co-ruled with sister Marpesia. The two were said to be the daughters of Mars.
Las Huelgas	12th Century	Spain	Hildegarde of Bingen	Misinterpretation of a line in Kate Campbell Hurd-Mead's History of Women in Medicine, where an unnamed abbess of Las Huelgas - possibly Sancha Garcia, given the timeframe and description - is stated to have "ably combined the duties of priest and physician."
Laura Bassi	1711	Italy	Anna van Schurman	The first woman to earn a university chair in a scientific field of studies; specifically, she was appointed to the chair in experimental physics by the Bologna Institute of Sciences.
Laura Battiferri Ammanati	1523	Italy	Isabella d'Este	A poet.
Laura Cereta	1469	Italy	Isabella d'Este	One of the great female humanist and feminist writers of her time and place, and the first to put women's issues and her friendships with women at the center of her writing.
Laura Torres	Unknown	Mexico	Sacajawea	A journalist and founder of an early feminist organization, Admiradoras de Juárez.
Lavinia Fontana	1552	Italy	Artemisia Gentileschi	Italian painter. Considered first female artist outside a court or convent.
Laya	1st Century BC	Ancient Rome	Hypatia	Another name for the painter and sculptor Iaia of Cyzicus.
Leah	Unknown	Ancient Israel	Judith	According to the Bible, one of two wives of Jacob and mother of six sons whose descendants became some of the Twelve Tribes of Israel.
Leonor d'Almeida	1750	Portugal	Mary Wollstonecraft	A noblewoman, painter, and poet.
Leela of Granada	13th Century	Spain	Hrosvitha	A woman from Moorish Spain, said to be renowned for her great learning.
Leonora Baroni	1611	Italy	Artemisia Gentileschi	A composer, lutenist, singer, theorbist, and viol player.
Leontium	Fl.. 300 BC	Ancient Greece	Aspasia	An Epicurean philosopher.
Leoparda	Late 4th–early 5th century	Rome	Theodora	Physician
Levina Teerling	1510–1520	Belgium and England	Artemisia Gentileschi	A Flemish Renaissance miniaturist who served as a painter to the English court.
Liadain	Flourished in the 7th century AD	Ireland	Hrosvitha	A poet.
Libana	10th Century	Spain	Hrosvitha	Andalusian poet and intellectual who lived under Caliph Al-Hakam II.
Lili Boulanger	1893	France	Ethel Smyth	A composer.
Lilith	Mythical	Garden of Eden	Judith	Adam's first wife before Eve, in Jewish folklore. As written by Rabbi Isaac ben Jacob ha-Cohen, Lilith left Adam after she refused to become subservient to him and then would not return to the Garden of Eden after she slept with the archangel Samael.
Lilliard	Legendary	England and Scotland	Elizabeth R.	Lilliard is said to have fought at the Battle of Ancrum Moor following the death of her lover.
Lioba	c. 710	England, Germany	Hrosvitha	A saint who was part of Boniface's mission to the Germans.
Livia Drusilla	58 BC	Ancient Rome	Marcella	The adviser and wife of the Roman emperor Augustus. She was deified by Claudius.
Loretta	c. 1185	England	Hildegarde of Bingen	Countess of Leicester
Lorraine Hansberry	1930	America	Virginia Woolf	Playwright and writer.
Lou Andreas-Salomé	1861	Germany, Italy and Russia	Natalie Barney	Author and psychoanalyst.
Louise Labé	c. 1520 or 1522	France	Natalie Barney	A poet.
Louise Le Gras	1591	France	Caroline Herschel	A saint and the co-founder of the Daughters of Charity.
Louise Michel	1830	France	Margaret Sanger	An anarchist, medical worker, and school teacher.
Louise Nevelson	1899	Russia and the United States	Georgia O'Keeffe	A sculptor.
Louyse Bourgeois	1563	France	Caroline Herschel	Midwife to King Henry IV of France and his wife Marie de Médicis.
Lucretia Marinelli	1571	Italy	Anna van Schurman	A writer best known for The Nobility and Excellence of Women and the Defects and Vices of Men.
Lucretia Mott	1793	America	Susan B. Anthony	A women's rights activist and social reformer.
Lucretia	c. 600 BC	Etruria	Hatshepsut	Killed herself after being raped due to fear of being accused as an adulteress.
Lucrezia Borgia	1480	Italy	Isabella d'Este	The daughter of Pope Alexander VI and Vannozza dei Cattanei; her family arranged several marriages for her to enhance their political standing.
Lucrezia Tornabuoni	1427	Italy	Isabella d'Este	A writer and important political adviser.
Lucy Stone	1818	America	Susan B. Anthony	An important abolitionist, orator, and women's rights activist.
Luisa de Carvajal	1566	Spain	Anna van Schurman	A noblewoman and religious poet and writer.
Luisa Moreno	1907	Guatemala and the United States	Sacajawea	A leader in the United States labor movement; in 1939 she convened the first American national Latino civil rights assembly, Congreso de Pueblos de Habla Española.
Luisa Roldan	1652	Spain	Artemisia Gentileschi	The first woman sculptor documented in Spain.
Luise Gottsched	1713	Germany	Anna van Schurman	One of the founders of modern German theatrical comedy, as well as an essayist, playwright, poet, and translator.
Luise Otto-Peter	1819	Germany	Susan B. Anthony	The founder of the organized German women's movement.
Luiza Todi	1753	Portugal and Russia	Artemisia Gentileschi	A mezzo-soprano opera singer.
Lydia	Unknown	Ancient Rome	Marcella	A woman mentioned in the New Testament who is considered the first documented convert to Christianity in Europe.
Lysistrata	Legendary	Greece	Sophia	Heroine of the play Lysistrata.
Maacah	Ancient times	Ancient Israel	Judith	According to the Bible, the daughter of King David's son Absalom, Maacah was a queen and the mother or grandmother of King Asa. Asa removed Maacah from her royal position because she built an obscene memorial to the goddess Asherah.
Mabel	Unknown	England	Hrosvitha	An embroiderer.
Macha of the Red Tresses	Unknown	Ireland	Boadaceia	According to medieval legend and historical tradition, the only queen in the List of High Kings of Ireland.
Macha	Mythical	Celtic Ireland	Fertile Goddess	Fertility goddess
Macrina	c. 330	Ancient Rome	Marcella	A nun in the Early Christian Church and a saint in the Roman Catholic, Eastern Catholic, and Eastern Orthodox Church.
Maddalena Buonsignori	Unknown	Italy	Christine de Pisan	A law professor at the University of Bologna.
Madderakka	Mythical	Lapland	Fertile Goddess	Goddess of childbirth
Madeleine de Demandolx	Unknown	France	Petronilla de Meath	A nun who was one of the alleged cases of demonic possession occurring among the Ursuline nuns of Aix-en-Provence (South of France) in 1611.
Madeleine de Sable	1599	France	Natalie Barney	A writer.
Madeleine de Scudéry	1607	France	Natalie Barney	A writer.
Magda Portal	1900	Peru	Sacajawea	A Peruvian author, feminist, poet, and political activist and leader. She was one of the founders of the APRA (American Popular Revolutionary Alliance) political party.
Mahaut of Artois	1268	France	Isabella d'Este	She inherited the County of Artois at her father's death in 1302; she was an able administrator and managed to defeat the many rebellions perpetrated by members of the nobility.
Makeda	b. 1020 BC	North Africa	Hatshepsut	The Ethiopian name for Queen of Sheba. She heard that King Solomon was very wise so she traveled to meet him with many gifts with the intention of questioning him. Her story is found in the Bible and the Qur'an.
Mama Oclo	c. 12th century	Peru	Hatshepsut	Co-founder of Inca Dynasty. Considered to be an intermediary between the creator god and humans, she was given the task of civilizing the earth and organizing its people.
Manto	Mythical	Greek myth	Sappho	The daughter of the blind prophet Tiresias. It was said that Manto's abilities in prophecy were much greater than her father's. She is one of the fortune-tellers and diviners whom Dante sees in the fourth pit of the eighth circle of the Inferno.
Margaret Brent	c. 1601	England, colony of Maryland	Anne Hutchinson	An important founding settler of Maryland who was appointed as the executrix of the governor, Lord Calvert's, estate and as such helped ensure soldiers were paid and given food.
Margaret Cavendish	1623	England	Caroline Herschel	An aristocrat, a prolific writer, and a scientist.
Margaret of Lincoln	c. 1206	England	Eleanor of Aquitaine	A wealthy noblewoman and heiress.
Margaret Fell Fox	1614	England	Anne Hutchinson	A founder of the Religious Society of Friends.
Margaret Fuller	1810	America	Emily Dickinson	A critic, journalist, and women's rights advocate whose book Woman in the Nineteenth Century is considered the first major feminist work in the United States.
Margaret Jones	Unknown	Massachusetts Bay Colony	Petronilla de Meath	The first person to be executed for witchcraft in Massachusetts Bay Colony.
Margaret Mead	1901	America	Margaret Sanger	A cultural anthropologist.
Margaret Murray Washington	1865	America	Sojourner Truth	The principal of Tuskegee Normal and Industrial Institute, which later became Tuskegee University.
Margaret Murray	1863	United Kingdom	Elizabeth Blackwell	Important English Egyptologist, archaeologist, anthropologist, and folklorist. First female to be appointed as a lecturer in archaeology in the United Kingdom.
Margaret O'Connor	Unknown; died 1451	Ireland	Christine de Pisan	A noblewoman remembered for her piety and hospitality.
Margaret of Austria	1480	Austria	Elizabeth R.	Governor of the Habsburg Netherlands from 1507 to 1515 and again from 1519 to 1530.
Marguerite of Bourgogne	1250	Unknown	Hildegarde of Bingen	Queen of Sicily
Margaret of Desmond	1473	Ireland	Elizabeth R.	Irish noblewoman.
Margaret of Porète	Unknown; died 1310	France	Petronilla de Meath	A mystic and author, burned at the stake for heresy.
Margaret of Scandinavia	1353	Denmark	Elizabeth R.	Queen of Denmark, Norway, and Sweden and founder of the Kalmar Union, which united the Scandinavian countries for over 100 years.
Margaret Paston	Unknown	England	Christine de Pisan	Writer of some of the Paston Letters.
Margaret Philipse	c. 1637	Province of New York	Anne Hutchinson	A merchant in the colonial Province of New York.
Margaret Roper	1505	England	Christine de Pisan	A writer and translator.
Margareta Karthauserin	Unknown	Germany	Christine de Pisan	A nun at the Dominican convent of Saint Catherine in Nuremberg and a very skilled scribe.
Margarete Forchhammer	1863	Denmark	Susan B. Anthony	An educator and women's rights activist.
Margarethe Dessoff	1874	Germany	Ethel Smyth	A choral conductor, singer, and voice teacher.
Margery Jourdemain	Unknown; before 1415	England	Petronilla de Meath	A woman accused of treasonable witchcraft and burned at the stake.
Margery Kempe	c. 1373	England	Christine de Pisan	A Christian mystic, best known for dictating The Book of Margery Kempe, which is considered by some to be the first autobiography in the English language.
Marguerita-Louise Couperin	1675/76 or 1678/79	France	Ethel Smyth	A soprano singer and harpsichordist.
Margaret of Navarre	1492	France	Elizabeth R.	Princess of France, Queen of Navarre, and Duchess of Alençon and Berry.
Marguerite Gérard	1761	France	Artemisia Gentileschi	A painter and etcher.
Marguerite-Antoinette Couperin	1705	France	Ethel Smyth	A harpsichordist, and the first female court musician to the King of France.
Maria Agnesi	1718	Italy	Anna van Schurman	A mathematician and philosopher.
Maria Alphaizuli	Unknown	Spain	Hrosvitha	A poet.
Maria Antonia Walpurgis	1724	Germany	Anna van Schurman	A composer, singer, harpsichordist and patron.
Maria Bartola	Unknown	Mexico	Sacajawea	The first historian of Mexico.
Maria Christine de Lalaing	Unknown	Tournai, Belgium	Elizabeth R.	Known for defending the city of Tournai against the duke of Parma.
Maria Cunitz	1610	Germany	Caroline Herschel	An astronomer.
Maria de Abarca	Unknown	Spain	Artemisia Gentileschi	A painter.
Maria de Agreda	Unknown	Spain	Anna van Schurman	A Franciscan abbess and spiritual writer.
Maria de Coste Blanche	c. 1520	France	Elizabeth R.	A translator and noblewoman.
María del Refugio García	c. 1898	Mexico	Sacajawea	A women's rights activist.
Maria de Ventadorn	Unknown	France	Eleanor of Aquitaine	A patron of troubadour poetry.
Maria de Zozoya	Unknown	Spain	Petronilla de Meath	A woman prosecuted for being a witch who died in prison.
Maria Edgeworth	1768	England and Ireland	Emily Dickinson	A writer.
Maria Kirch	1670	Germany	Caroline Herschel	Astronomer.
Maria Luisa Sanchez	1896	Bolivia	Sacajawea	Bolivia's most prominent feminist; founder of Atene Femenino, Bolivia's first women's rights organisation.
Maria Mitchell	1818	America	Caroline Herschel	An astronomer who discovered "Miss Mitchell's Comet".
Maria Montessori	1870	Italy	Margaret Sanger	The founder of the Montessori method.
Maria Montoya Martinez	1887	America	Sacajawea	A Native American potter.
Maria Salvatori	Unknown	Italy	Petronilla de Meath	A woman accused of witchcraft.
Maria Sibylla Merian	1647	Holy Roman Empire, Dutch Republic	Artemisia Gentileschi	A naturalist and scientific illustrator.
Maria Stewart	1803	America	Sojourner Truth	A journalist, lecturer, abolitionist, and women's rights activist.
Maria Theresa	1717	Europe	Elizabeth R.	The only female ruler of the Habsburg dominions and the last of the House of Habsburg.
Maria Theresia von Paradis	1759	Austria	Ethel Smyth	A blind musician and composer.
Marian Anderson	1897	America	Sojourner Truth	A singer.
Marianna Alcoforado	1640	Portugal	Anna van Schurman	A nun, possibly the author of the Letters of a Portuguese Nun.
Marianne Beth	1889	Austria, America	Elizabeth Blackwell	A lawyer and women's rights activist.
Marie Bashkirtsev	1858	Russian Empire	Georgia O'Keeffe	A diarist, painter, and sculptor.
Marie Bovin	1773	France	Elizabeth Blackwell	A midwife, inventor, and obstetrics writer.
Marie Champmeslé	1642	France	Artemisia Gentileschi	An actress.
Marie Colinet	c. 1560	Switzerland, Germany	Caroline Herschel	A midwife and surgeon.
Marie Curie	1867	Poland, France	Elizabeth Blackwell	The first woman to win a Nobel Prize, the first person and only woman to win twice, and the only person to win twice in multiple sciences.
Marie de France	Unknown	France, possibly England	Eleanor of Aquitaine	A poet.
Marie de l'Incarnation	1599	France, Canada	Anne Hutchinson	The leader of the group of nuns sent to establish the Ursuline Order in New France; she founded the oldest women's educational institution in North America.
Marie de Lafayette	Unknown; baptized 18 March 1634	France	Mary Wollstonecraft	The author of France's first historical novel, La Princesse de Clèves.
Marie de Miramion	1629	France	Anna van Schurman	A woman known for her piety and the organizations she founded.
Marie de Sévigné	1626	France	Natalie Barney	An aristocrat known for her letter-writing.
Marie de' Medici	1575	France	Isabella d'Este	Queen of France
Marie du Deffand	1697	France	Natalie Barney	A hostess and patron of the arts.
Marie Dugès	1730	France	Elizabeth Blackwell	A midwife.
Marie Durocher	1809	Brazil	Elizabeth Blackwell	The first female doctor in Latin America.
Marie Geoffrin	1699	France	Natalie Barney	One of the leading women in the French Enlightenment.
Marie Heim-Vögtlin	1845	Switzerland	Elizabeth Blackwell	The first female Swiss physician and a co-founder of the first Swiss gynecological hospital.
Marie Iowa	c. 1786	America	Sacajawea	The only female member of the Astor Expedition, which traveled overland from St. Louis, Missouri, to what became Astoria, Oregon, in 1811–12.
Marie LaChapelle	1769	France	Elizabeth Blackwell	The head of obstetrics at the Hôtel Dieu, the oldest hospital in Paris. She is generally considered the mother of modern obstetrics.
Marie Laurencin	1883	France	Georgia O'Keeffe	A painter and printmaker.
Marie Lavoisier	1758	France	Caroline Herschel	A chemist.
Maria Le Jars de Gournay	1565	France	Anna van Schurman	A writer.
Marie of Champagne	1145	France	Eleanor of Aquitaine	Daughter of Eleanor of Aquitaine and Louis VII. Ruled as regent of Champagne three times, and was a noted patron of troubadours.
Marie Popelin	1846	Belgium	Elizabeth Blackwell	A Belgian feminist, lawyer, and political campaigner.
Marie Sallé	1707	France	Natalie Barney	A dancer and choreographer.
Marie Stopes	1880	Britain	Margaret Sanger	An author, palaeobotanist, academic, eugenicist, campaigner for women's rights, and pioneer in the field of birth control.
Marie Tussaud	1761	France, England	Mary Wollstonecraft	An artist, known for founding Madame Tussauds wax museum in London.
Marie Vernier	c. 1590	France	Artemisia Gentileschi	An actress, commonly thought to be the first French actress to be known by name.
Martesia	Mythical, c. 13th century BC	Greece	Amazon	Amazon queen. Co-ruled with sister Lampedo.
Martha Baretskaya	Unknown	Novgorod	Christine de Pisan	According to legend and historical tradition, she led the republic's struggle against Muscovy between her husband's death and the city's eventual annexation by Ivan III of Russia in 1478.
Martha Graham	1894	America	Georgia O'Keeffe	A dancer.
Martha Mears	Unknown	England	Caroline Herschel	A midwife and author.
Martha of Bethany	Unknown	Ancient Israel	Marcella	A biblical figure described in the Gospels of Luke and John.
Martia Proba	Mythical	Britain	Saint Bridget	The mythical third female ruler and a regent of the Britons, as recounted by Geoffrey of Monmouth.
Mary "Mother" Jones	1837	Ireland, America	Margaret Sanger	A labor and community organizer who cofounded the Industrial Workers of the World.
Mary Alexander	1693	America	Anne Hutchinson	An influential colonial era merchant in New York City.
Mary Müller	1819 or 1820	England and New Zealand	Susan B. Anthony	A New Zealand suffragist.
Mary Radcliffe	c. 1746	Britain	Mary Wollstonecraft	An important British figure in the early feminist movement.
Mary Ann Shadd Cary	1823	America, Canada	Sojourner Truth	The first black woman publisher in North America and the first woman publisher in Canada.
Mary Astell	1666	England	Anna van Schurman	A feminist writer and rhetorician, known as "the first English feminist."
Mary Baker Eddy	1821	America	Anne Hutchinson	The founder of Christian Science.
Mary Bonaventure	After 1610	Ireland	Anne Hutchinson	A Poor Clare and Irish historian.
Mary Cassatt	1844	America, France	Georgia O'Keeffe	A painter and printmaker.
Mary Church Terrell	1863	America	Susan B. Anthony	One of the first African-American women to earn a college degree, and a national activist for civil rights and suffrage.
Mary Dyer	c. 1611	England	Anne Hutchinson	A Quaker who was hanged in Boston, Massachusetts Bay Colony, for repeatedly defying a Puritan law banning Quakers from the colony.
Mary Walker	1832	America	Elizabeth Blackwell	An American feminist, abolitionist, prohibitionist, alleged spy, prisoner of war and surgeon.
Mary Esther Harding	1888	England, America	Virginia Woolf	The first significant Jungian psychoanalyst in the United States.
Mary Goddard	1738	America	Anne Hutchinson	An early American publisher and the first American postmaster. She was the first to print the Declaration of Independence with the names of the signatories.
Mary Hays	1759	England	Mary Wollstonecraft	A novelist.
Mary Lamb	1764	England	Caroline Herschel	A writer.
Mary Lee	1821	Ireland, Australia	Susan B. Anthony	A suffragist and social reformer in South Australia.
Mary Livermore	1820	America	Sojourner Truth	A journalist and advocate of women's rights.
Mary Lou Williams	1910	America	Ethel Smyth	A jazz pianist, composer, and arranger.
Mary Louise McLaughlin	1847	America	Georgia O'Keeffe	A ceramic painter and studio potter, and one of the originators of the art pottery movement that swept the United States.
Mary Lyon	1797	America	Emily Dickinson	She established Mount Holyoke Female Seminary (now Mount Holyoke College) in South Hadley, Massachusetts in 1837 and served as its first president (or "principal") for 12 years.
Mary Magdalene	1st century	Galilee	Marcella	A female disciple of Jesus who stood by him during his crucifixion after most of his male disciples had abandoned him; revered as a saint by the Catholic, Orthodox, Anglican and Lutheran churches. It is popularly believed that Mary Magdalene was a prostitute, and she is often depicted as the "penitent Magdalene."
Mary Manley	1663 or c. 1670	England	Mary Wollstonecraft	An author, playwright, and political pamphleteer. Her first name is actually Delarivier (sometimes spelt Delariviere, Delarivière or de la Rivière) or Delia.
Mary McLeod Bethune	1875	America	Sojourner Truth	An educator and civil rights leader best known for starting a private school for African-American students in Daytona Beach, Florida.
Mary Monckton	1746	Britain	Mary Wollstonecraft	A literary hostess.
Mary Musgrove	c. 1700	America	Sacajawea	She facilitated in the development of Colonial Georgia and became an important intermediary between Muscogee Creek Indians and the English colonists.
Mary of Bethany	Unknown	Ancient Israel	Marcella	A biblical figure described in the Gospels of John and Luke in the Christian New Testament.
Mary of Hungary	1505	Europe	Elizabeth R.	Queen consort of Hungary and Bohemia as the wife of King Louis II, and was later Governor of the Habsburg Netherlands.
Mary Read	c. 1690	England	Natalie Barney	A pirate and one of the only two women to be convicted of piracy during the 18th century.
Mary Shelley	1797	London	Mary Wollstonecraft	Author of Frankenstein and daughter of Mary Wollstonecraft.
Mary Sidney	1561	England	Elizabeth R.	Mary Herbert, the Countess of Pembroke. One of the first English women to achieve a major reputation for her poetry and literary patronage.
Mary Somerville	1780	Scotland	Caroline Herschel	Science writer and polymath, at a time when women's participation in science was discouraged. She studied mathematics and astronomy, and was nominated to be jointly the first female member of the Royal Astronomical Society at the same time as Caroline Herschel.
Mary Wortley Montagu	1689	England, Turkey	Mary Wollstonecraft	An aristocrat and writer.
Maryann	8th Century	Spain	Hrosvitha	Same person as Maria Alphaizuli.
Mata Hari	1876	Netherlands	Natalie Barney	Born Margaretha Geertruida "Margreet" MacLeod, a Frisian exotic dancer and courtesan who was convicted of being a spy and executed by firing squad in France under charges of espionage for Germany during World War I
Mathilda of Germany	1418	Germany	Isabella d'Este	A princess and major patroness of the literary arts.
Mathilde of Tuscany	1046	Italy	Eleanor of Aquitaine	A powerful feudal ruler in northern Italy and the chief Italian supporter of Pope Gregory VII during the Investiture Controversy.
Matilda	1080	England	Eleanor of Aquitaine	Queen of England as the wife of King Henry I. She was known as "Good Queen Maud" for her charitable works. She also known as a patron of music and literature.
Matilda of Flanders	c. 1031	England, Flanders	Eleanor of Aquitaine	Queen of England. Her husband was William the Conqueror. She often ruled Normandy as regent during his absences in England.
Mathilda	955	Germany	Hrosvitha	Daughter of Emperor Otto I. Became the first Princess-Abbess of Quedlinburg in 966.
Maude	c.892	Germany	Theodora	Saint Matilda, The wife of King Henry I of Germany, the first ruler of the Saxon Ottonian (or Liudolfing) dynasty, and thereby Duchess (consort) of Saxony from 912 and Queen (consort) of Germany (East Francia) from 919 until her husband's death in 936. Founded the Abbey of Quedlinburg.
Maximilla	2nd century	Phrygia	Saint Bridget	One of the founders and prophets of Montanism, an early Christian movement.
Maya Deren	1917	Ukraine, America	Georgia O'Keeffe	One of the most important American experimental filmmakers and entrepreneurial promoters of the avant-garde in the 1940s and 1950s.
Meave	Mythical	Ireland	Boadaceia	Queen of Connacht in the Ulster Cycle of Irish mythology.
Mechthild of Hackeborn	1250 or 1241	Germany	Hildegarde of Bingen	A Saxon Christian saint (from what is now Germany) and a Benedictine nun.
Mechthild of Magdeburg	c. 1207	Germany	Hildegarde of Bingen	A medieval mystic, whose book Das fließende Licht der Gottheit (The Flowing Light of Divinity) described her visions of God.
Medb	Mythical	Ireland	Boadaceia	A goddess of sovereignty associated with Tara.
Medusa	Mythical	Greece	Amazon	Leader of Gorgons, Amazon
Megalostrata	Unknown	Ancient Greece	Sappho	A Spartan poet.
Melisande	c. 1104	Edessa, Crusader States	Eleanor of Aquitaine	Queen of Jerusalem from 1131 to 1153, and regent for her son between 1153 and 1161 while he was on campaign.
Mentuhetop	c. 2300 BC	Egypt	Hatshepsut	Queen of 11th Dynasty at Thebes. Practiced medicine.
Mercy Otis Warren	1728	America	Anne Hutchinson	A political writer and propagandist of the American Revolution.
Metrodora	c. AD 200	Greece	Hypatia	A physician and author of the oldest medical text known to have been written by a woman, On the Diseases and Cures of Women.
Milla Granson	1816	America	Sojourner Truth	A pioneering educator.
Millicent Garrett Fawcett	1847	England	Susan B. Anthony	A feminist, intellectual, political and union leader, and writer, best known as a suffragist.
Minna Canth	1844	Finland	Susan B. Anthony	A writer and social activist.
Minna Cauer	1841	Germany	Susan B. Anthony	An educator, journalist and radical activist within the middle-class women's movement.
Miranda Stuart	c. 1789	Ireland	Elizabeth Blackwell	A military surgeon in the British Army under the name James Barry. Real birth name Margaret Anne Bulkley; Miranda Stuart seems to be a later invention. (Note: Barry is now considered by many modern historians to have been a transgender man rather than a woman. He was not, however, recognised as such in 1979 when this installation was first created, and so his gender is listed there as female.)
Miriam	Unknown	Ancient Israel	Judith	In the Bible, the elder sister of Moses and Aaron, and the only daughter of Amram and Yocheved. She appears first in the Book of Exodus in the Hebrew Bible.
Modesta Pozzo	1555	Italy	Christine de Pisan	A writer and poet.
Moero	Unknown	City of Byzantium	Sappho	A poet of the 3rd century BC from the city of Byzantium.
Molly Pitcher	1754 (if Mary Ludwig Hays McCauley)	America	Anne Hutchinson	A nickname given to a woman said to have fought in the American Battle of Monmouth, who is generally believed to have been Mary Ludwig Hays McCauley.
Morrigan	Mythical	Celtic Ireland	Kali	Great queen
Mother Hutton	Unknown	England	Caroline Herschel	A pharmacist and herbalist responsible for the discovery of digitalis and its essential use in the curing of heart problems.
Muirgel	Unknown	Ireland	Boadaceia	An Irish woman who slew a Viking chieftain in 882.
Myrine	Mythical	Libya	Amazon	Led 30,000 Libyan women to battle against Gorgons, another Amazon tribe
Myrtis	Unknown	Ancient Greece	Sappho	Poet purported to be the teacher of Pindar of Thebes and Corinna of Tanagra.
Nadezhda Krupskaya	1869	Russia	Margaret Sanger	A Russian Bolshevik revolutionary and politician, and the wife of Vladimir Lenin from 1898 until his death in 1924.
Nadia Boulanger	1887	France	Ethel Smyth	A composer, conductor, musician, and teacher who taught many of the leading composers and musicians of the 20th century as well as leading living composers and musicians.
Nammu	Mythical	Sumer	Primordial Goddess	Controller of Primeval Waters
Nancy Ward	c. 1738	America	Sacajawea	A Beloved Woman of the Cherokee, which means that she was allowed to sit in councils and to make decisions, along with the chiefs and other Beloved Women.
Nanno	Unknown	Ancient Greece	Sappho	A flute player who Mimnermus was in love with and who gave her name, Nanno, to one of his two books.
Naomi	Unknown	Ancient Israel	Judith	Ruth's mother-in-law in the Old Testament Book of Ruth.
Naqi'a	Fl. c. 680–627 BC	Assyria (modern-day Iraq)	Hatshepsut	Naqi'a-Zakutu, Assyrian queen, royal advisor.
Natalia Goncharova	1881	Russia	Georgia O'Keeffe	An avant-garde artist, painter, costume designer, writer, illustrator, and set designer.
Nathalie Zand	1883 or 1884	Poland	Elizabeth Blackwell	A neurologist.
Nefertiti	c. 1300 BC	Egypt	Hatshepsut	Egyptian Queen
Neith	Mythical	Egypt	Primordial Goddess	Wove the world on her loom, virgin goddess
Nell Gwyn	1650	England and Scotland	Artemisia Gentileschi	One of the first English actresses, and long-time mistress of King Charles II of England and Scotland.
Nelly Sachs	1891	Germany	Virginia Woolf	A poet and playwright.
Neobule	Unknown	Greece	Sappho	A woman addressed in the 7th-century BC Greek poetry of Archilochus.
Nephthys	Mythical	Egypt	Kali	Goddess of death
Nerthus	Mythical	Britain/Germany	Fertile Goddess	Earth mother
Nicaula	c. 980 BC	Ethiopia	Hatshepsut	Scholar, queen
Nicobule	Unknown	Ancient Greece	Aspasia	A woman who may have authored a work on the life of Alexander the Great.
Aruru	Mythical	Babylonia	Primordial Goddess	Helped create humans out of clay
Ninhursaga	Mythical	Sumer	Primordial Goddess	Mother of the Land
Ninon de l'Enclos	1620	France	Natalie Barney	An author, courtesan, freethinker, and patron of the arts.
Ninti	Mythical	Sumer	Fertile Goddess	Healing deity, cured Enkin's rib
Nitocris	6th century BC	Assyria	Hatshepsut	Possibly mythical Queen of Babylon
Nofret	c. 1900 BC	Egypt	Hatshepsut	Queen, "ruler of all women", progressive leader of Egyptian women's rights
Nossis	Unknown	Italy, possibly Greece	Sappho	An ancient epigrammist and poet.
Novella d'Andrea	1312	Italy	Isabella d'Este	An Italian legal scholar and professor in law at the university of Bologna.
Nut	Mythical	Egypt	Primordial Goddess	Goddess of the sky
Octavia	69 BC	Ancient Rome	Marcella	One of the most prominent women in Roman history; she was the sister of the first Roman Emperor, Augustus (known also as Octavian), half-sister of Octavia the Elder, and fourth wife of Mark Antony.
Odilla	c. 662	Europe	Trotula	A saint venerated in the Roman Catholic Church and the Orthodox Church.
Ofelia Uribe de Acosta	1900	Colombia	Sacajawea	A Colombian suffragist.
Olga	c. 890	Rus'	Theodora	A saint and a ruler of Kievan Rus' as regent (945–c. 963) for her son, Svyatoslav.
Oliva Sabuco	1562	Spain	Elizabeth R.	A writer in holistic medical philosophy.
Olive Schreiner	1855	Lesotho, South Africa, Europe	Virginia Woolf	An author, anti-war campaigner and intellectual.
Olympe de Gouges	1741	France	Mary Wollstonecraft	A playwright and political activist.
Olympia Morata	1526	Italy	Isabella d'Este	A classical scholar.
Olympia	Sometime between 361 and 368	Rome	Theodora	A Christian Roman noblewoman of Greek descent.
Olympias	c. 375 BC	Macedon	Boadaceia	A daughter of king Neoptolemus I of Epirus, the fourth wife of the king of Macedonia, Philip II, and mother of Alexander the Great.
Omeciuatl	Mythical	Mesoamerica	Primordial Goddess	Co-creator of spirit of human life
Orithyia	Legendary, c. 13th century BC	Scythia	Amazon	Amazon queen. Co-ruled with sisters Antiope and Hippolyte.
Phamphile	Flourished 1st century AD	Greece, possibly Egypt	Hypatia	A historian who lived in the reign of Nero.
Pandora	Legendary	Greece	Sophia	Pandora's box
Pasiphae	Mythical	Crete	Snake Goddess	Daughter of Helios, and Queen of Crete alongside Minos. Was cursed by Poseidon to fall in love with a white bull that Minos had refused to sacrifice, thus becoming the mother of the Minotaur. Was later worshiped as a goddess in Sparta.
Paula Modersohn-Becker	1876	Germany	Georgia O'Keeffe	A painter and one of the most important representatives of early expressionism.
Penelope Barker	1728	America	Anne Hutchinson	An activist in the American Revolution who in 1774 organised a boycott of British goods known as the Edenton Tea Party.
Penthelia	Exact date uncertain	Memphis, ancient Egypt	Sappho	Egyptian priestess-musician who served the creator god Ptah, the god of fire, in the temple of Memphis Ancient Egypt. Some sources ascribe to her the true authorship of the Iliad and the Odyssey.
Penthesilea	d. 1187 BC	North Africa	Amazon	Last Amazon queen.
Perictyone	Fl. 5th century BC	Ancient Greece	Aspasia	The mother of the Greek philosopher Plato.
Pernette Du Guillet	c. 1520	France	Elizabeth R.	A poet.
Kore	Mythical	Greece	Snake Goddess	Persephone, abducted by Hades to become Queen of the Underworld.
Phantasia	12th century BC	Egypt	Hatshepsut	Storyteller, musician, poet.
Phile	Unknown	Ancient Greece	Aspasia	The first recorded benefactress and the first female magistrate in the ancient Greek city of Priene.
Philippa of Hainault	1314	England	Elizabeth R.	Queen of England
Phillipe Auguste	12th Century	France	Hildegarde of Bingen	Allegedly a nun and medical woman, although no such person seems to have existed. Possibly a misreading of Philip II of France, known as Philip Augustus / Philippe Auguste.
Phillis Wheatley	c. 1753	West Africa, America, England	Anne Hutchinson	The first published African-American female poet.
Philotis	Legendary	Ancient Rome	Hypatia	In Roman legend, slave (ancilla) whose plan resulted in an important victory of the Romans over the Latins in the late 4th century BC.
Phoebe	Unknown	Greece	Marcella	A first-century Christian woman mentioned by the Apostle Paul in his Epistle to the Romans, verses 16:1-2. A notable woman in the church of Cenchreae, she was trusted by Paul to deliver his letter to the Romans.
Pierrone	Unknown; died 1430	France	Petronilla de Meath	A woman who said she saw visions of "God dressed in a long white robe with a red tunic underneath". She also tried to defend Joan of Arc, and was burned at the stake for that.
Plotina	1st century	Hispania, Rome	Marcella	Roman Empress who used her influence to improve the quality of life for Roman society by creating fairer taxes, improving education, etc.
Pocahontas	c. 1595	America, England	Sacajawea	A Virginia Indian notable for her association with the colonial settlement at Jamestown, Virginia.
Pope Joan	Legendary	Europe	Trotula	According to popular legend, a woman who reigned as pope for a few years during the Middle Ages.
Porcia	Unknown	Ancient Rome	Marcella	A Roman woman who lived in the 1st century BC, best known for being the second wife of Marcus Junius Brutus, the most famous of Julius Caesar's assassins, and for her suicide, reputedly by swallowing hot coals.
Praxagora	Legendary	Greece	Sophia	Leader of group of cross dressing women in play by Aristophanes (The Assemblywomen.)
Praxilla	Unknown	Ancient Greece	Sappho	A lyric poet of the 5th century BC.
Wanda	Unknown	Poland	Theodora	The daughter of Krakus, legendary founder of Kraków. Upon her father's death, she became queen of the Poles, but committed suicide to avoid an unwanted marriage.
Priscilla	Unknown	Unknown	Marcella	A woman who lived, worked, and traveled with the Apostle Paul, who described her and her husband as his "fellow workers in Christ Jesus".[Rom. 16:3 NASB]
Properzia de' Rossi	c. 1490	Italy	Artemisia Gentileschi	A renaissance sculptor. Originally praised for her skill at carving fruit stones, she went on to sculpt portrait busts and, eventually, to beat her male rivals for church commissions. However, tormented by unrequited love for a nobleman, she apparently sickened and died penniless.
Prudence Crandall	1803	America	Sojourner Truth	She admitted a 17-year-old African-American female student to her private school in the autumn of 1833, resulting in what is widely regarded as the first integrated classroom in the United States.
Puduhepa	c. 1280–1250 BC	Hittite Empire	Hatshepsut	Queen, priestess
Pulcheria	AD 398 or 399	Eastern Roman Empire	Theodora	Saint and Empress of the Eastern Roman Empire.
Pythia	Legendary	Greece	Sophia	Consulted by psychics in temple named after her.
Python	Mythical	Greece	Snake Goddess	Female serpent that lived near temple of Delphi.
Rachel Carson	1907	United States	Margaret Sanger	American marine biologist and conservationist whose book Silent Spring and other writings are credited with advancing the global environmental movement.
Rachel Katznelson	1885	Israel	Margaret Sanger	Prominent figure in Zionist movement. First Lady of Israel from 1963 to 1973, who was active in politics.
Rachel Ruysch	1664	The Hague, Northern Netherlands	Artemisia Gentileschi	17th-century and 18th-century flower painter. She is recorded as earning well from her paintings and living to a great age.
Rachel Varnhagen	1771	Germany	Mary Wollstonecraft	German writer who hosted one of the most prominent salons of the late 18th and early 19th century.
Rachel	Unknown	Ancient Israel	Judith	In the Bible, the favorite of Biblical patriarch Jacob's two wives as well as the mother of Joseph and Benjamin, two of the twelve progenitors of the tribes of Israel.
Radclyffe Hall	1880	United Kingdom	Natalie Barney	English poet and author. Famous for the lesbian classic, "The Well of Loneliness", which caused a public uproar and subsequently subjected to an obscenity trial, after which it was banned for a while in the UK and the States.
Radegund	c .520	Germany	Theodora	Thuringian princess and Frankish queen, who founded the Abbey of the Holy Cross at Poitiers.
Rahonem	Old Kingdom	Egypt	Hatshepsut	Queen, priestess, music leader
Rachel	Unknown	France	Trotula	Yocheved, Miriam, and Rachel, daughters of the medieval Talmudic scholar Rashi, feature in several legends suggesting that they possessed unusual piety and scholarship.
Rebecca Lee	1831	United States	Elizabeth Blackwell	First African-American woman to become a physician in the United States.
Rebecca West	1892	England	Virginia Woolf	Feminist author, literary critic, journalist, and travel writer. Involved in women's suffrage movement.
Rebekah	Unknown	Ancient Israel	Judith	She appears in the Hebrew Bible as the wife of Isaac and the mother of Jacob and Esau.
Renée Vivien	1877	England, France	Natalie Barney	Symbolist poet known both for her work and her open lifestyle within the lesbian coterie of Paris, which included a long relationship with Natalie Barney.
Rhea	Mythical	Crete	Snake Goddess	Earth mother
Rhea Silva	Legendary	Rome	Sophia	Priestess, mother of Romulus and Remus
Rhiannon	Mythical	Wales	Kali	Great queen, magician, deity.
Romaine Brooks	1874	United States, France	Natalie Barney	American painter who lived in Europe, mostly in Paris. Famous mostly for her portraits of cross-dressing and gender-defying women, and for influencing Aubrey Beardsley's illustrations. A popular and prominent figure in the sapphic "sewing circles" of Paris. Partner of the infamous salon hostess Natalie Barney, and briefly the partner of the Russian dancer and Belle Epoque muse Ida Rubenstein.
Rosa Bonheur	1822	France	Georgia O'Keeffe	An animalière, realist artist, and sculptor; she is widely considered to have been the most famous female painter of the nineteenth century.
Rosa Luxemburg	1871	Germany and the Russian Empire	Margaret Sanger	A Marxist theorist, economist, philosopher, and revolutionary socialist.
Rosalba Carriera	1673	Italy	Artemisia Gentileschi	Venetian Rococo portrait artist who was famous and sought-after throughout much of Europe, especially in France.
Rosalia of Palermo	1130	Italy	Hildegarde of Bingen	The patron saint of Palermo in Italy, and three towns in Venezuela: El Hatillo, Zuata, and Anzoátegui.
Rosana Chouteau	Unknown	Osage Nation	Sacajawea	The first woman to be elected chief of the Osage Beaver Band, a clan of the Native American Osage Nation in Oklahoma.
Rose de Burford	14th century	London, England	Christine de Pisan	14th century merchant and business woman. The embroidered garments she sold adorned royalty and even the pope.
Rose Mooney	1740	Ireland	Ethel Smyth	Blind itinerant harpist.
Ruth	Unknown	Ancient Israel	Judith	The protagonist of the Book of Ruth in the Hebrew Bible.
Ruth Benedict	1887	United States	Margaret Sanger	American anthropologist and folklorist. President of American Anthropological Association, first woman to be recognized as prominent leader of learned profession.
Saaredra Villanueva	1897	Bolivia	Sacajawea	Full name Etelvina Villanueva y Saavedra. Bolivian poet and educator who founded an important feminist group, Legión Femenina de Educación Popular de America.
Sabina von Steinbach	Early 13th century	Alsace/Eastern France	Artemisia Gentileschi	Legendary stonemason and daughter of Erwin von Steinbach, master builder at Notre Dame de Strasbourg. While it was not unthinkable for a woman to be a stonemason in the 13th century, scholars debate whether or not she actually existed.
Barbara	3rd century	Turkey or Phoenicia	Hypatia	The patron saint of those in peril. She was a Christian martyr, betrayed and then beheaded by her own father.
Fabiola	Flourished 4th century	Rome	Marcella	Was a Roman matron among the company of noble Roman women who, under the influence of the Church father St. Jerome, gave up all earthly pleasures and devoted themselves to the practice of Christian asceticism and to charitable work.
Lucy	283	Sicily	Saint Bridget	A young Christian martyr who died during the Diocletianic Persecution.
Marcellina	circa 330/335	Rome	Marcella	She was the only sister of Saint Ambrose of Milan who received the veil of consecrated virginity to live a life of perpetual virginity and to devote herself to the practice of prayer and asceticism.
Margaret	1242	Hungary	Hildegarde of Bingen	A royal princess who took solemn vows at the age of eighteen and thereafter lived in a convent a life of extreme austerity and penance that included ceaseless body mortification.
Margaret	circa 1045	England / Scotland	Eleanor of Aquitaine	Born in exile in Hungary, she was an Anglo-Saxon princess who fled to the Kingdom of Scotland following the Norman conquest of England of 1066. Around 1070 she married Malcolm III of Scotland and became Queen. She was considered an exemplar of the just ruler and had an important influence on Scottish culture introducing continental customs and fashion to the Scottish court and embarking on a reform program in the Scottish church.
Paula	347	Rome	Marcella	Early Christian who was a noble Roman convert who followed St Jerome.
Walpurgis	circa 710	England	Trotula	Became a missionary and worked with her brothers, Wynnebald and Willibald, in Germany until she settled in a convent at Heidenheim. Walpurgis Night, a spring celebration held in parts of Germany, Finland, Sweden, Estonia, Lithuania, Latvia, Romania, and the Czech Republic, celebrates her.
Salomée Halpir	1718	Poland	Elizabeth Blackwell	A successful medical doctor who specialized as an oculist. The first female doctor from the Grand Duchy of Lithuania. Her memoirs, written in 1760, are a unique example of a travel memoir and women's literature.
Salpe	Flourished before the 3rd century BC	Ancient Greece	Aspasia	A midwife, physician and medical writer who favored the use of bodily fluids as curatives. Described in texts by Pliny the Elder.
Sarah Bernhardt	1844/45	France	Georgia O'Keeffe	Widely considered the most significant French actress of the nineteenth century. She developed a reputation as a serious dramatic actress, earning the nickname "The Divine Sarah."
Sarah Grimké	1792	United States	Sojourner Truth	American abolitionist, writer, and suffragist. Authored the first women's rights tract in the U.S., Letters on the Equality of the Sexes and the Condition of Women (1838).
Sarah Jennings	1660	England	Elizabeth R.	She rose to be one of the most influential women of her time through her close friendship and counsel with Queen Anne of Great Britain.
Sarah of St. Gilles	Flourished circa 1326	France	Trotula	A medieval medical practitioner. Her practice and medical knowledge is known through a contract with her student. This document is the earliest and best known example of this type of teacher-student contract.
Sarah Peale	1800	America	Anne Hutchinson	A successful portrait painter mainly of American politicians and military figures, and the occasional still life. Lafayette sat for her four times.
Sarah Siddons	1755	Wales	Artemisia Gentileschi	An actress, the best-known tragedienne of the 18th century. She was most famous for her portrayal of the Shakespearean character, Lady Macbeth, a character she made her own.
Sara Winnemucca	1844	Shoshonean tribe	Sacajawea	An advocate for Native Americans who founded the Peabody School for Native American children near Lovelock, Nevada, where children were taught in their own language but also learned English. The curriculum included the study of Native American history and culture.
Sarah	Reputedly flourished circa 1800 BC	Middle east	Judith	The wife of Abraham and the mother of Isaac as described in the Hebrew Bible and the Quran.
Scholastica	c. 480	Italy	Saint Bridget	She was the twin sister of the founder of the Benedictine Order, Saint Benedict. She was a nun and the leader of an early monastery for women, perhaps the first.
Selina Hastings	1707	England	Anne Hutchinson	The aristocratic Countess of Huntingdon, she was a pivotal figure in England's evangelical revival of the eighteenth century. She converted to Methodism and then founded her own sect of Calvinistic Methodists financed by her wealth.
Selma Lagerlöf	1858	Sweden	Virginia Woolf	In 1909 she became the first woman to win the Nobel Prize in Literature. She is most widely known for her children's book Nils Holgerssons underbara resa genom Sverige (The Wonderful Adventures of Nils).
Semiramis	9th century BC	Assyria	Hatshepsut	Legendary Queen of King Ninus. One of only two women to lead Babylon, she is credited with vast building works across the region.
Shibtu	c. 1700 BC	Syria	Ishtar	Queen of Mari. Many tablets of correspondence between Shibtu and her husband, King Zimri-Lim survive and show that she often managed the affairs of the kingdom.
Shub-Ad of Ur	c. 2500 BC	Sumer	Ishtar	Queen or priestess of 1st Dynasty of Ur. Her un-looted tomb was excavated between 1922 and 1934 and found to contain a rich collection of grave goods.
Sigrid Undset	1882	Norway	Virginia Woolf	A novelist who was awarded the Nobel Prize for Literature in 1928. Her texts often explore women's identity as a struggle between a true self and prescribed sexual and social roles.
Simone de Beauvoir	1908	France	Virginia Woolf	A writer, intellectual, existentialist philosopher, political activist, feminist and social theorist. She wrote The Second Sex, a detailed analysis of women's oppression and a foundational tract of contemporary feminism.
Simone Weil	1909	France	Virginia Woolf	A philosopher, educator, revolutionary, advocate for human rights, and mystic.
Sobeya	Flourished late 10th century	Spain	Eleanor of Aquitaine	A sultana who ruled the Caliph of Córdoba in Islamic Spain as a regent for her son Hisham II al-Hakam.
Sofia Kovalevskaya	1850	Russia	Elizabeth Blackwell	The first major Russian female mathematician, responsible for important original contributions to analysis, differential equations and mechanics, and the first woman appointed to a full professorship in Northern Europe.
Sonia Delaunay	1885	France / Ukraine	Georgia O'Keeffe	A painter, print-maker, and textile designer. Co-founded the Orphism art movement, noted for its use of strong colours and geometric shapes.
Sonja Henie	1912	Norway	Elizabeth Blackwell	Winner of ten consecutive world figure skating championships and three Olympic gold medals in 1928, 1932, and 1936. She had a further career as a Hollywood star.
Sophia Haydn	1868	United States / Chile	Georgia O'Keeffe	The first woman accepted to the architecture program at the Massachusetts Institute of Technology and a pioneer for women in the profession of architect.
Sophia Heath	1896	Ireland	Elizabeth Blackwell	A pioneer Irish aviator and proponent of women's events in the Olympic Games.
Sophia Perovskaya	1853	Russia	Margaret Sanger	A Russian revolutionary and a member of Narodnaya Volya. She helped to orchestrate the successful assassination of Alexander II of Russia for which she was executed.
Baroness of Adlersparre	1823	Sweden	Susan B. Anthony	Women's rights activist, publisher, editor, writer, debater, and co-founder of Sweden's first wave of feminism.
Sophie Blanchard	1778	France	Elizabeth Blackwell	The first female aeronaut and balloonist. Between 1805 and 1819 she conducted 59 balloon flights over Paris.
Sophie de Condorcet	1764	France	Natalie Barney	Was a prominent salon hostess from 1789 until the Reign of Terror, and again from 1799 until her death in 1822. Her salons were frequented by British and French intelligentsia.
Sophie Drinker	1888	United States	Ethel Smyth	An amateur musician and musicologist. She is considered a founder of women's musicological and gender studies.
Sophie Germain	1776	France	Caroline Herschel	Mathematician, physicist, and philosopher. Despite opposition from her parents and difficulties presented by society, she gained education from books in her father's library and from correspondence with famous mathematicians.
Sophia of Mecklenburg	1557	Germany	Elizabeth R.	A German noble and Queen of Denmark and Norway. Her interest in science manifested in her patronage of the astronomer Tycho Brahe.
Sophie Taeuber-Arp	1889	Switzerland	Georgia O'Keeffe	Artist, painter, sculptor, and dancer, considered one of the most important artists of geometric abstraction of the 20th century.
Sophonisba Angussola	c. 1532	Italy	Artemisia Gentileschi	An Italian Renaissance painter whose skill was recognized by Michelangelo and who made a career as a court painter.
Sor Juana de la Cruz	1648	Mexico	Sacajawea	A talented Mexican nun, self-taught scholar-writer, and poet of the Baroque school who amassed a major library. When she was criticised by the Church she published a defense of women's right to knowledge, the Respuesta a sor Filotea de la Cruz.
Stephanie de Genlis	1746	France	Natalie Barney	A writer, harpist and educator whose work included the well-received novel Adèle et Théodore; ou, Lettres sur l'éducation of 1782.
Stephanie de Montaneis	Flourished mid-13th century	France	Trotula	A physician in Lyons at a time when it difficult for any women to enter the medical field. It is believed she was trained by her father Étienne de Montaneis.
Sulpicia	Flourished circa 90	Italy	Hypatia	There are two Roman poets named Sulpicia. The one on the heritage floor refers to Sulpicia II, a poet whose best known works are a group of poems describing in explicit detail her relationship with her husband, and a second poem, in the form of a dialogue between Sulpicia and Calliope, the muse of epic poetry, which protests the banishing of philosophers from Rome in 94.
Susan la Flesche Piccotte	1865	United States	Elizabeth Blackwell	The first American Indian woman to become a physician in the United States. She was of mixed Omaha, Ponca, Iowa, French and Anglo-American descent, she grew up with her parents on the Omaha Reservation.
Susanna Lorantffy	1602	Hungary	Anna van Schurman	Assisted her husband, a Prince of Transylvania, in his successful struggle to introduce Protestant reforms in the Transylvanian church. Under her influence, John Amos Comenius, a prominent Calvinist teacher, took up residence in Sárospatak.
Susanna Rowson	1762	British-American	Emily Dickinson	Author of the 1791 novel Charlotte Temple, the most popular best-seller in American literature up to 1852.
Susanna Wesley	1669	England	Anne Hutchinson	Known as the Mother of Methodism because of her influence on her two sons, John Wesley and Charles Wesley who founded it.
Susanne Langer	1895	United States	Virginia Woolf	American philosopher of mind and of art. She was one of the first women to achieve an academic career in philosophy and the first to be popularly and professionally recognized as an American philosopher.
Suzanne Necker	1737	Switzerland	Mary Wollstonecraft	A salonist and writer. She hosted one of the most celebrated salons of the Ancien Régime.
Suzanne Valadon	1865	France	Georgia O'Keeffe	A French artist who became the first woman painter admitted to the Société Nationale des Beaux-Arts.
Sylvia Ashton-Warner	1908	New Zealand	Margaret Sanger	Writer, novelist, educator, theorist, painter, and memoirist.
Sylvia	Mid fourth century	Aquitaine, France	Saint Bridget	Saint Sylvia of Aquitaine, an abbess, is known for her journal describing her travels to holy sites in the Near East between 385 and 388AD. It is considered to be one of the earliest travel books ever written. However, the journal is now attributed to a Hispano-Roman woman named Egeria.
Sylvia Pankhurst	1882	England	Susan B. Anthony	A campaigner for the suffragist and working class movements in the United Kingdom.
Tanaquil	c. 570 BC	Etruria	Hatshepsut	Roman queen, prophet, artist and politician.
Tanith	Mythical	Carthage	Ishtar	Goddess of heaven and the moon.
Tarquinia Molza	1542	Italy	Isabella d'Este	A celebrated Italian singer, poet, and natural philosopher.
Tefnut	Mythical	Egypt	Primordial Goddess	Goddess of dew and rain. Tefnut is often depicted as a cat, a symbol of war, relating to a myth in which she fought with Shu and fled Egypt.
Telesilla	fl. 510 BC	Argos, Ancient Greece	Aspasia	A poet who led the women and slaves of Argos to defend the city against the Spartans who had killed all its men.
Tellus Mater	Mythical	Rome	Fertile Goddess	Roman goddess of fecundity. Her festival, held annually on April 15, was called the Fordicia and required the sacrifice of pregnant cows.
Teresa de Cartagena	1425	Spain	Christine de Pisan	A nun who authored The Admiraçión operum Dey (Wonder at the Works of God) considered as the first feminist tract written by a Spanish woman.
Teresa Villarreal	1883	Mexico and Texas	Sacajawea	Revolutionary labor and feminist organizer, who supported the Partido Liberal Mexicano (PLM) during the Mexican Revolution of 1910–1917
Tetisheri	c. 1650 BC	Egypt	Hatshepsut	Mother of the New Kingdom. Phe was the designated Great Wife of Pharaoh Tao I Seqenenre and enjoyed many powers and privileges that other queens before her had not held. Born into a common family, she rose quickly to power through her marriage.
Thalestris	c. 325 BC	Asia Minor	Amazon	Amazon queen. She brought 300 Amazon women to Alexander the Great, hoping to breed a race of children as strong and intelligent as he.
The Furies	Mythical	Greece	Kali	The Roman goddesses of vengeance who killed Clytemnestra, among other tales. Seen as cruel, but fair in their punishments.
The Norns	Mythical	Norway	Kali	The Norse goddesses of fate: three sisters named Urd, Verdandi, and Skuld.
Theano	Flourished circa 550 BC	Ancient Greece	Aspasia	The pupil, and daughter or wife of Pythagoras. She directed Pythagoras's school after his death and is credited with writing the treatise on the Golden Mean.
Thecla	2nd century	Turkey	Saint Bridget	A saint of the early Christian Church, and a reported follower of Paul the Apostle.
Theoclea	flourished 6th century BC	Delphi in Ancient Greece	Aspasia	A Greek priestess, she was a tutor of the philosopher and mathematician Pythagoras.
Theodelinda	c. 570	Lombardy	Theodora	Queen of the Lombards; she played a major role in establishing Nicene Christianity in Lombardy and Tuscany.
Theodora III	980	Byzantine Empire	Theodora	A Byzantine Empress who was the last of the Macedonian dynasty that ruled the Byzantine Empire for almost two hundred years, she was co-empress with her sister Zoe and then sole empress.
Theodora the Senatrix	c. 870	Rome	Trotula	Theodora was a powerful Roman senatrix (female senator) during a period labeled the Pornocracy, or Rule of the Harlots (circa 904–963), by some later Roman Catholic scholars.
Theodora II	c. 815	Byzantine empire	Theodora	Byzantine empress during the reign of Theophilus (ruled 829–842). She was canonized after her death for reversing the policy of Iconoclasm (prohibition on the worship of icons).
Theresa of Avila	1515	Ávila, Spain	Hildegarde of Bingen	A mystic and a major figure in the Catholic Church, she is credited as a leader of the Counter Reformation and with reviving religious spirit in Spain.
Theroigne de Mericourt	1762	France	Mary Wollstonecraft	A French woman who was a predominant figure in the French Revolution. An eloquent speaker, she delivered fiery orations in clubs, before the National Assembly, and in the streets.
Thoma	Unknown; died 1127	Spain	Hrosvitha	Legal scholar and author of books on grammar.
Tiamat	Mythical	Babylonia	Primordial Goddess	The Chaos goddess in Babylonian mythology, Tiamat is a chaos monster, a primordial goddess of the salt water ocean, who mated with Abzû, the god of fresh water, to produce the first generation of deities.
Timarete	5th century BC	Ancient Greece	Sappho	An ancient Greek painter, the daughter of the painter Micon the Younger of Athens. According to Pliny the Elder, she "scorned the duties of women and practised her father's art." She is best known for a panel painting of the goddess of Diana that was kept at Ephesus.
Tituba	circa 1650	Massachusetts	Petronilla de Meath	Tituba was a 17th-century Carib Indian slave from Barbados or Guiana, belonging to Samuel Parris of Salem, Massachusetts. Tituba was one of the first three people accused of practicing witchcraft during the Salem witch trials which took place in 1692. Tituba confessed and implicated other women in the colony in order to save herself from execution. She was later sold by Parris and relocated outside of Salem.
Tiy	c. 1398 BC	Egypt	Hatshepsut	Queen of Egyptian pharaoh Amenhotep III. Her mummy was identified as The Elder Lady found in the Tomb of Amenhotep II. Amenhotep III seems to have relied on Tiy's political advice, being more interested in sports and the outdoors than in his pharaonic duties.
Tomyris	circa 530 BC	Central Asia	Boadaceia	A queen who reigned over the Massagetae, an Iranian people of Central Asia east of the Caspian Sea. She defeated the Persian king Cyrus II in war.
Tuchulcha	Mythical	Etruria	Kali	A half human, half donkey, daemon of the Etruscan underworld. She had a vulture's beak, wings, and hair made of serpents.
Tullia d'Aragona	c. 1510	Renaissance Italy	Isabella d'Este	An upper-class courtesan, author and philosopher, she published a Neoplatonic essay on the nature of love in which she insists on women's autonomy in romantic relationships.
Urraca	1187	Portugal	Trotula	Princess of Castile who married Afonso II of Portugal. She stood by Afonso during his ongoing civil war, as well as other conflicts, and guaranteed him the support of the Castilian royal family.
Ursley Kempe	c. 1525	England	Petronilla de Meath	An English woman accused of causing the death of three people and hanged for witchcraft.
Valada	1001	Córdoba, Spain	Hrosvitha	A poet during Córdoba's golden age under Islamic rule, she hosted a vibrant literary salon. Her father's death when she was at the age of thirty gave her a rich legacy which allowed her to live independently and flout many of the conventions imposed on women of her time. She composed satirical, often caustic verse, much of it dedicated to her lover, the poet Ibn Zaydún.
The Valkyries	Mythical	Germany	Kali	Minor female deities, dressed as warriors, who conducted the souls of the most heroic German warriors after their deaths, to join Odin's army.
Vashti	Biblical, flourished c. 450 BC	Persia	Judith	Vashti is mentioned in the Old Testament Book of Esther as the wife of King Ahasuerus of Persia. The king boasted to other men that his wife was the most beautiful and he ordered her to appear naked before them. Vashti refused and was consequently banished from his household and possibly beheaded. The king took Esther as his wife in her place.
Veleda	Flourished circa 50	North Germany	Boadaceia	A celebrated virgin prophet of the Bructeri, a tribe from northern Germany. In 69/70, she correctly prophesied the initial successes of the Batavian Rebellion against Roman rule.
Vera Figner	1852	Russia	Margaret Sanger	Russian revolutionary and narodnik born in Kazan. She was leader of Narodnaya Volya (the People's Will), a revolutionary socialist organization which aimed to depose the state regime through terrorism and was involved in the planning of several terrorist acts, including the assassination of Czar Alexander II in 1881.
Vera Zasulich	1849	Russia	Margaret Sanger	Russian Marxist writer and revolutionary. In 1883, she helped found the Liberation of Labor, the first Russian Marxist group. Later, she served on the editorial board of Iskra, a revolutionary Marxist newspaper. After the Russian Social Democratic Party split in 1903, Zasulich became a leader of the Menshevik faction.
Veronica Gambara	1485	Italy	Isabella d'Este	Italian poet, stateswoman and political leader. Married to the lord of Correggio, after his death in 1518 she took charge of the state as well as the education of her two children.
Vesta	Mythical	Rome circa 753 BC – AD 476	Sophia	The virgin goddess of the hearth, home, and family in Roman religion.
Victoria Woodhull	1838	United States	Susan B. Anthony	American leader of the woman's suffrage movement. She was a radical who advocated the eight-hour day, a progressive income tax, profit sharing, and social welfare programs. In 1872, she ran for president of the United States.
Vida Goldstein	1869	Australia	Susan B. Anthony	A pioneering Australian feminist politician who campaigned for women's suffrage and social reform. She stood for parliament five times, was a vocal opponent of capitalism, and a staunch pacifist, campaigning for peace during World War I.
Violante	c. 1365	France	Eleanor of Aquitaine	French noblewoman who married John I of Aragon and became queen of the medieval Iberian kingdom of Aragon. John's ill-health, meant she wielded considerable power on his behalf. She transformed the Aragonese court into a center of culture, especially cultivating Provençal troubadours.
Virgin Mary	Biblical, New Testament	Galilee	Eleanor of Aquitaine	Identified in the New Testament and in the Quran as the mother of Jesus who conceived through divine intervention. Revered for centuries as the feminine aspect of the divine.
Virginia	c. 465 BC	Rome	Sophia	Commonly known as Verginia, her honor killing by her father inspired political revolt in Rome which overthrew the decemviri ruling council and restored the republic.
Vita Sackville-West	1892	England	Virginia Woolf	Author, poet and gardener whose successful 50-year bisexual open marriage scandalised society.
Vittoria Colonna	1490	Italy	Isabella d'Este	Italian noblewoman and poet, considered the most influential woman of the Italian Renaissance and friend and muse to Michelangelo.
Wanda Landowska	1879	Polish, later naturalized French	Ethyl Smyth	Musical prodigy whose harpsichordist performances, teaching, recordings and writings played a large role in reviving the popularity of the harpsichord in the early 20th century.
Wetamoo	c. 1635	Wampanoag people, Rhode Island	Sacajawea	Native American noblewoman whose life was recorded in the children's historical novel series, The Royal Diaries
Willa Cather	1873	United States	Virginia Woolf	American author who is famous for her novels of frontier life on the Great Plains.
Witch of Endor	c. 1000 BC	Kingdom of Israel	Judith	A woman seer who called up the ghost of the recently deceased prophet Samuel, at the demand of King Saul.
Xochitl	c. 11th century	Mesoamerica	Sacajawea	Toltec Queen from 990 to 1040. She helped forge the Toltec state and legend says she died in battle.
Yekaterina Breshkovskaya	1844	Russia	Margaret Sanger	Russian socialist revolutionary nicknamed The "Babushka" (Little Grandmother) of the Russian Revolution.
Yekaterina Dashkova	1743	Russia	Mary Wollstonecraft	The closest female friend of Empress Catherine the Great and a major figure of the Russian Enlightenment. One of the best educated women of her time.
Yolanda of Aragon	1384	France	Isabella d'Este	Chicago's description fits Yolande of Aragon, an important figure in French history who supported Joan of Arc's army financially.
Yvette	1158	Belgium	Hildegarde of Bingen	A religious figure and prophet in the town of Huy, Belgium
Zenobia	240	Palmyrene Empire	Boadaceia	Queen of the breakaway Palmyrene Empire in Roman Syria. She led a revolt against Rome expanding her empire, by conquering Egypt and expelling the Roman prefect. She ruled over Egypt until 274, when she was defeated and taken as a hostage to Rome by the Emperor Aurelian.
Zipporah	c. 1500 BC	Hebrew	Judith	Zipporah or Tzipora is described in the Book of Exodus as the wife of Moses. She came to Moses' aid by speedily circumcising their son at a critical juncture.
Siva	Mythical	Russia	Primordial Goddess	Slavic goddess of life, love, and fertility. She was worshipped in Russia, Poland, Czech Republic, Slovakia, Slovenia, and Germany under the names Siwa, Sieba, Razivia, Zhiva.
Zoe	c. 978	Constantinople	Theodora	Reigned as co-empress of the Byzantine Empire with her sister Theodora from April 19 to June 11, 1042.
Zora Neale Hurston	1891	United States	Sojourner Truth	Harlem Renaissance writer both celebrated and castigated for her flamboyant wit and iconoclastic style, She was thirty-five years old before making a start in her literary career.
