= Readex =

Distributor of digital media

Readen
- Parent company: NewsBank
- Founder: Albert Boni
- Country of origin: United States
- Headquarters location: Naples, Florida
- Publication types: microfilm, databases
- Nonfiction topics: primary sources
- Official website: www.readex.com

Readex, a division of NewsBank, publishes collections of primary source research materials.

== History ==
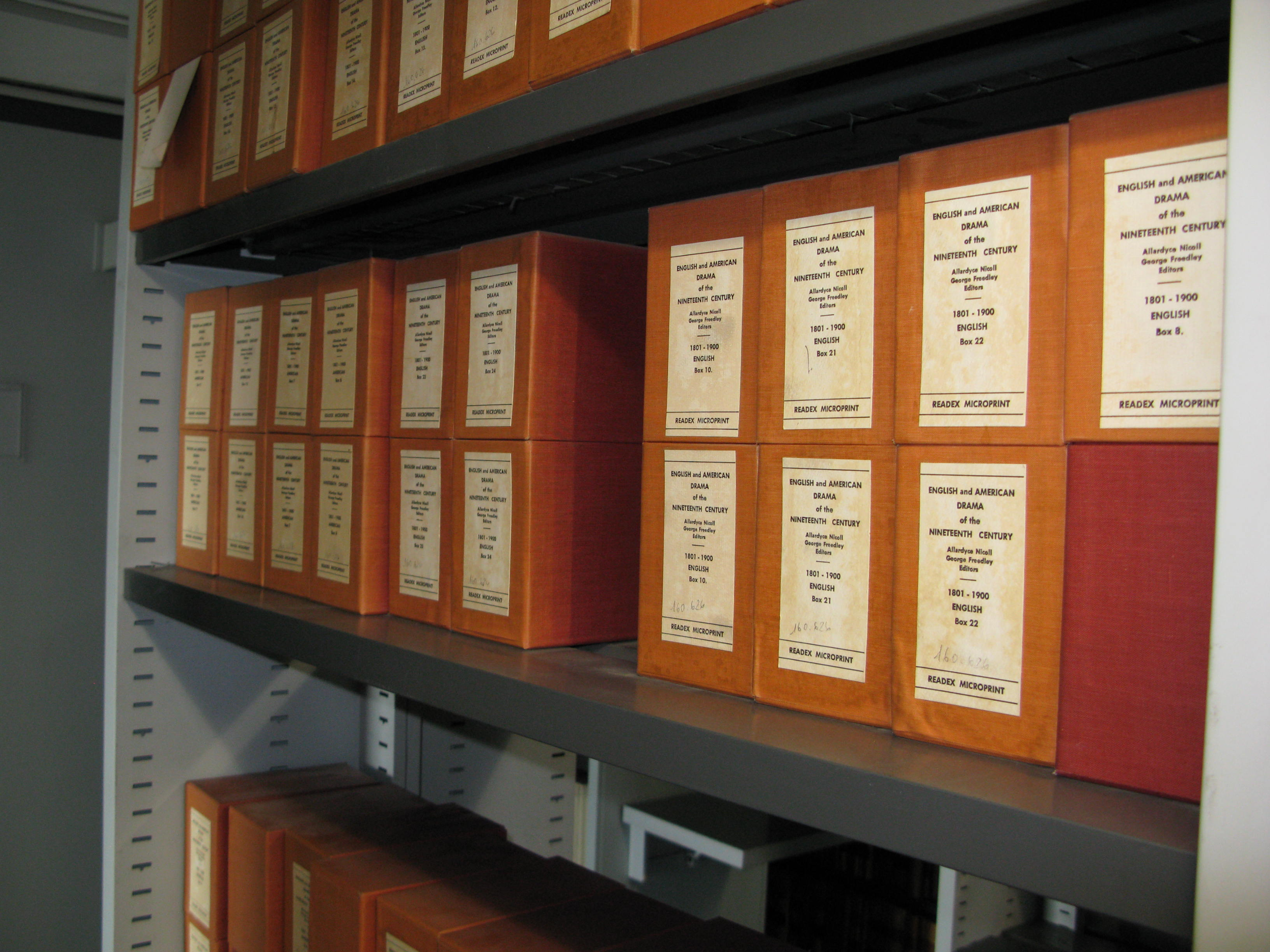
Boxes of English and American Drama of the 19th Century at Bordeaux Montaigne University library.

In 1950, publisher Albert Boni, co-founder of the Modern Library, formed the Readex Microprint Corporation in New York City. Some of the companies Readex partnered with early on included the American Antiquarian Society and the Library of Congress. Early printing projects included the “British House of Commons Sessional Papers”, the “Early American Imprints, 1639-1800”, and the “English and American Drama of the 19th Century”.

In 1983, Readex was acquired by NewsBank. Since the acquisition, the company has been known primarily as NewsBank.

In the 2000s, several collections became available in searchable digital editions.

Partnerships formed in the 2000s with the Library of Congress, Dartmouth College Library, University of Vermont Libraries, and the United States Senate Library led to publication of digital editions of the American State Papers and the United States Congressional Serial Set.

In 2006, Readex launched America's Historical Newspapers, which includes Early American Newspapers, 1690-1922, and American Ethnic Newspapers.

In 2007, Readex announced a Web-based edition of the Foreign Broadcast Information Service (FBIS) Daily Reports, 1941-1996—the record of political and historical open-source intelligence for the United States government. Also developed was a digital edition of Joint Publications Research Service (JPRS) Reports, 1957-1994.

In 2008, Readex announced a partnership with the Center for Research Libraries to launch an online World Newspaper Archive.

== Collections ==
More recent collections created in partnership with the American Antiquarian Society include The American Civil War Collection, 1860-1922; The American Slavery Collection, 1820-1922; and Caribbean Newspapers, 1718-1876. Also part of America’s Historical Imprints is American Pamphlets, 1820-1922: From the New-York Historical Society.

The latter includes Ethnic American Newspapers from the Balch Collection, 1799-1971, published in partnership with the Historical Society of Pennsylvania; Hispanic American Newspapers, 1808-1980, published in partnership with the University of Houston, and African American Newspapers, 1827-1998, created from repositories including the Wisconsin Historical Society and the Kansas Historical Society, and African American Newspapers, 1835-1956. Subject-specific newspaper collections include American Business: Agricultural Newspapers; American Business: Mercantile Newspapers; American Gazettes: Newspapers of Record; American Politics: Campaign Newspapers; and American Religion: Denominational Newspapers.

Collections include historical newspapers published in Africa, Latin America and South Asia between 1800 and 1922. Readex has created digital supplements to its Early American Imprints collections, featuring newly discovered materials from the Library Company of Philadelphia and the American Antiquarian Society.

Readex announced two major collections with a focus on African American history, literature, and culture. The first collection, African American Periodicals, 1825-1995, was drawn from holdings of the Wisconsin Historical Society and is based on James Danky's African-American Newspapers and Periodicals: A National Bibliography. The second collection, Afro-Americana Imprints, 1535-1922, was created from the Library Company of Philadelphia’s large collection, and includes 12,000 books, pamphlets and broadsides. Available from the Afro-Americana Imprints collection are smaller collections titled African History and Culture, Black Authors, and Caribbean History and Culture.

== Products ==
- Archive of Americana
  - America's Historical Newspapers
    - Early American Newspapers
    - Ethnic American Newspapers
    - Caribbean Newspapers
  - America's Historical Imprints
    - Afro-Americana Imprints
    - American Pamphlets
    - American Broadsides and Ephemera
    - American Civil War Collection, The
    - American Slavery Collection, The
    - Early American Imprints (based on Charles Evan's American Bibliography and Shaw-Shoemaker's American Bibliography)
  - America's Historical Government Publications
    - American State Papers
    - United States Congressional Serial Set
  - African American Periodicals
  - The Civil War: Antebellum Period to Reconstruction
- International Studies
  - Twentieth-Century Global Perspectives
  - World Newspaper Archive
  - Foreign Broadcast Information Service Daily Reports
  - Joint Publications Research Service Reports
  - United Nations
- Microform
