= NewsBank =

News database resource

NewsBank Inc.
- Formation: 1972
- Founder: John Naisbitt
- Merger of: Readex
- Type: Corporation
- Legal status: Active
- Headquarters: Naples, Florida, United States
- Region served: United States; Canada
- Services: News database and educational archive resource
- Official language: English
- President and CEO: John McDowell
- Website: newsbank.com

NewsBank Inc. is a US-based commercial company founded in 1972 that operates a global news database resource providing online archives of media publications as reference materials to libraries. As of 2024 it includes current and archived information from thousands of newspapers, videos, broadcast transcripts, journals, and other publications.

== History ==
John Naisbitt, the author of the book Megatrends, founded NewsBank. The company was launched in 1972. NewsBank was bought from Naisbitt by Daniel S. Jones, who subsequently became its president. Naisbitt left NewsBank in 1973. In 1983, NewsBank acquired Readex. With the completion of the merger, NewsBank had acquired one of the earliest organizations in America to archive microform.

The company's headquarters in 1986 was in New Canaan, Connecticut. In that year, NewsBank had 100 in-house employees, while another 100 employees worked from home and traveled to the company's headquarters, bringing back newspapers to their residence from there, and then coming back to the company with indexed information on these publications.

Chris Andrews was brought on in 1986 as product manager for CD-ROM. His job was to help the company transition from a paper format of delivery to libraries, so that its indexes and full-text articles were available in CD-ROM format. The subscription price for this service initially was US$5,000 per library. Visitors to libraries found that their search time was cut from 30 minutes using paper indexes to five minutes using CD-ROM. NewsBank used an arbitrary selection process for determining which news articles the company considered worthy for archiving; it based their selection on articles that were more likely to be widely appealing to a larger potential audience of future researchers, not simply stories of regional interest.

In 1992, NewsBank had difficulty providing its users with a method to search for information based upon a specific location. Newspaper results were listed by subject matter first and then subsequently by location. At the time, it indexed articles via microfiche from more than 400 media publications in the US. The company announced in 1993 a CD-ROM product indexing full text of 35 publications including The Christian Science Monitor, The Washington Post, Los Angeles Times, The Dallas Morning News, Chicago Tribune, The Boston Globe, and The Atlanta Journal-Constitution.

In 1994, NewsBank was the only company providing researchers access to an index to periodical literature in the subject of theater, with its NewsBank's Review of the Arts: Performing Arts on CD-ROM.

It started compiling the full text of articles related to the local economy of geographic areas and providing this information via CD-ROM to its clients in 1994. The privately held company was cited by The Information Advisor as bringing in annual revenue of approximately $19 million, and employing a staff of 350 people. By 1998, NewsBank provided indexes via CD-ROM to newspaper articles from over 450 cities in the United States.

In 2001, NewsBank compiled the Foreign Broadcast Information Service index and made it available via CD-ROM. NewsBank joined forces with Micromedia, Ltd., a division of IHS Canada, to help distribute its products in 2001. In 2004 NewsBank maintained archival access to hundreds of media references since 1996. In 2005, NewsBank was structured in a pay-for-use format, with access differentiated for different types of users including public libraries, public schools, as well as higher education settings.

In 2011 NewsBank reached an agreement with The Daily Northwestern newspaper of Northwestern University to archive all of its historical publications. The task archived more than 90,000 pages of material from the school. It included a plan to archive not just The Daily Northwestern but also prior related publications from 1871 to 2000, and index the material so it could be keyword searchable on the Internet. Dan Jones, President and CEO of NewsBank, had a prior relationship with the university, serving as a university trustee and president-elect of the Northwestern Alumni Association.

== Coverage ==
In 2013, NewsBank provided users with its service Access World News, which according to Reference Skills for the School Librarian was then the "world's largest full-text news database". In 2014 NewsBank contained over 990 news sources, covering U.S. state as well as national publications, along with television and radio programs.

NewsBank's offerings include a "Black Life in America" archive.

As of 2024, NewsBank holds current and archived information from thousands of newspapers, along with newswires, blogs, videos, broadcast transcripts, journals, government documents, and other publications. It is a global resource, providing online resources to many regions.

The National Library of Australia, along with many state and university libraries in Australia, provide online access to NewsBank. As of 2024 the resource holds over 760 Australian sources, both national and regional, with coverage for most titles starting in the 1980s, 1990s or 2000s.

== Location and people ==
NewsBank headquarters are in Naples, Florida, U.S., and it also has an office in Mitcham North, Melbourne, Australia.

Dan Jones is the founding president, while the CEO is John McDowell. Dan Jones's son, Danny (1972–2024), was the consumer division's first president, and largely responsible for growing GenealogyBank, while his daughters have also worked for the organization.

== See also ==
- GenealogyBank.com
- LexisNexis
- Westlaw
