= Shaw and Shoemaker (bibliography) =

American imprints, 1801–1846

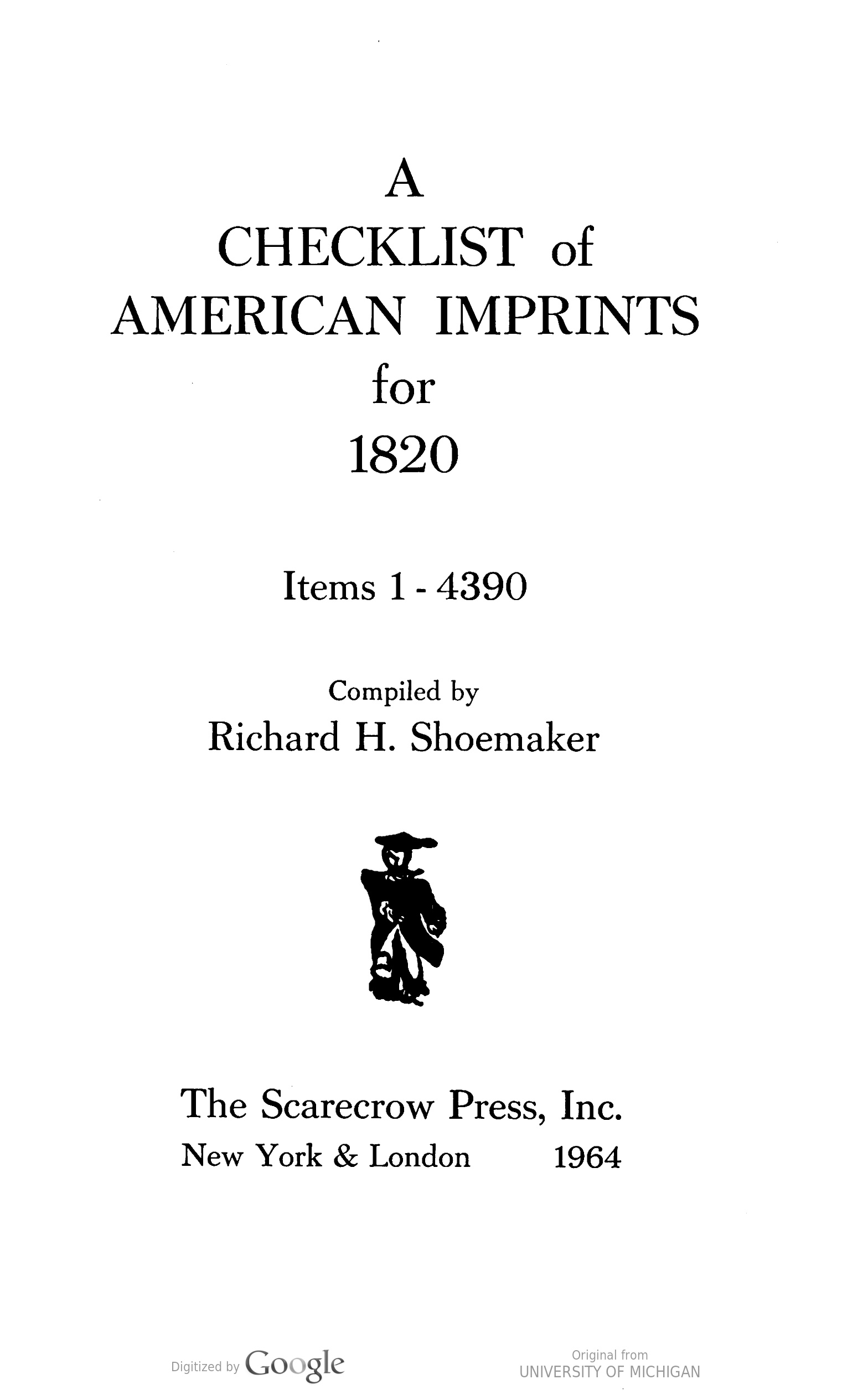
Title page for A CHECKLIST of AMERICAN IMPRINTS for 1820, Items 1-4390, compiled by Richard H. Shoemaker, published by The Scarecrow Press (1964)

Shaw and Shoemaker is the short name for a bibliography of early American imprints that was created by Ralph R. Shaw and Richard H. Shoemaker. Their series American Bibliography: A Preliminary Checklist described published "advertisements, allegories, almanacs, autobiographies, ballads, campaign literature, diaries, elegies, eulogies, hymns, imaginary voyages, jestbooks, novels, plays, poems, prayer books, primers, sermons, songs, textbooks, travel literature" printed in the United States from 1801 to 1846.

== Description ==
Ralph Shaw and Richard H. Shoemaker were 20th-century bibliophiles and archivists who met at the Rutgers University library school. Their series continues chronologically after the Short-Title Evans bibliography, created as Early American Imprints by Charles Evans, which describes American imprints from 1639 to 1800. The original printed publication of Shaw and Shoemaker appeared in 22 volumes, covering works from 1801–1819. Shoemaker later continued with the ten-volume Checklist of American Imprints for 1820–1829. By 2005 the series contained entries covering the time period from 1801 to 1846, printed in 56 volumes.

The printed bibliography became the framework for Early American Imprints Series II, 1801–1819, a microfiche series and a digital database of images of the included titles. Titles included in this work are often referred to in library catalogs or other bibliographies with the word Shaw or Shoemaker and number associated with their entry in the list.

Per the Bibliographic Standards Committee of the Rare Books and Manuscripts Section of the American Library Association the current recommended citation format for Shaw (the 1801 to 1819 list) is Shaw, R.R. American bibliography, which replaced Shaw & Shoemaker (646). The current recommended citation format for Shoemaker (the 1820 to 1829 list) is Shoemaker, R.H. Checklist of American imprints for 1820–1829, which replaced Shoemaker (648).
