= MTU/Pratt & Whitney RTF-180 =

The MTU/Pratt & Whitney RTF-180 was a planned turbofan aircraft engine that was to be jointly developed by Motoren-und Turbinen Union (MTU) and Pratt & Whitney in the early 1990s. It was to be the first civil engine program where MTU would be the prime contractor. The name of the engine, RTF-180, combined the initials for "Regional TurboFan" with the engine's nominal thrust of 18,000 pounds-force (80 kilonewtons).

A November 1990 internal briefing showed that the RTF-180 was one of the engines on offer for the 90-115 seat MPC 75, a regional airliner requiring 14,000–18,000 lbf (62–80 kN) of static thrust. In March 1991, the RTF-180 engine was proposed as a possible powerplant for an 80-130 seat airliner from a consortium of Germany's Deutsche Aerospace (DASA), France's Aérospatiale, and Italy's Alenia. The design of the RTF-180 for that airliner initially included a 137-centimeter diameter (54-inch) fan, three-stage low-pressure compressor, eight-stage high-pressure compressor, one-stage high-pressure turbine, and four-stage low-pressure turbine.

At the 1993 Paris Air Show, MTU and Pratt & Whitney announced that they would abandon the RTF-180 in favor of a joint project with General Electric and SNECMA.

== Specifications ==
Data from Regioliner R92 aircraft definition note, 22 July 1992, pages 4–10, 4–11, and 4–14

==== General characteristics ====
- Type: 2-spool turbofan
- Length: 4,132 mm (163 in)
- Fan diameter: 1.3 m (52 in)
- Diameter:
- Dry weight:

==== Components ====
- Compressor: 6-stage high-pressure (HP) compressor, 2-stage transonic low-pressure (LP) compressor
- Combustors: Annular double-dome combustion chamber
- Turbine: 1-stage cooled HP turbine, 3-stage LP turbine

==== Performance ====
- Maximum thrust: 62–89 kN (6,400–9,100 kgf; 14,000–20,000 lbf)
- Bypass ratio: 5.0
- Specific fuel consumption: Cruise at Mach 0.77 (822 km/h; 511 mph), altitude 11,000 m (35,000 ft): 18.4 g/(kN⋅s) (0.648 lb/(lbf⋅h))

== Bibliography ==
- Thomalla, Volker K. (February 1992). "Regioplane consortium to develop 80-130-seat passenger liner". West Europe: Aerospace. Science & Technology: Europe. JPRS Report. Translated by Foreign Broadcast Information Service (published 27 March 1992). Flug Revue. pp. 5–7.
- Betts, Paul (21 February 1992). "UK-German group in aero-engine talks with MTU". World Trade News. Financial Times. No. 31690. p. 5. ISSN 0307-1766.
- "BMW, Rolls-Royce design domestic jet engine". West Europe: Aerospace. Science & Technology: Europe. JPRS Report. Translated by Foreign Broadcast Information Service (published 25 October 1991). Der Spiegel. 5 August 1991. pp. 6–7.
