= Early American Imprints =

Readex database

Early American Imprints is a digital and microopaque card (not the more common microfiche) collection produced by Readex. It is based on Charles Evan's (1850–1935) American Bibliography. Ralph R. Shaw (1907–72) and Richard Shoemaker's (1907–70) collaborative efforts continued American Bibliography. American Bibliography contains the full text of all known existing books, pamphlets, and broadsides printed in the United States (or British American colonies prior to Independence) from 1639 through 1819, some 72,000 titles. It is now also available in electronic form as part of the Readex Archive of Americana.

== History ==
The microprint edition was undertaken by the American Antiquarian Society in 1955 and edited by Clifford K. Shipton, then director of the Society. The extensive collection of early American imprints in the Society's library provided a substantial number of the imprints that were filmed. Many other major libraries in the United States and Europe also made texts available and provided editorial corrections to the original bibliographic work of Charles Evans. The series is available in two parts:

- Early American Imprints: Series I Evans, 1639–1800,
- Early American Imprints: Series II Shaw-Shoemaker, 1801–1819

== Library Holdings ==
=== United States ===
Many major research libraries, and some public libraries hold the series, including:

- Harvard University
- Library of Congress See: American Imprint Collection
- Columbia University
- Cornell
- New York Public Library
- Arizona State University
- Wayne State University

The only library in the USA able to print from microopaque card to paper is at University of Missouri.

=== United Kingdom ===
- The British Library
- Cambridge University Library
- National Library of Scotland
- Vere Harmsworth Library, University of Oxford

== See also ==
- Books in the United States
