= 1867 California gubernatorial election =

- September 4, 1867
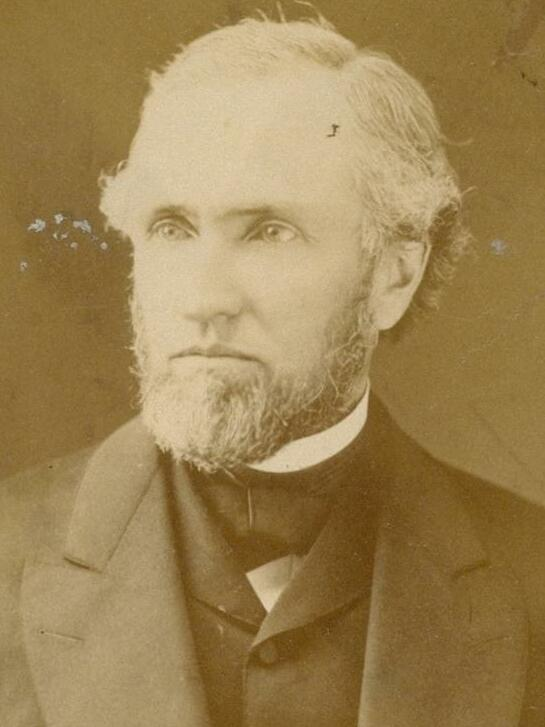

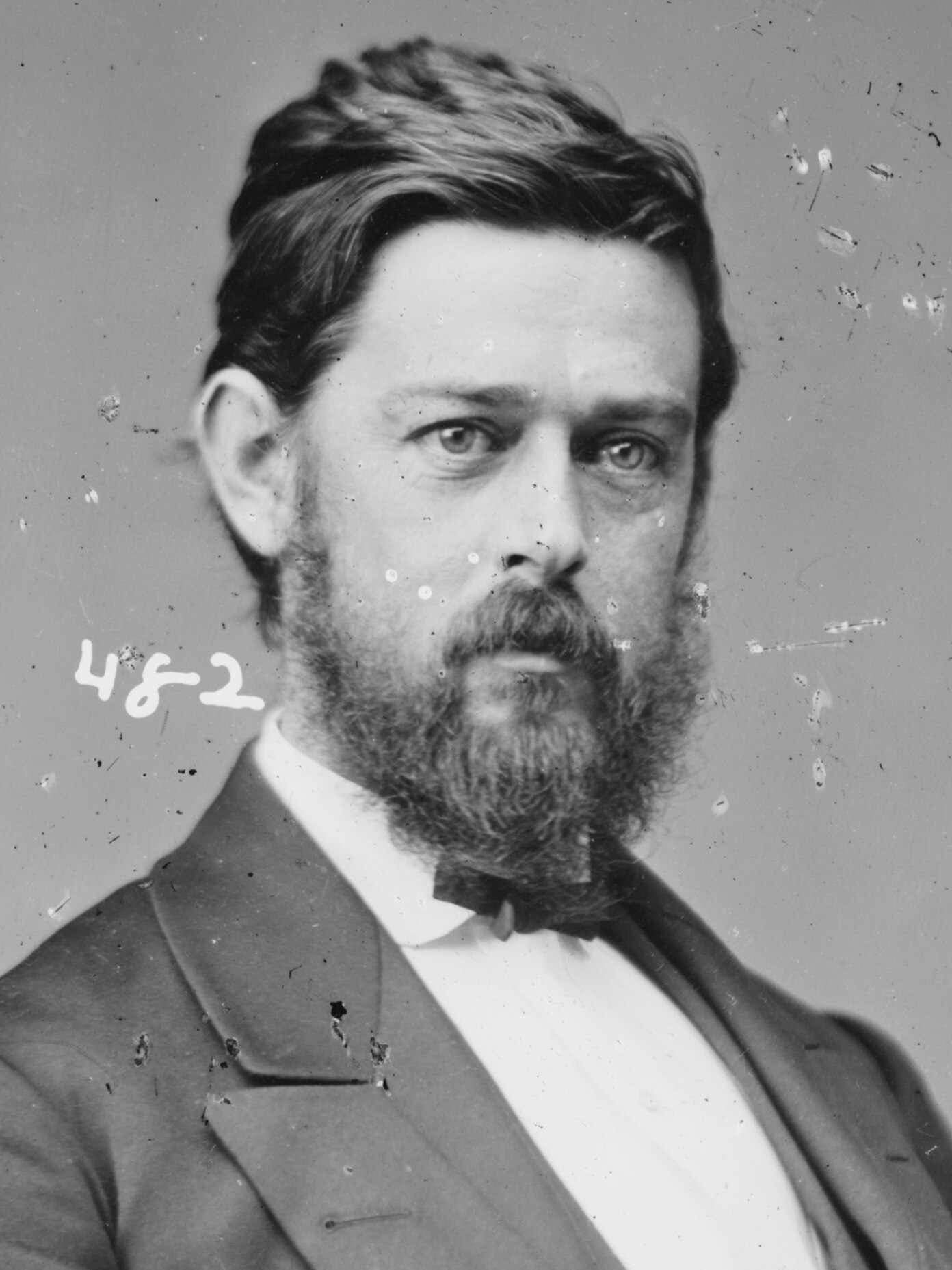
Nominee	Henry Huntly Haight	George Congdon Gorham
Party	Democratic	National Union
Popular vote	49,905	40,359
Percentage	54.04%	43.70%
County results
Haight
40–50%
50–60%
60–70%
70–80%
80–90%
Gorham
40–50%
50–60%
60–70%
Governor before election
Frederick Low
National Union
Elected Governor
William Irwin
Democratic

The 1867 California gubernatorial election was held on September 4, 1867, to elect the governor of California. The election pitted Democrat Henry Haight against National Unionist George Gorham. Congressman John Bidwell had also sought the National Union nomination, but lost due to his anti-monopoly stance. Haight Defeated Gorham by slightly over ten points. Republicans opposed to Gorham, who had support from pre-war Unionist Democrats, ran an alternate Republican ticket headed by Caleb T. Fay.

== Results ==
Caleb T. Fay, the Independent Republican in the race

California gubernatorial election, 1867
Party	Candidate	Votes	%	±%
Democratic	Henry Huntly Haight	49,905	54.04%	+13.06%
National Union	George Congdon Gorham	40,359	43.70%	−15.32%
Independent Republican	Caleb T. Fay	2,088	2.26%	
Majority		9,546	10.34%	
Total votes		92,352	100.00%	
Democratic gain from National Union		Swing	+28.39%	

=== Results by county ===
County	Henry H. Haight Democratic		George C. Gorham National Union		Caleb T. Fay Independent Republican		Margin		Total votes cast
County	#	%	#	%	#	%	#	%	Total votes cast
Alameda	1,092	45.82%	1,266	53.13%	25	1.05%	-174	-7.30%	2,383
Alpine	106	38.27%	149	53.79%	22	7.94%	-43	-15.52%	277
Amador	1,358	55.14%	1,076	43.69%	29	1.18%	282	11.45%	2,463
Butte	1,148	53.45%	882	41.06%	118	5.49%	266	12.38%	2,148
Calaveras	1,380	51.86%	1,250	46.97%	31	1.16%	130	4.89%	2,661
Colusa	544	70.47%	197	25.52%	31	4.02%	347	44.95%	772
Contra Costa	599	44.73%	719	53.70%	21	1.57%	-120	-8.96%	1,339
Del Norte	178	53.94%	150	45.45%	2	0.61%	28	8.48%	330
El Dorado	1,835	51.88%	1,579	44.64%	123	3.48%	256	7.24%	3,537
Fresno	325	87.37%	47	12.63%	0	0.00%	278	74.73%	372
Humboldt	393	37.04%	657	61.92%	11	1.04%	-264	-24.88%	1,061
Inyo	105	51.98%	95	47.03%	2	0.99%	10	4.95%	202
Kern	385	70.13%	164	29.87%	0	0.00%	221	40.26%	549
Klamath	215	60.39%	136	38.20%	5	1.40%	79	22.19%	356
Lake	508	69.12%	221	30.07%	6	0.82%	287	39.05%	735
Lassen	103	37.05%	162	58.27%	13	4.68%	-59	-21.22%	278
Los Angeles	989	57.43%	727	42.22%	6	0.35%	262	15.21%	1,722
Marin	344	39.77%	515	59.54%	6	0.69%	-171	-19.77%	865
Mariposa	835	57.75%	599	41.42%	12	0.83%	236	16.32%	1,446
Mendocino	898	63.42%	512	36.16%	6	0.42%	386	27.26%	1,416
Merced	255	82.79%	52	16.88%	1	0.32%	203	65.91%	308
Mono	101	44.49%	117	51.54%	9	3.96%	-16	-7.05%	227
Monterey	544	56.55%	414	43.04%	4	0.42%	130	13.51%	962
Napa	750	52.45%	655	45.80%	25	1.75%	95	6.64%	1,430
Nevada	2,283	49.81%	2,176	47.48%	124	2.71%	107	2.33%	4,583
Placer	1,590	46.85%	1,672	49.26%	132	3.89%	-82	-2.42%	3,394
Plumas	708	46.79%	781	51.62%	24	1.59%	-73	-4.82%	1,513
Sacramento	2,141	49.93%	1,677	39.11%	470	10.96%	464	10.82%	4,288
San Bernardino	426	64.55%	234	34.45%	0	0.00%	192	29.09%	660
San Diego	179	68.58%	82	31.42%	0	0.00%	97	37.16%	261
San Francisco	10,571	61.13%	6,363	36.79%	360	2.08%	4,208	24.33%	17,294
San Joaquin	1,592	48.61%	1,668	50.93%	15	0.46%	-76	-2.32%	3,275
San Luis Obispo	177	41.45%	242	56.67%	8	1.87%	-65	-15.22%	427
San Mateo	355	45.22%	427	54.39%	3	0.38%	-72	-9.17%	785
Santa Barbara	301	49.34%	309	50.66%	0	0.00%	-8	-1.31%	610
Santa Clara	2,031	52.37%	1,839	47.42%	8	0.21%	192	4.95%	3,878
Santa Cruz	703	44.75%	868	55.25%	0	0.00%	-165	-10.50%	1,571
Shasta	512	46.50%	541	49.14%	48	4.36%	-29	-2.63%	1,101
Sierra	698	39.89%	955	54.57%	97	5.54%	-257	-14.69%	1,750
Siskiyou	985	55.87%	744	42.20%	34	1.93%	241	13.67%	1,763
Solano	1,228	50.89%	1,155	47.87%	30	1.24%	73	3.03%	2,413
Sonoma	2,565	61.06%	1,625	38.68%	11	0.26%	940	22.38%	4,201
Stanislaus	451	67.01%	219	32.54%	3	0.45%	232	34.47%	673
Sutter	660	53.31%	555	44.83%	23	1.86%	105	8.48%	1,238
Tehama	373	53.13%	326	46.44%	3	0.43%	47	6.70%	702
Trinity	444	46.06%	509	52.80%	11	1.14%	-65	-6.74%	964
Tulare	618	70.55%	255	29.11%	3	0.34%	363	41.44%	876
Tuolumne	1,350	55.46%	1,068	43.88%	16	0.66%	282	11.59%	2,434
Yolo	796	54.15%	573	38.98%	101	6.87%	223	15.17%	1,470
Yuba	1,178	49.31%	1,155	48.35%	56	2.34%	23	0.96%	2,389
Total	49,905	54.04%	40,359	43.70%	2,088	2.26%	9,546	10.34%	92,352

==== Counties that flipped from National Union to Democratic ====
- Amador
- Butte
- Calaveras
- Del Norte
- El Dorado
- Klamath
- Mendocino
- Monterey
- Napa
- Nevada
- Sacramento
- San Francisco
- Santa Clara
- Siskiyou
- Solano
- Sutter
- Tehama
- Yolo
- Yuba
