= United States Senate Committee on Rules and Administration =

Standing committee of the United States Senate

Senate Rules and Administration Committee
Standing committee
- Active United States Senate; 119th Congress

History
- Formed: December 9, 1874

Leadership
- Chair: Mitch McConnell (R); Since January 3, 2025
- Ranking Member: Alex Padilla (D); Since January 3, 2025

Structure
- Political parties: Majority (9): Republican (9); Minority (8): Democratic (8)

Jurisdiction
- Policy areas: Books, manuscripts and monuments to the memory of individuals, Congressional office buildings, Congressional Record, Corrupt practices, Credentials and qualifications of members of the Senate, Federal elections generally, Government Publishing Office, meetings of the Congress and attendance of members, Presidential succession, Senate library, statuary and works of art in the Capitol, Smithsonian Institution, Standing Rules of the United States Senate, United States Botanic Garden
- Oversight authority: Architect of the Capitol, Congressional Research Service, FEC, EAC, GPO, Historian of the United States Senate, Library of Congress, Parliamentarian of the United States Senate, Secretary of the Senate, Sergeant at Arms of the United States Senate, Smithsonian Institution, United States Botanic Gardens, United States Senate Curator, United States Senate Library
- House counterpart: House Administration Committee; House Rules Committee

Website
- https://www.rules.senate.gov/

Rules
- Rule XXV.1.(n), Standing Rules of the Senate

The Senate Committee on Rules and Administration, also called the Senate Rules and Administration Committee, is responsible for the rules of the United States Senate, administration of congressional buildings, and with credentials and qualifications of members of the Senate, including responsibility for contested elections. The committee is not as powerful as its House counterpart, the House Committee on Rules, as it does not set the terms of debate for individual legislative proposals, since the Senate has a tradition of open debate. Some members of the committee are also ex officio members of the Joint Committee on the Library and the Joint Committee on Printing.

== History ==
The Committee was first created as the Select Committee to Revise the Rules of the Senate on December 3, 1867. On December 9, 1874, it became a standing committee.

On January 2, 1947, its name was changed to the Committee on Rules and Administration, and it took over the functions of the following committees:

- Committee to Audit and Control the Contingent Expenses of the Senate
- Committee on Education and Labor (functions were later transferred to Health, Education, Labor, and Pensions Committee)
- Committee on Enrolled Bills
- Committee on Privileges and Elections

== Jurisdiction ==
In accordance of Rule XXV of the United States Senate, all proposed legislation, messages, petitions, memorials, and other matters relating primarily to the following subjects is referred to the Senate Rules Committee:

1. Administration of the Senate Office Buildings and the Senate wing of the Capitol, including the assignment of office space;
2. Congressional organization relative to rules and procedures, and Senate rules and regulations, including floor and gallery rules;
3. Corrupt practices;
4. Credentials and qualifications of Members of the Senate, contested elections, and acceptance of incompatible offices;
5. Federal elections generally, including the election of the President, Vice President, and Members of the Congress;
6. Nominations to fill a vacancy in the Vice Presidency;
7. Government Printing Office, and the printing and correction of the Congressional Record, as well as those matters provided for under rule XI;
8. Meetings of the Congress and attendance of Members;
9. Payment of money out of the contingent fund of the Senate or creating a charge upon the same (except that any resolution relating to substantive matter within the jurisdiction of any other standing committee of the Senate shall be first referred to such committee);
10. Presidential succession;
11. Purchase of books and manuscripts and erection of monuments to the memory of individuals;
12. Senate Library and statuary, art, and pictures in the Capitol and Senate Office Buildings;
13. Services to the Senate, including the Senate restaurant; and,
14. United States Capitol and congressional office buildings, the Library of Congress, the Smithsonian Institution (and the incorporation of similar institutions), and the Botanic Gardens.

The Senate Rules Committee is also charged:

1. To make a continuing study of the organization and operation of the Congress of the United States and shall recommend improvements in such organization and operation with a view toward strengthening the Congress, simplifying its operations, improving its relationships with other branches of the United States Government, and enabling it better to meet its responsibilities under the Constitution of the United States;
2. To identify any court proceeding or action which, in the opinion of the Committee, is of vital interest to the Congress as a constitutionally established institution of the Federal Government and call such proceeding or action to the attention of the Senate; and,
3. To develop, implement, and update as necessary a strategic planning process and a strategic plan for the functional and technical infrastructure support of the Senate and provide oversight over plans developed by Senate officers and others in accordance with the strategic planning process.

== Members, 119th Congress ==
Majority	Minority
Mitch McConnell, Kentucky, Chair; Ted Cruz, Texas; Shelley Moore Capito, West Virginia; Roger Wicker, Mississippi; Deb Fischer, Nebraska; Cindy Hyde-Smith, Mississippi; Bill Hagerty, Tennessee; Katie Britt, Alabama; John Boozman, Arkansas	Alex Padilla, California, Ranking Member; Chuck Schumer, New York; Mark Warner, Virginia; Amy Klobuchar, Minnesota; Jeff Merkley, Oregon; Jon Ossoff, Georgia; Michael Bennet, Colorado; Peter Welch, Vermont

== Committee leadership ==
Former chairs and ranking members are listed below.

=== Chairs ===
==== Select Committee to Revise the Rules of the Senate, 1867–1874 ====
Name	Party	State	Start	End
Henry Anthony	Republican	Rhode Island	1867	1871
Samuel Pomeroy	Republican	Kansas	1871	1873
Thomas Ferry	Republican	Michigan	1873	1874

==== Committee on Rules, 1874–1947 ====
Name	Party	State	Start	End
Thomas Ferry	Republican	Michigan	1874	1877
James Blaine	Republican	Maine	1877	1879
John Morgan	Democratic	Alabama	1879	1881
William Frye	Republican	Maine	1881	1887
Nelson Aldrich	Republican	Rhode Island	1887	1893
Joseph Blackburn	Democratic	Kentucky	1893	1895
Nelson Aldrich	Republican	Rhode Island	1895	1899
John Spooner	Republican	Wisconsin	1899	1907
Philander Knox	Republican	Pennsylvania	1907	1909
Murray Crane	Republican	Massachusetts	1909	1913
Lee Overman	Democratic	North Carolina	1913	1919
Philander Knox	Republican	Pennsylvania	1919	1921 (Note: Died in office.)
Charles Curtis	Republican	Kansas	1921 (Note: Selected for position intra-term.)	1929
George Moses	Republican	New Hampshire	1929	1933
Royal Copeland	Democratic	New York	1933	1936
Matthew Neely	Democratic	West Virginia	1936	1941
Harry Byrd	Democratic	Virginia	1941	1947

==== Committee on Rules and Administration, 1947–present ====
Name	Party	State	Start	End
Wayland Brooks	Republican	Illinois	1947	1949
Carl Hayden	Democratic	Arizona	1949	1953
William Jenner	Republican	Indiana	1953	1955
Theodore Green	Democratic	Rhode Island	1955	1957
Thomas Hennings	Democratic	Missouri	1957	1960
Mike Mansfield	Democratic	Montana	1960	1963
Everett Jordan	Democratic	North Carolina	1963	1973
Howard Cannon	Democratic	Nevada	1973	1978
Claiborne Pell	Democratic	Rhode Island	1978	1981
Charles Mathias	Republican	Maryland	1981	1987
Wendell Ford	Democratic	Kentucky	1987	1995
Ted Stevens	Republican	Alaska	1995 (Note: Resigned from the position intra-term to take the chairmanship of the Senate Governmental Affairs Committee, amid turnover caused by Bob Packwood's resignation from the Senate.)	
John Warner	Republican	Virginia	1995	1999
Mitch McConnell	Republican	Kentucky	1999	2001
Chris Dodd	Democratic	Connecticut	2001 (Note: At the beginning of the 107th Congress in January 2001 the Senate was evenly divided. With a Democratic president and vice president still serving until January 20, the vice president was available to break ties, and the Democrats thus controlled the Senate for 17 days, from January 3 to January 20. On January 3 the Senate adopted S.Res. 7, designating Democratic senators as committee chairs to serve during this period and Republican chairs to serve effective at noon on January 20, 2001.)	
Mitch McConnell	Republican	Kentucky	2001	
Chris Dodd	Democratic	Connecticut	2001 (Note: On June 6, 2001, the Democrats took control of the Senate after Jim Jeffords switched from the Republican Party to Independent and announced that he would caucus with the Democrats.)	2003
Trent Lott	Republican	Mississippi	2003	2007
Dianne Feinstein	Democratic	California	2007	2009
Chuck Schumer	Democratic	New York	2009	2015
Roy Blunt	Republican	Missouri	2015	2017
Richard Shelby	Republican	Alabama	2017	2018 (Note: Resigned from the position intra-term to take the chairmanship of the Senate Appropriations Committee, after Thad Cochran resigned from the Senate.)
Roy Blunt	Republican	Missouri	2018	2021
Amy Klobuchar	Democratic	Minnesota	2021	2025
Mitch McConnell	Republican	Kentucky	2025	present

=== Ranking members ===
==== Select Committee to Revise the Rules of the Senate, 1867–1874 ====
Name	Party	State	Start	End
Vacant			1867	1871
Thomas Bayard	Democratic	Delaware	1871	1873
Augustus Merrimon	Democratic	North Carolina	1873	1874

==== Committee on Rules, 1874–1947 ====
Name	Party	State	Start	End
Augustus Merrimon	Democratic	North Carolina	1874	1879
James Blaine	Republican	Maine	1879	1881
Wilkinson Call	Democratic	Florida	1881	1883
Isham Harris	Democratic	Tennessee	1883	1893
Nelson Aldrich	Republican	Rhode Island	1893	1895
Joseph Blackburn	Democratic	Kentucky	1895	1897
Isham Harris	Democratic	Tennessee	1897	
Arthur Gorman	Democratic	Maryland	1897	1899
Henry Teller	Democratic	Colorado	1899	1907
Augustus Bacon	Democratic	Georgia	1907	1913
Francis Warren	Republican	Wyoming	1913	1915
Jacob Gallinger	Republican	New Hampshire	1915	1918
Francis Warren	Republican	Wyoming	1918	1919
Lee Overman	Democratic	North Carolina	1919	1930
Pat Harrison	Democratic	Mississippi	1930	1931
Joseph Robinson	Democratic	Arkansas	1931	1933
Frederick Hale	Republican	Maine	1933	1941
Arthur Vandenberg	Republican	Michigan	1941	1947

==== Committee on Rules and Administration, 1947–present ====
Name	Party	State	Start	End
Carl Hayden	Democratic	Arizona	1947	1949
Kenneth Wherry	Republican	Nebraska	1949	1951
Henry Lodge	Republican	Massachusetts	1951	1953
Carl Hayden	Democratic	Arizona	1953	1955
William Jenner	Republican	Indiana	1955	1957
Carl Curtis	Republican	Nebraska	1957	1971
Winston Prouty	Republican	Vermont	1971	
Ted Stevens	Republican	Alaska	1971	1972 (Note: Resigned from the committee intra-term to fill a seat on the Senate Appropriations Committee.)
Marlow Cook	Republican	Kentucky	1972	1974 (Note: Resigned from the Senate.)
Mark Hatfield	Republican	Oregon	1975	1981
Wendell Ford	Democratic	Kentucky	1981	1987
Ted Stevens	Republican	Alaska	1987	1995
Wendell Ford	Democratic	Kentucky	1995	1999
Chris Dodd	Democratic	Connecticut	1999	2001
Mitch McConnell	Republican	Kentucky	2001	
Chris Dodd	Democratic	Connecticut	2001	
Mitch McConnell	Republican	Kentucky	2001	2003
Chris Dodd	Democratic	Connecticut	2003	2007
Bob Bennett	Republican	Utah	2007	2011
Lamar Alexander	Republican	Tennessee	2011	2013
Pat Roberts	Republican	Kansas	2013	2015
Chuck Schumer	Democratic	New York	2015	2017
Amy Klobuchar	Democratic	Minnesota	2017	2021
Roy Blunt	Republican	Missouri	2021	2023
Deb Fischer	Republican	Nebraska	2023	2025
Alex Padilla	Democratic	California	2025	present

== Historical committee rosters ==
=== 118th Congress ===
Majority	Minority
Amy Klobuchar, Minnesota, Chair; Dianne Feinstein, California (until September 29, 2023); Chuck Schumer, New York; Mark Warner, Virginia; Jeff Merkley, Oregon; Alex Padilla, California; Jon Ossoff, Georgia; Michael Bennet, Colorado; Peter Welch, Vermont; Laphonza Butler, California (October 17, 2023–December 8, 2024); Adam Schiff, California (from December 10, 2024)	Deb Fischer, Nebraska, Ranking Member; Mitch McConnell, Kentucky; Ted Cruz, Texas; Shelley Moore Capito, West Virginia; Roger Wicker, Mississippi; Cindy Hyde-Smith, Mississippi; Bill Hagerty, Tennessee; Katie Britt, Alabama

=== 117th Congress ===
Majority	Minority
Amy Klobuchar, Minnesota, Chair; Dianne Feinstein, California; Chuck Schumer, New York; Mark Warner, Virginia; Patrick Leahy, Vermont; Angus King, Maine (Note: Angus King is an independent who caucuses with the Democrats.); Jeff Merkley, Oregon; Alex Padilla, California; Jon Ossoff, Georgia	Roy Blunt, Missouri, Ranking Member; Mitch McConnell, Kentucky; Richard Shelby, Alabama; Ted Cruz, Texas; Shelley Moore Capito, West Virginia; Roger Wicker, Mississippi; Deb Fischer, Nebraska; Cindy Hyde-Smith, Mississippi; Bill Hagerty, Tennessee

=== 116th Congress ===
Majority	Minority
Roy Blunt, Missouri, Chair; Mitch McConnell, Kentucky; Richard Shelby, Alabama; Pat Roberts, Kansas; Lamar Alexander, Tennessee; Ted Cruz, Texas; Shelley Moore Capito, West Virginia; Roger Wicker, Mississippi; Deb Fischer, Nebraska; Cindy Hyde-Smith, Mississippi	Amy Klobuchar, Minnesota, Ranking Member; Dianne Feinstein, California; Chuck Schumer, New York; Dick Durbin, Illinois; Tom Udall, New Mexico; Mark Warner, Virginia; Patrick Leahy, Vermont; Angus King, Maine; Catherine Cortez Masto, Nevada

=== 115th Congress ===
Majority	Minority
Roy Blunt, Missouri, Chair (from April 10, 2018); Thad Cochran, Mississippi (until April 1, 2018); Mitch McConnell, Kentucky; Richard Shelby, Alabama, Chair (until April 10, 2018); Pat Roberts, Kansas; Lamar Alexander, Tennessee; Ted Cruz, Texas; Shelley Moore Capito, West Virginia; Roger Wicker, Mississippi; Deb Fischer, Nebraska; Cindy Hyde-Smith, Mississippi	Amy Klobuchar, Minnesota, Ranking Member; Dianne Feinstein, California; Chuck Schumer, New York; Dick Durbin, Illinois; Tom Udall, New Mexico; Mark Warner, Virginia; Patrick Leahy, Vermont; Angus King, Maine; Catherine Cortez Masto, Nevada

Source: "U.S. Senate Committee on Rules and Administration". Senate rules committee website.

=== 114th Congress ===
Majority	Minority
Roy Blunt, Missouri, Chair; Mitch McConnell, Kentucky; Thad Cochran, Mississippi; Pat Roberts, Kansas; Lamar Alexander, Tennessee; Richard Shelby, Alabama; Ted Cruz, Texas; Shelley Moore Capito, West Virginia; John Boozman, Arkansas; Roger Wicker, Mississippi	Chuck Schumer, New York, Ranking Member; Dianne Feinstein, California; Dick Durbin, Illinois; Tom Udall, New Mexico; Mark Warner, Virginia; Patrick Leahy, Vermont; Amy Klobuchar, Minnesota; Angus King, Maine

Source: 2013 Congressional Record, Vol. 159, Page S296 to 297
