= John S. Richards =

American librarian (1892–1979)

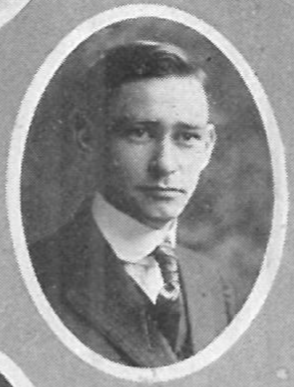

President of the American Library Association
- In office 1955–1956
- Preceded by: Lawrence Quincy Mumford
- Succeeded by: Ralph R. Shaw

Personal details
- Born: February 16, 1892 Chicago, Illinois, US
- Died: December 3, 1979 (aged 87) Seattle, Washington, US
- Education: University of Washington
- Occupation: Librarian

John S. Richards (February 16, 1892 – December 3, 1979) was director of the Seattle Public Library and served as the president of the American Library Association from 1955 to 1956.

== Early life and career ==
John Stewart Richards was born February 16, 1892, in Chicago, Illinois. His family moved to the Pacific Northwest when he was four years old, and he grew up in Yakima Valley. In 1912 Richards began his studies at the University of Washington; under the tutelage of University Librarian William E. Henry, Richards studied library science and became the first alumnus to graduate from the University of Washington Library School with an A.B. degree in 1916.

His first job as a librarian was at the Marshfield Public Library from September 1916 to February 1918.

In 1918, during World War I, Richards served as a librarian in the Library War Service at Camp Fremont.

He subsequently held a number of librarian jobs, including positions at the Idaho Technology Institute from 1920 to 1923, the Washington State Normal School from 1923 to 1926, the University of California, Berkeley Library from 1926 to 1934, and the University of Washington Library from 1934 to 1942.

Richards became the head librarian of the Seattle Public Library in 1942. Throughout his time at Seattle Public Library, he urged Seattle citizens to provide greater funding for the library, especially after the Carnegie-built Central Library was damaged and seriously weakened by an April 1949 earthquake; finally, in 1956, Seattle voters approved a $5 million library bond to replace the structure. Richards also strengthened the Seattle Friends of the Libraries group, with regular discussions geared towards community needs. During the McCarthy era, Richards noticed a list of "dangerous" books being distributed within the library; he argued that this attempt at censorship must be recognized for "the gangsterism that it is and must be combatted."

After retiring from Seattle Public Library in 1957, Richards taught at the University of Washington Library School and served on the Washington State Library Commission from 1959 to 1964. He moved to Carmel, California in 1964 and died during a visit to Seattle on December 3, 1979.

== Library leadership ==
Richards served as a consultant for libraries throughout the Pacific Northwest and urged cooperation among libraries, enacting many cooperative innovations via the Pacific Northwest Library Association, especially during his time as PNLA president from 1937 to 1938. He was the president of the American Library Association's Division of Public Libraries (later renamed the Public Library Association) from 1949 to 1950.

Richards served as president of the American Library Association from 1955 to 1956. He spent much time representing ALA in congressional committee meetings; during his term, the Library Services Act was passed into law, funding public libraries in rural areas.

Non-profit organization positions
Preceded by L. Quincy Mumford	President of the American Library Association; 1955–1956	Succeeded by Ralph R. Shaw
