= United States Congressional Serial Set =

Collection of documents

The United States Congressional Serial Set began in 1817 as the official collection of reports and documents of the United States Congress. The collection was published in a "serial" fashion, hence its name. It has been described as the "nation's most treasured publication" and beloved by librarians as "part of their most valued holdings."

== Overview ==
The Serial Set does not normally include the text of congressional debates, bills, resolutions, hearings, committee prints, and publications from congressional support agencies such as the Government Accountability Office and the Congressional Budget Office. Proceedings of the Congress are published in the Congressional Record, while committee hearings and prints in most cases are published separately through the Government Printing Office (GPO). However, by special order, some 300 selected committee hearings were included, especially in the 19th and early 20th centuries." Coverage for the period 1789 to 1817 is via the separate compilation American State Papers, which consists of 38 volumes.

It is common for a volume of the Serial Set to be composed of a combination of documents and reports. Some of these reports may be one to two pages in length, while others can be hundreds of pages long. Although congressional in name, there are thousands of executive branch publications (e.g., the Annual Report of the Secretary of War and Official Records of the American Civil War) included within its pages.

The 14,000 bound volumes have often been neglected by researchers due to weak indexing and limited distribution. Volumes of the Serial Set have been sent to federal depository libraries over the years by the GPO, but many such depositories hold only a partial collection of the set for a variety of reasons (e.g., age of the depository). Also, House Report 104-657 directed that distribution be limited to regional depositories plus certain others designated by Congress (beginning with the volumes covering the 105th Congress and commencing with v.14388). An exception are Serial Set volumes judged to be key Congressional publications by GPO, thus receiving distribution to all depository libraries.

Virginia Saunders, the longest serving employee at the Government Printing Office, dedicated most of her 64 years of federal employment to binding and proofreading the Congressional Serial Set. Saunders died June 19, 2009.

== Non-print format availability ==
In the late 1980s the Congressional Information Service issued the Serial Set, along with its predecessor American State Papers, through 1969 (v.1-12880) on microfiche; the entire set constituted about 117,000 fiches. CIS also issued a 56-volume hardcover comprehensive index to both series covering 1789-1969, for the first time providing access to their contents via multiple points (subject, name, bill number, etc.) including the many maps they contain.

LexisNexis and Readex both undertook digitization efforts to convert the text of American State Papers and the Serial Set to electronic format. LexisNexis completed their efforts in late 2006 (covering 1789-1969). LexisNexis rescanned the maps in the set via a partnership with the University of Maryland, College Park. On November 30, 2010 Reed Elsevier the parent company of LexisNexis, completed the sale of the CIS and UPA product lines (which includes the digital Serial Set) to ProQuest. Readex used original Serial Set volumes from Baker-Berry Library at Dartmouth College to create digital images of every publication through 1994, including approximately 56,000 maps. Additional Serial Set materials not available from Dartmouth are provided by the United States Senate Library, Middlebury College, the Vermont State Library and the University of Vermont.

In 2007, Google Books began to scan the Serial Set. In October 2018, HeinOnline released the U.S. Congressional Serial Set in the form of a searchable database.

In 2019, the Government Publishing Office and the Law Library of Congress announced plans to digitize the entire run of the Congressional Serial Set back to 1817 and make the documents available for free online. The agencies said the project would "take at least a decade to complete."

== Numbering ==
Research has confirmed in some cases volume numbers were assigned to particular titles that were never published or appeared in later volumes. GPO has issued a list of Assigned Serial Numbers Not Used.

== Citation ==
A bibliographic citation such as "35th Congress, 2nd Session, House Miscellaneous Document #43 Claims of citizens of Territory of Kansas" (or the equivalent shorthand version "35th-2nd H.misdoc 43") will be found in the Serial Set.
