= Lawrence Quincy Mumford =

American librarian and 11th Librarian of Congress

Quincy Mumford
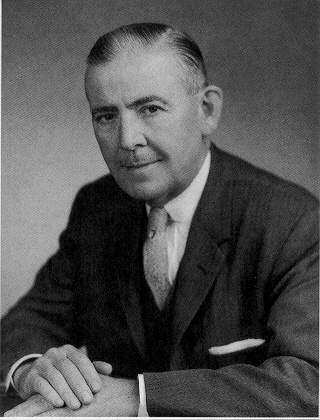

Librarian of Congress
- In office September 1, 1954 – December 31, 1974
- President: Dwight D. Eisenhower; John F. Kennedy; Lyndon B. Johnson; Richard Nixon; Gerald Ford
- Preceded by: Verner W. Clapp (acting)
- Succeeded by: John Lorenz (acting)

President of the American Library Association
- In office 1954–1955
- Preceded by: Flora Belle Ludington
- Succeeded by: John S. Richards

Personal details
- Born: Lawrence Quincy Mumford; December 11, 1903 Hanrahan, North Carolina, U.S.
- Died: August 15, 1982 (aged 78) Washington, D.C., U.S.
- Resting place: Oak Hill Cemetery
- Education: Duke University (BA, MA); Columbia University (BLIS)

Lawrence Quincy Mumford (11 December 1903 – 15 August 1982) was an American librarian. He was the eleventh Librarian of the United States Congress from 1954 to 1974.

== Biography ==
Mumford was born near Ayden, North Carolina to Jacob Edward Mumford, a tobacco farmer, and Emma Luvenia Stocks. He grew up working the farm alongside his 10 siblings when he was not in school. He attended Grifton High School where he excelled in debate winning school and district honors. Mumford also participated in school athletics where he played baseball and tennis.

Upon graduation, Mumford was granted a tuition scholarship to attend Trinity College in Durham, North Carolina; his educational goal focused on preparing for a teaching career. At Trinity College, Mumford followed the lead of his brother Grover and joined the Hesperian Society. As a member he continued to be active in debate, winning several distinguished awards for excellence in public speaking and debate. In addition to his oratory skills, Mumford began to hone his leadership skills in the society and over his undergraduate career eventually became president of the Hesperian Society. Outside of the society, Mumford participated in the Physics Club, Phi Beta Kappa, and acted in two dramatic productions on top of working in the library as a student assistant. He graduated magna cum laude in 1925.

Duke University Librarian Joseph Penn Breedlove offered Mumford a full-time position and he accepted so that he could continue to work towards a master's degree that would help with his dreams of a teaching career. Mumford completed his Master's in English in the spring of 1928, but was at this point persuaded by assistant librarian Louis T. Ibbotson to go back to school and get a Bachelor of Library Science degree at the Columbia University School of Library Service in New York.

In the fall of 1928, Mumford entered the School of Library Science, where he was able to work part-time in the library proper while completing his education. In the spring of 1929, he was offered a position with the New York Public Library (NYPL) as a reference assistant.

Mumford spent 16 years with the New York Public Library. Starting as a reference assistant, he soon rose to take on more administrative duties. Advancing from reference to general administrative assistant, he then became chief of the cataloguing division. After a short loan to the Library of Congress where he overhauled their processing department, he returned to take up duties as the chief of preparations and ended up as the coordinator of general public services before he left in 1945 to join the Cleveland Public Library system (CPL).

Mumford spent five years as assistant director of the CPL and became director in 1950. He was director until 1954 when he took on the helm of Librarian of Congress. His time spent at the CPL can be marked by improved growth (financially and physically) and increased public awareness and support.

In addition to his duties at the NYPL and CPL, Mumford joined the American Library Association in 1932 and became increasingly active in the association. His efforts with various ALA committees and his work with the Film Council of America and the Great Books Foundation led to his nomination and selection as President of the American Library Association in 1954. His inaugural address to ALA clearly speaks of his commitment to Library Service:

The task ahead is to offer the opportunity for continuing education through life, to enlarge the means of access to books through an ever-broadening pattern of facilities and services. The task ahead is to provide the materials and resources of education for better living, to help people to become more proficient in their chosen fields of work, balanced and enriched in their private lives, to the end that they may bring their skills and humanity to the service of society as a whole.

We should not lose sight of the fact that maintaining man's right to knowledge and freedom to choose his reading is an empty achievement if we do not make available to him the material from which he can select and choose ... Freedom to read is an academic right, important as a principle, but meaningless in effect unless library resources are made available to those who lack them.

Mumford spent a year as ALA President and during this time helped to streamline management of the association and oversaw the establishment of the Laura Ingalls Wilder Award for substantial and lasting contributions to literature for children.

== Librarian of Congress ==
National Union Catalog, Pre-1956 imprints- L-R: John Commander, Mansell Information Publishing; Gordon R. Williams, Chair, American Library Association, Committee on the National Union Catalog; L. Quincy Mumford, Librarian of Congress, 1954-1974; Johannes L. Dewton, editor of National Union Catalog, Pre-1956 Imprints at symposium held January 27-28, 1981, at the Library of Congress, sponsored by the Center for the Book.

Two months after Mumford's inauguration as president of the ALA, he began his 20-year tenure as the second professionally trained Librarian of Congress. Mumford was nominated by President Dwight D. Eisenhower on April 22, 1954, and was confirmed by the Senate on July 29, 1954. He was sworn into office using the 1782 Aiken Bible (the first complete bible printed in English in the independent United States) and officially began his first day on September 1, 1954.

The years prior to Mumford's appointment reveal hampered library relationships with the United States Congress; appropriations were down and Congress felt that the Library of Congress was no longer serving its needs. In addition, new information and technology were placing ever-growing demands on the services of the library.

As Librarian of Congress, Mumford was able to use his oratorical skills to repair vital relationships, rebuild Congressional confidence in the library and gain much needed appropriations to improve functions and programming. During the first ten years of his appointment appropriations more than doubled, the case for more space (a new building) was developed and put before the Joint Committee on the Library, work was started in the development of cataloging in publication and research was completed on machine-readable cataloging systems; Public Law 480 was established and helped bring about international cataloging standards.

During the last half of his Librarianship, Mumford saw much of his effort and many of the programs he had implemented come to fruition. The most notable being the construction of the James Madison Memorial Building that was started in 1971 and completed in 1980. Other achievements include a ninefold total increase in appropriations, the establishment of the National Program for Acquisitions and Cataloging (NPAC), completion and distribution of the Machine-Readable Cataloging (MARC) system, an increase in services for handicapped readers, expansion of legislative research into the more dedicated Congressional Research Service, final publication of the Pre-1956 National Union Catalog, completion of the Presidential Papers Program, development of preservation programs and the establishment of the Preservation Research Laboratory, the expansion of motion picture programs, the addition of an African section and a Children's Book section, development of National Referral Center for Science and Technology, the establishment of the American Revolution Bicentennial Office and the development of the Affirmative Action Plan that provided for equality, training and scholarship of Library of Congress staff.

== Personal life ==
Mumford met Permelia Catherine Stevens, a children's librarian for the NYPL system, and they were married on October 4, 1930, and had one child, a daughter, Katheryn Mumford. Permelia died in 1961.

Mumford later married Mrs. Betsy Perrin Fox on November 28, 1969.

Mumford died on August 15, 1982, in Washington, D.C. He was buried in Oak Hill Cemetery.

== Notes ==
Non-profit organization positions
Preceded by Flora Belle Ludington	President of the American Library Association; 1954–1955	Succeeded by John S. Richards
Government offices
Preceded by Verner W. Clapp; Acting	Librarian of Congress; 1954–1974	Succeeded by John Lorenz; Acting
