= Hamilton Library =

Library at the University of Hawaiʻi at Mānoa

Coordinates: 21°18′2″N 157°48′58″W

- Location: Honolulu, Hawaii
- Type: Public research library
- Established: 1908

Other information
- Parent organization: University of Hawaiʻi at Mānoa
- Website: manoa.hawaii.edu/library

Thomas Hale Hamilton Library is the academic library of the University of Hawaiʻi at Mānoa and the largest research library in the state of Hawai‘i. The library opens to the public.

The library was designed by George Hogan, an architect known for designing many homes on the island, including Plantation Estate (the Winter White House during the Barack Obama presidency).

== List of directors ==
- Caroline (Carrie) P. Green 1907 to 1908 - Acting Librarian 1908 to 1912
- Elizabeth Bryan 1913 to 1919
- Clara Hemenway 1919 to 1928
- Mary Pringle 1926 to 1928 - Acting Librarian
- Mary Pringle 1928 to 1943
- Carl G. Stroven 1943 to 1966
- Ralph R. Shaw (Appointed as Dean of Library Activities) 1966 to 1969
- Stanley West 1969 to 1977
- Donald L. Bosseau 1977 to 1982
- Robert Stevens April to August 1982 - Acting Librarian
- Ira Harris August to December 1982 - Acting Librarian
- John R. Haak 1983 to 2000
- Jean H. Ehrhorn, Interim University Librarian July 2000 to December 2001
- Diane Perushek 2001 to 2006,
- Paula Mochida, Interim University Librarian, January 2006 to December 2011
- Gregg Geary, Interim University Librarian, January 2012 to July 2013
- Irene Herold, University Librarian, August 2013 to June 2017
- Monica Ghosh, Interim University Librarian, June 2017 to December 2019
- Clement "Clem" Guthro, University Librarian, January 2020 to Present

== See also ==
- Association of Public and Land-grant Universities
