= Ralph R. Shaw =

American librarian and publisher

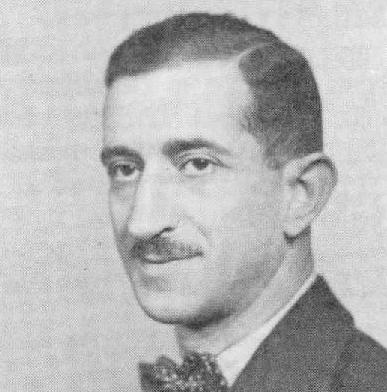
- Shaw in 1974

President of the American Library Association
- In office 1956–1957
- Preceded by: John S. Richards
- Succeeded by: Lucile M. Morsch

Personal details
- Born: Ralph Robert Shaw; May 18, 1907 Detroit, Michigan, USA
- Died: October 14, 1972 (aged 65)
- Spouses: Viola Susan Leff (m. 1929); Mary McChesney Andrews (m. 1969)
- Education: Adelbert College Western Reserve University; Columbia University; University of Chicago
- Occupation: Librarian

Ralph Robert Shaw (May 18, 1907 – October 14, 1972) was a librarian, a publisher, and an innovator in library science. In 1999, American Libraries named him one of the "100 Most Important Leaders We Had in the 20th Century". He was awarded the Melvil Dewey Medal in 1953 and American Library Association Honorary Membership in 1971.

== Career and education ==
Ralph Shaw had his first job in a library at the age of 16 when he worked as a page at the Cleveland Public Library. He obtained his BA in 1928 from the Adelbert College Western Reserve University and then subsequently a library science bachelor's degree from the library school at Columbia University in 1929.

He then went on to obtain his master's degree from the library school at Columbia University in 1931 and his PhD from the University of Chicago Graduate Library School in 1950. By the time Shaw had earned his PhD he had already served as senior assistant and chief bibliographer of the Engineering Society's Library, served as the director of the Gary Public Library in Indiana, and had been appointed the director of the U.S. National Agricultural Library in 1940.

United States National Agricultural Library - (1940–1954)

Shaw served as the department librarian for the United States National Agricultural Library (NAL) from 1940 to 1954. Shaw's personal project was to mechanize the bibliography and citation process of the Agricultural Library, creating more efficient means of searching and referencing information.

Rutgers University - Faculty 1954, Dean 1959-1961

In his role as Rutgers faculty Shaw worked on the second revision of American Bibliography, working with Richard H. Shoemaker to complete its entries through the year 1846.

University of Hawaii – 1964–1969

Shaw was the Dean of Library Activities 1966 to 1969 at the Hamilton Library at the University of Hawaii at Manoa.

== Scarecrow Press ==
Ralph Shaw founded a publishing company called the Scarecrow Press in 1950 in the basement of his Alexandria, Virginia home, "assisted only by his wife Viola". Shaw wanted to establish a publishing company that would publish scholarly and academic work, unlikely to capture the attention from most companies that were more concerned with making money than the distribution of scholarly ideas. He started the Scarecrow Press with "author and editor Earl Schenk Miers". The website for the company describes how the company name came out of this idea that this new company was not concerned with making money. "Shaw knew that costs would have to be kept in control because he envisioned publishing scholarly books that were intellectually important, yet economically marginal. As Shaw described a company that would avoid excessive office costs, excessive editorial costs, general trade advertising, and the building up a staff, Miers broke in, saying, "You're talking about a scarecrow: it has no overhead, it pays no rent, it is not responsible for anybody's future clothing and shelter. It's a scarecrow!"

Kenneth F. Kister, in his biography of Eric Moon describes Shaw as "dynamic…a polymath who had more irons in the fire than any librarian since Melvil Dewey". And Moon himself, considered a "radical" in the library world, had once warned a researcher that "interviewing Ralph Shaw in the morning was like having "six martinis for breakfast". Eventually, Moon replaced Shaw as chief editor of Scarecrow press as he faced his battle with cancer and treatment and they had conflicts in the interim. Scarecrow was sold to Grolier in 1969. The company still publishes for the academic community. It "was purchased in 1995 by University Press of America and moved from its Metuchen, New Jersey, headquarters to Lanham, Maryland, where it is now a member of the Rowman & Littlefield Publishing Group".

== Innovations and inventions ==
Ralph Shaw was said to have been "anti-machine" when it came to libraries. But through the administrative advances and use of technology, Shaw "adapted and invented machines to do library work" because "by completing routine tasks of librarianship more efficiently, machines could enable professional librarians to devote more time to the intellectual aspects of their work". Shaw's work with machines also led him to pioneer discussions of conflicts within Library Science spurred by technology. As a dedicated bibliographer, Shaw noted that bibliography traditionally focused upon the physical aspects of an item or on its method of production. Shaw noted however that as Library Science progressed bibliography placed increasing emphasis upon the intellectual content of a work, which required different conceptual frames to process and eventually would require different organizational methods.

=== Bookmobile ===
While he was the director at the public library in Gary, Indiana, Shaw "purchased small house trailers, redesigned their interiors, and transported them with a single truck cab to specified stations throughout Gary on a regular schedule". This version of the bookmobile saved more money than the "door-to-door deliveries" version that was in place previously.

=== Transaction card charging ===
Also, while at the library in Gary, Shaw improved the process by which libraries tracked books that were overdue. It used to be that many librarians, when books were returned, were having to look through cards, to find the date due and identify late returns. Transaction cards were placed in books and were "numbered in serial order" by date so when books were returned, any missing books prompted a late notice.

=== Photo-Clerk ===
The Photo-Clerk was used in the transaction card charging system to make copies of the due date cards. Shaw also experimented with the Photo-Clerk at the Department of Agriculture Library.

=== Rapid selector ===
The rapid selector was a device used to quickly search microfilm. Vannevar Bush had developed the "microfilm storage and information retrieval device that he expanded - in theory, anyway - with his plans for the 'Memex' machine, a futuristic device that foreshadowed the modern computer and hypertext linking". "With Dr. Bush's permission, Ralph used his concepts to develop a more effective and commercially viable machine", however, "nothing ever came of the Rapid Selector".

== Personal life ==
He married his first wife Viola Susan Leff in 1929 and married his second wife, Mary McChesney Andrews in 1969.

== See also ==
- Shaw and Shoemaker (bibliography)

== Additional references ==
- Hines, Theodore C. (1975). "Shaw and the Machine". In Stevens, Norman D. (ed.). Essays for Ralph Shaw. Metuchen, N.J.: Scarecrow Press. pp. 7–14. ISBN 0-8108-0815-3.
- Kent, Allen, Harold Lancour, and Jay Elwood Daily. "Shaw, Ralph Robert." Encyclopedia of Library and Information Science:. 27. CRC Press, 1979
- Martin, Lowell. "A Tribute To Ralph Shaw." Essays For Ralph Shaw. Ed. Norman D. Stevens. Metuchen, NJ: The Scarecrow Press, 1975.

Non-profit organization positions
Preceded by John S. Richards	President of the American Library Association; 1956–1957	Succeeded by Lucile M. Morsch
