= George Congdon Gorham =

American politician (1832–1909)

- Portrait by Brady, c. 1868–1879

6th Secretary of the United States Senate
- In office June 6, 1868 – March 24, 1879
- Preceded by: John Weiss Forney
- Succeeded by: John Christopher Burch

Personal details
- Born: July 5, 1832 Greenport, New York, U.S.
- Died: February 11, 1909 (aged 76) Washington, D.C., U.S.
- Party: Democratic (before 1862, after 1896); National Union (1862–1868); Republican (1862–1896)
- Spouse(s): Sarah Ann Hills (m. 1853; died 1875) Effie Bassett (m. 1876)
- Children: 8
- Relatives: John Howland; John Tilley; Elizabeth Tilley; John Gorham; Joseph Gorham

George Congdon Gorham (July 5, 1832 – February 11, 1909) was an American clerk, newspaper editor, politician and author who served as secretary of the United States Senate from 1868 to 1879, during most of the Reconstruction era. He was the unsuccessful National Union Party nominee for Governor of California in 1867.

== Biography ==
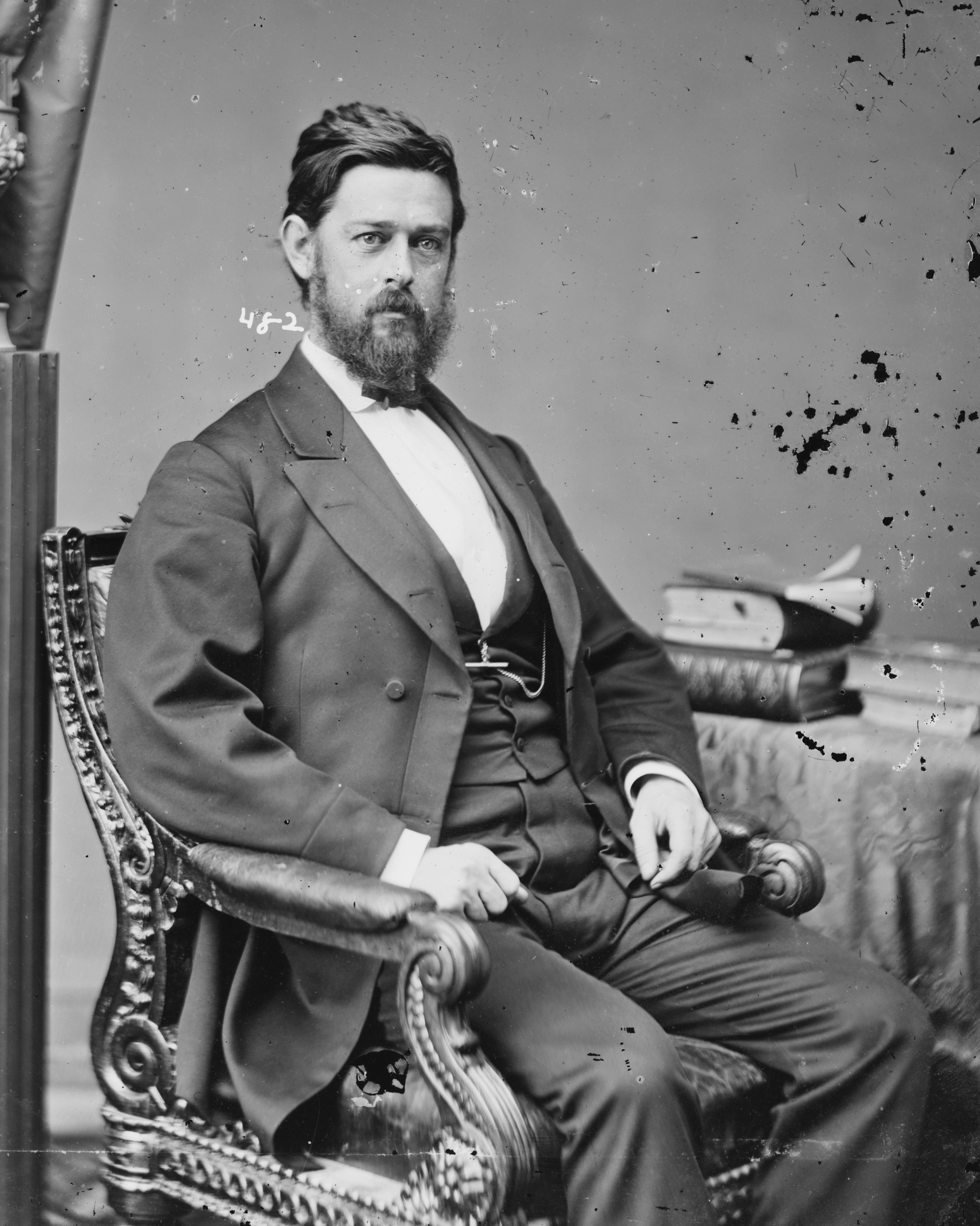
Portrait by Brady, c. 1868–1875

Gorham was born in Greenport, New York on July 5, 1832, the son of George and Martha P. Gorham. He was a descendant of John Gorham, a captain who died in King Philip's War, and three Mayflower passengers. Gorham was educated in New London, Connecticut and moved to California in 1849, one of many "forty-niners" in search of gold. When this didn't pan out, he accepted a position as clerk for Stephen Johnson Field, who became his lifelong mentor and friend. Gorham was elected city clerk of Marysville in 1856 and subsequently pursued a career in journalism. He became assistant editor of the Sacramento Daily Standard in 1859, editor of the San Francisco Daily Nation in 1860, editor of the Marysville Democrat in 1861, and assistant editor of the Sacramento Daily Union from 1861 to 1862. In 1863, Field appointed him clerk of the United States circuit court at San Francisco, where he served for four years. He also served as private secretary to governor Frederick Low from December 1863 to July 1864.

Gorham entered politics as Democrat, but joined the National Union Party after the outbreak of the Civil War and later became a Radical Republican. He ran for Governor of California in 1867 on the National Union ticket, defeating congressman John Bidwell at the party convention by a vote of 167 to 132. However, Gorham lost to Democratic candidate Henry Huntly Haight by a margin of over 10% in a campaign that viciously attacked Gorham's support for the Central Pacific Railroad, Chinese labor and civil rights. The next year, he became one of eight owners of the Southern Pacific Railroad, holding his share of the company until 1870.

Gorham served as secretary of the United States Senate from June 6, 1868 to March 24, 1879, during which he oversaw the creation of the Senate Library and the Congressional Record. He represented California on the Republican National Committee from 1868 to 1880 and was secretary of the Republican Congressional Campaign Committee in 1878. An opponent of president Rutherford B. Hayes and the Compromise of 1877, Gorham served as a delegate to the 1880 Republican National Convention allied with the party's "Stalwart" wing, a decision that cost him reappointment as secretary when Republicans retook the Senate in 1883. From 1880 to 1884, he was editor of the National Republican newspaper.

Gorham later in life

In retirement, Gorham wrote an authoritative two-volume biography of Edwin Stanton, Abraham Lincoln's secretary of war. Gorham "withheld his support" from James G. Blaine in 1884 and broke from the Republican Party in 1896 to support William Jennings Bryan. He became a bimetallist and anti-imperialist, and remained Democrat for the rest of his life. He died of Bright's disease at his home in Washington, D.C. on February 11, 1909. Among the pallbearers at his funeral were Supreme Court justices David J. Brewer and John Marshall Harlan and senators Henry M. Teller and William M. Stewart.

== Caricature gallery ==
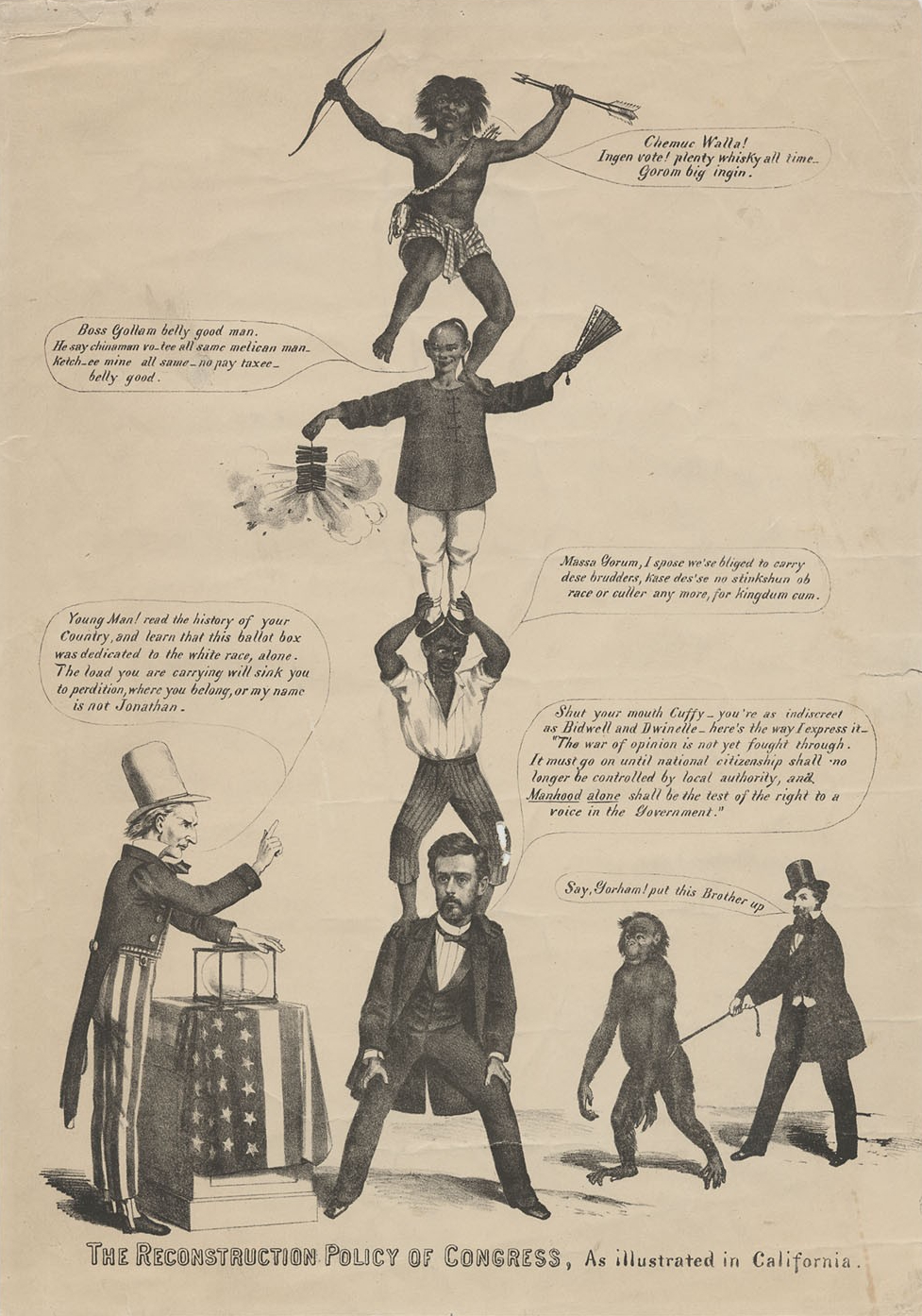
"The Reconstruction Policy of Congress, as Illustrated in California"

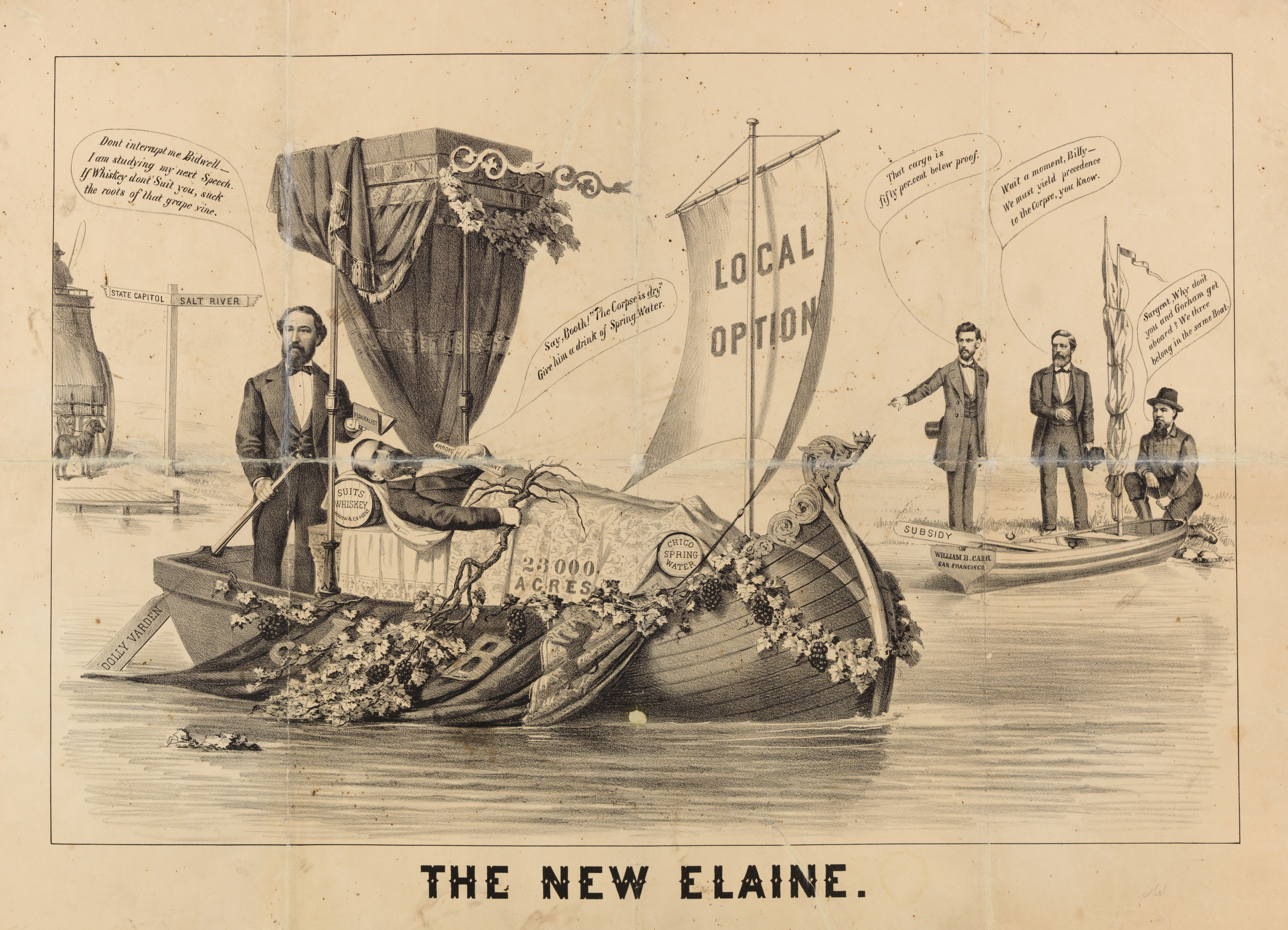
"The New Elaine"

"Hayes Providing Gorham and Sargent With the Sinews of the Campaign for California"

"Look Upon This Picture and on This"

"Supervisor Nathl. Holland Carrying out the madates of the Republican party in the interest of Governor Hayes"

"The Nail Eh? Sensation!"

"'They Stand Like Dumb Statues, Amid the Ruins of the Republican Party in California if They Do Not Speak.' —Ex."

"A Russia-Turco War in California"

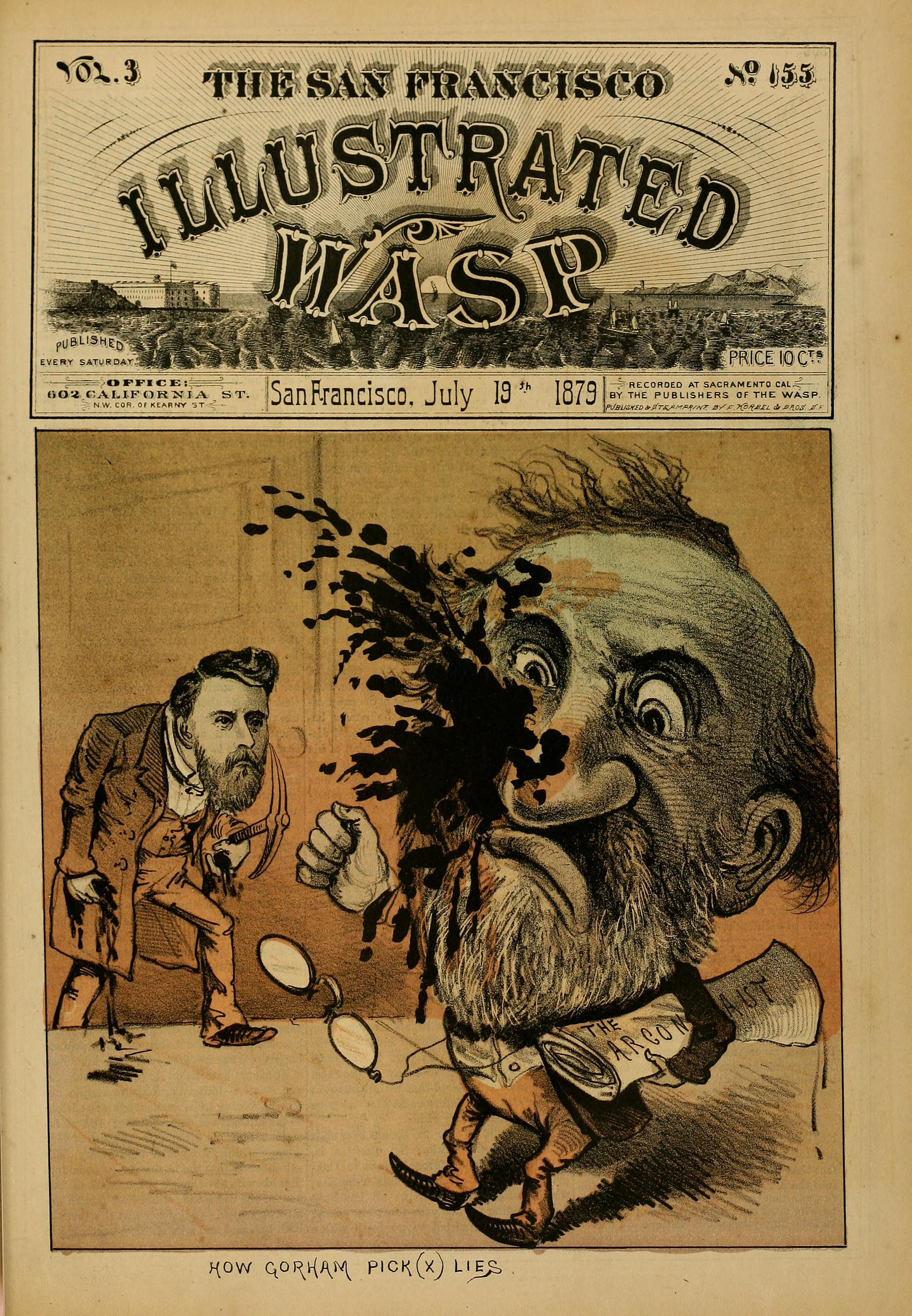
"How Gorham Pick(x) Lies"

"Gorham's Political Marionettes"

"Celebrating the Glorious Fourth, The Patriots in Procession"

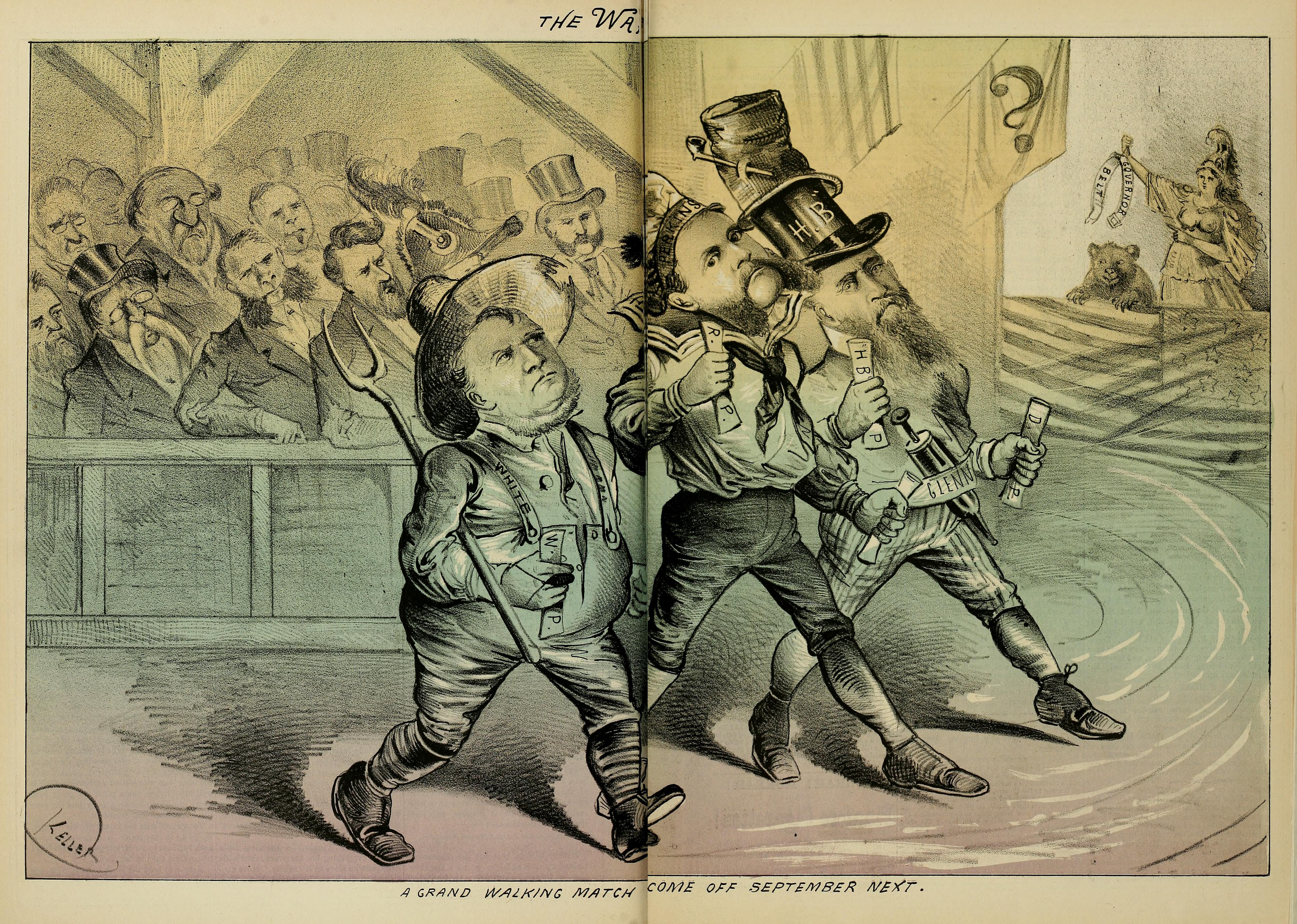
"A Grand Walking Match Come Off September Next"

"Night Made Hideous by Political Croakes Telling Truth... by Calling Each Other Liars and Thieves"

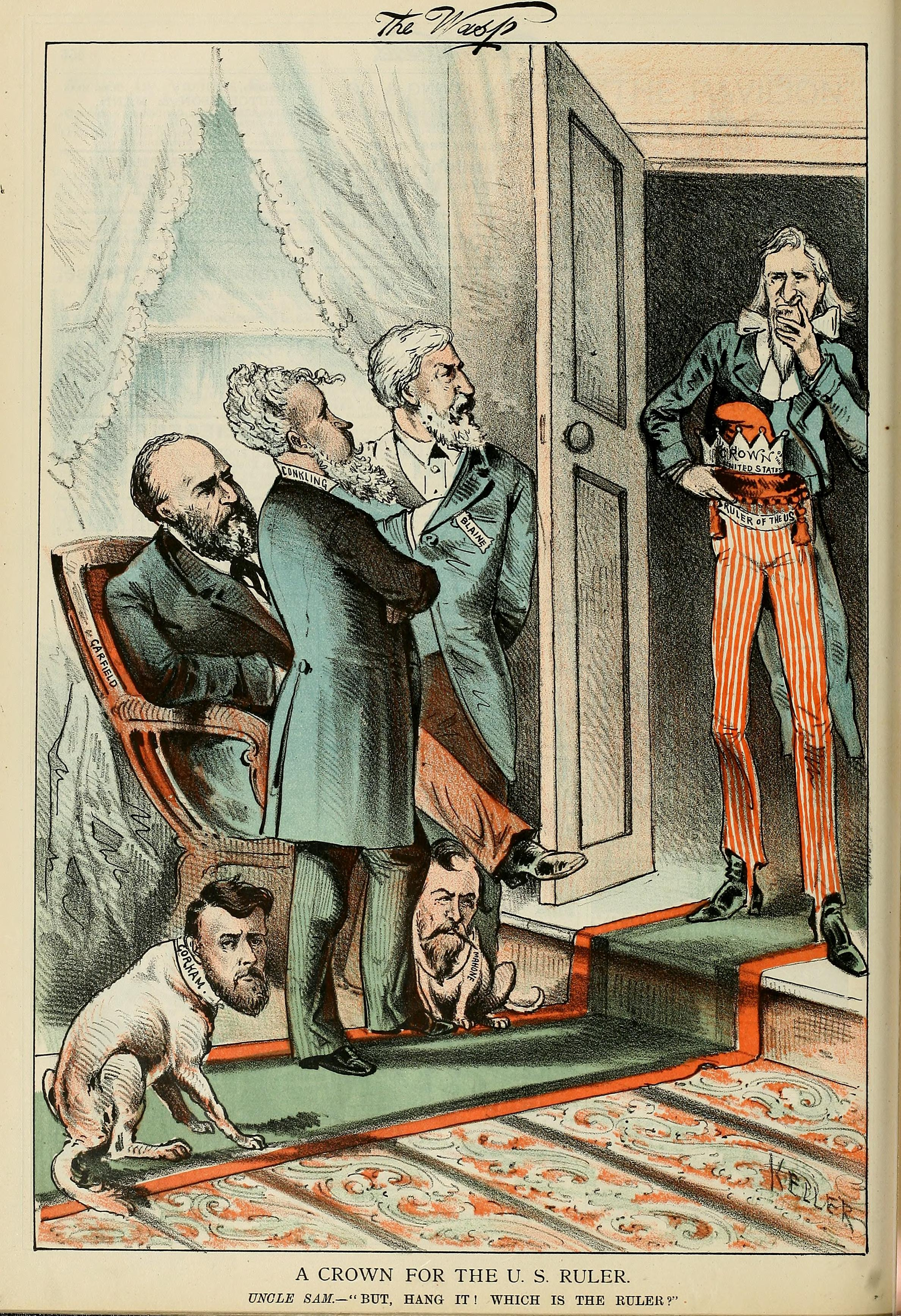
"A Crown for the U. S. Ruler"

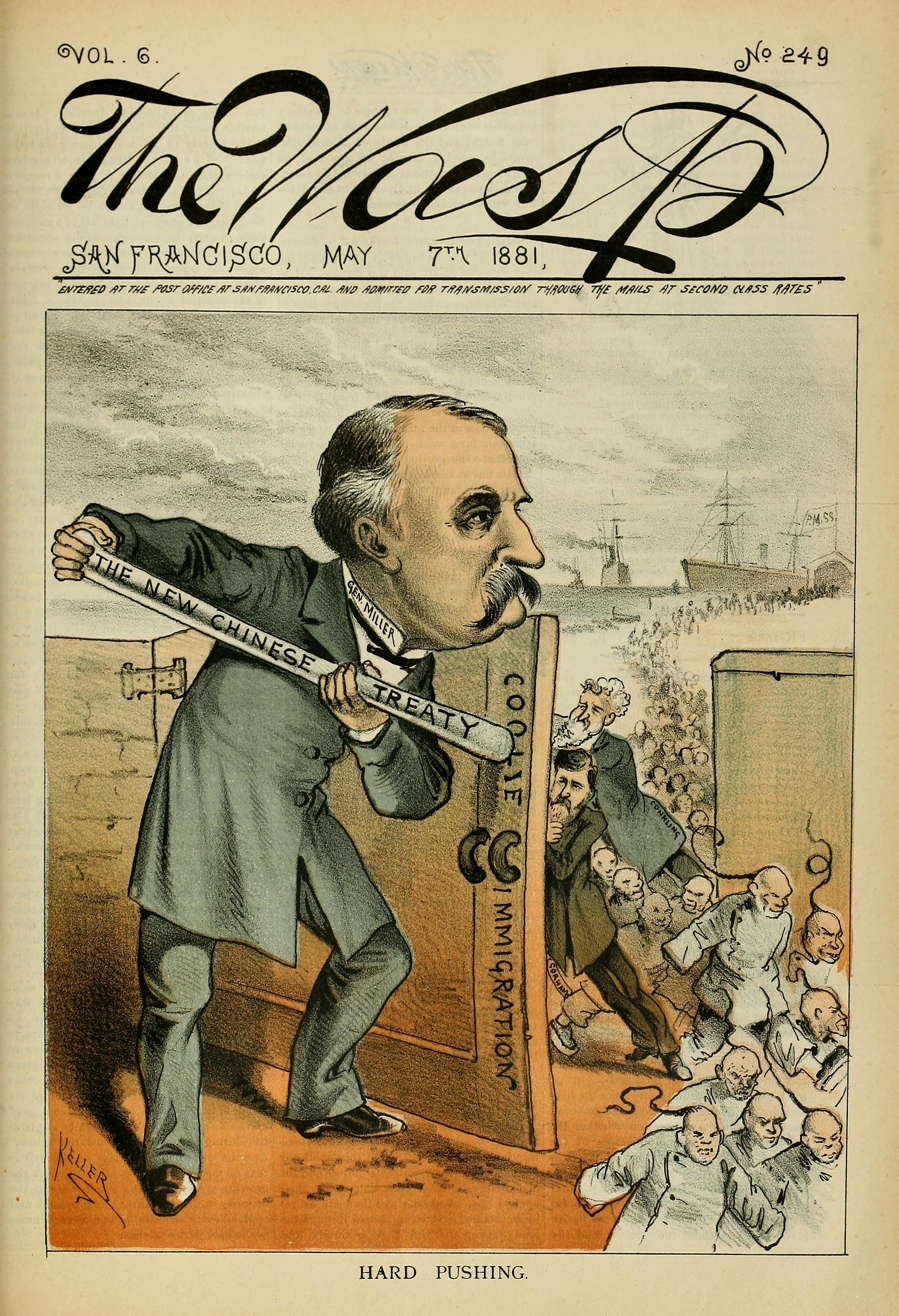
"Hard Pushing"

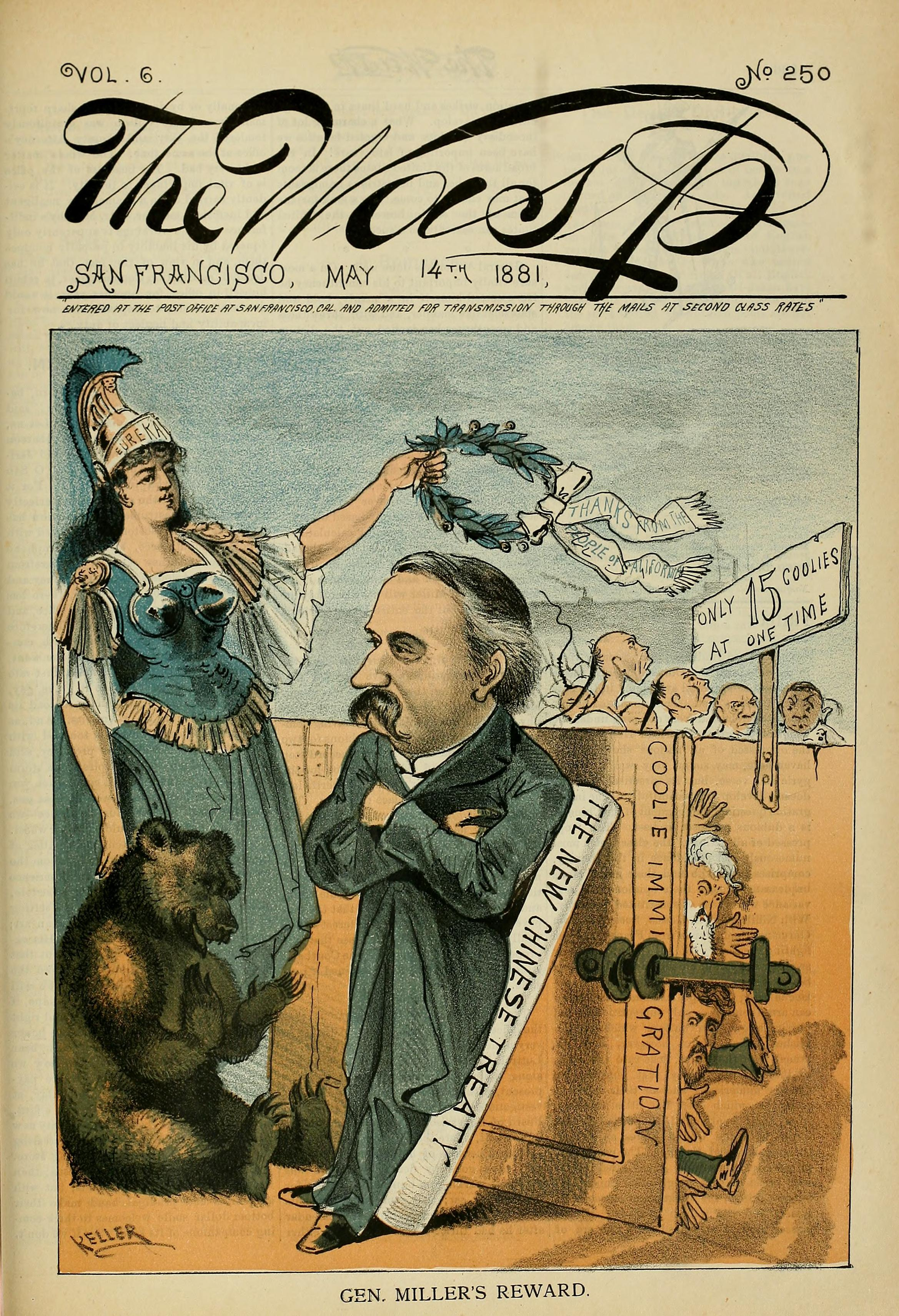
"Gen. Miller's Reward"

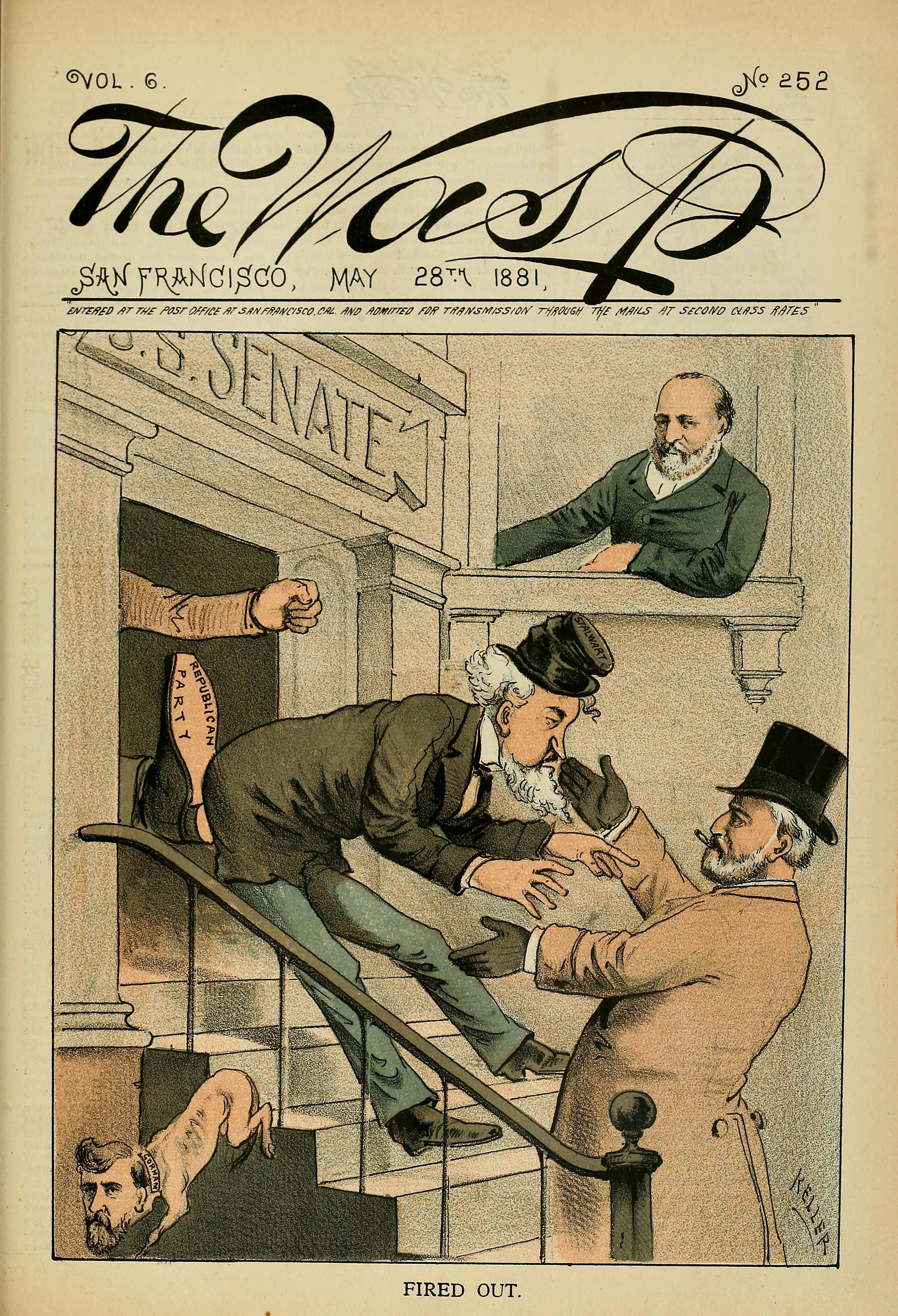
"Fired Out"

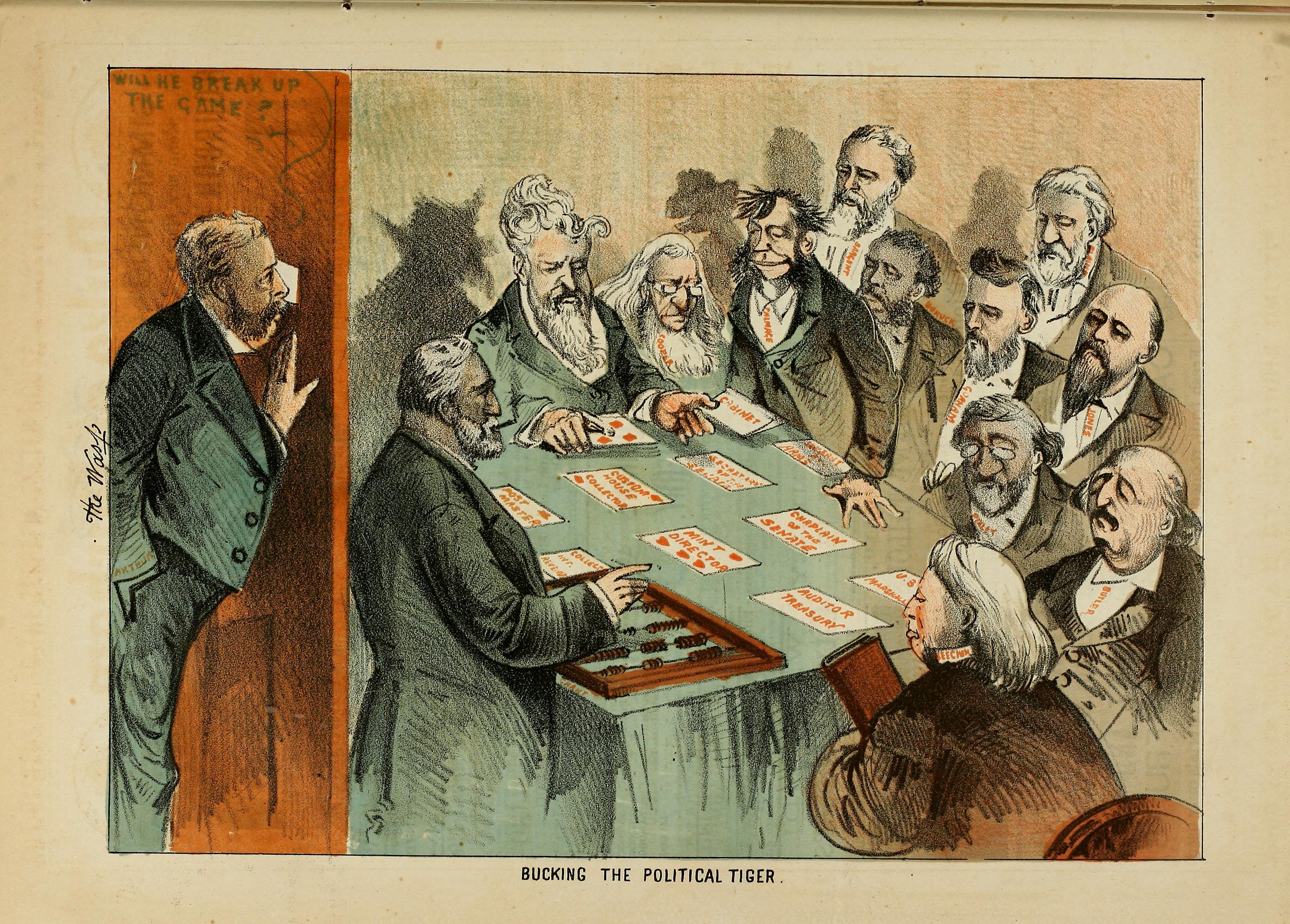
"Bucking the Political Tiger"

"Gulliver and the Liliputians"

== Works ==
=== Books ===
- Mighels, Henry R. (1879). "Sketch of the Life and Character of the Author". Sage Brush Leaves. San Francisco: Edward Bosqui & Co. pp. 1–7.
- Roscoe Conkling Vindicated: His Controversy With Mr. Blaine—1866; His Resignation From the Senate and the Causes That Led to It—1881. New York. 1888.
- Biographical Notice of Stephen J. Field. 1892.
- Field, Stephen J. (1893). "The Story of the Attempted Assassination of Justice Field by a Former Associate on the Supreme Bench of California". Personal Reminiscences of Early Days in California. pp. 241–406.
- Life and Public Services of Edwin M. Stanton. Vol. I. Boston: Houghton, Mifflin and Company. 1899.
- Life and Public Services of Edwin M. Stanton. Vol. II. Boston: Houghton, Mifflin and Company. 1899.

=== Speeches ===
- Speech Delivered by George C. Gorham of San Francisco, Union Nominee for Governor, at Platt’s Hall, San Francisco, Wednesday Evening, July 10th, 1867.
- The Grant & Wilson Campaign; Speech of Hon. Geo. C. Gorham, Secretary of the United States Senate, Delivered at Platt’s Hall, San Francisco, Wednesday, Oct. 2d, under the auspices of the Republican State Central Committee.

== Sources ==
- "DEATH OF MRS. GORHAM". Carson Daily Appeal. Carson City. December 17, 1875.
- "A CAPITAL AFFAIR". Washington Chronicle. Washington, D.C. December 26, 1876.
- Hills, William Sanford; Hills, Thomas (1906). The Hills Family in America. New York: The Grafton Press. p. 378.

Party political offices
Preceded by Frederick Low	Republican nominee for Governor of California; 1867	Succeeded by Newton Booth
