= Foreign Broadcast Information Service =

CIA foreign news monitoring service (1941–2005)

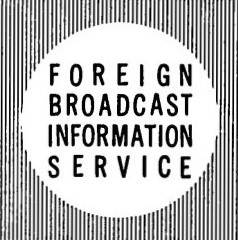
- FBIS logo circa 1970

Service overview
- Formed: February 26, 1941
- Dissolved: November 2005
- Superseding service: Central Intelligence Agency Open Source Center
- Jurisdiction: United States government
- Status: Defunct
- Headquarters: Reston, Virginia, US
- Parent service: Federal Communications Commission (until 1945); Central Intelligence Agency (from 1946)
- Key document: National Security Act of 1947
- Website: https://web.archive.org/web/20041210234009/http://www.fbis.gov/

The Foreign Broadcast Information Service (FBIS) was an open source intelligence component of the Central Intelligence Agency's Directorate of Science and Technology. It monitored, translated, and disseminated within the U.S. government openly available news and information from media sources outside the United States. Its headquarters was in Rosslyn, later Reston, Virginia, and it maintained approximately 20 monitoring stations worldwide. In November 2005, it was announced that FBIS would become the newly formed Open Source Center, tasked with the collection and analysis of publicly available intelligence.

== History ==
On 26 February 1941, President Roosevelt directed that $150,000 be allocated for creation of the Foreign Broadcast Monitoring Service (FBMS) under the authority of the Federal Communications Commission. The mandate of the FBMS was to record, translate, transcribe and analyze shortwave propaganda radio programs that were being beamed at the United States by the Axis powers. Its first monitoring station was established in October 1941 in Portland, Oregon.

=== Foreign Broadcast Intelligence Service ===
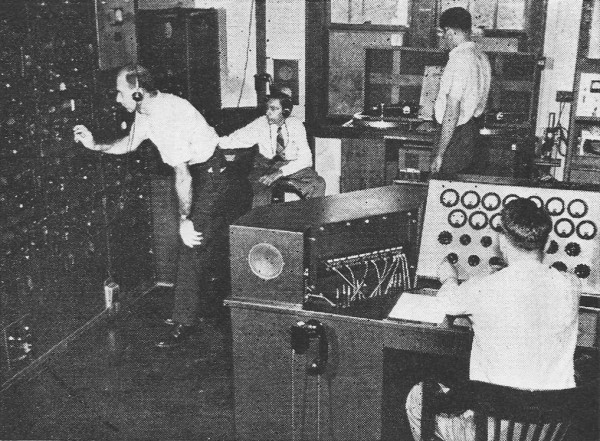
FBIS staff listening to foreign broadcasts in January 1945

The year following the attack on Pearl Harbor in December 1941, the system gained importance and changed its name to the Foreign Broadcast Intelligence Service partly to make it sound more like a war agency.

At four different listening centers it recorded shortwave broadcasts on plastic disks. Selected material was transcribed and translated and then sent to War agencies with weekly reports. These special reports included special titles such as Radio Tokyo's Racial Propaganda to the United States, Underground Movements and Morale in Japan, and New Nazi Portrait of the American Soldier. Monitored stations included official stations in many countries, and "black" stations that were not what they pretended to be. These black stations broadcast attacks on President Franklin D. Roosevelt while pretending to be stations in the American Midwest. This tactic was used to stir up racial tensions and other issues.

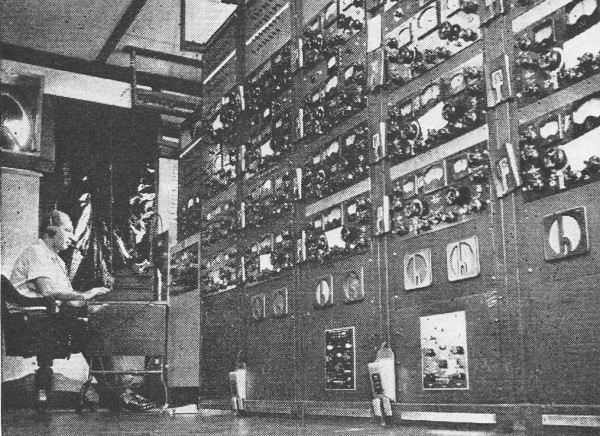
FBIS radio recording equipment in 1945

Multiple speeches and recording were monitored including speeches by Adolf Hitler, Joseph Goebbels, Joachim von Ribbentrop, Benito Mussolini, Philippe Pétain, Pierre Laval, and others; broadcasts over German radio by American citizens, including Fred W. Kaltenbach, Douglas Chandler, and Edward Leo Delaney; and broadcasts from Japan or Japanese-held territory, including news reports and commentary by "Tokyo Rose." The FBIS kept track of a total of sixty black stations, which included a German-language station that pretended to represent an anti-Nazi army group, an anti-Nazi "Catholic" station, and an English-language station that attacked Winston Churchill.

=== Foreign Broadcast Information Service ===
With the termination of the OSS following the end of World War II, the service was transferred to the Department of the Army. Like many other wartime organizations, the service was threatened with disbandment. The possibility of its disbandment was roundly criticized in many different quarters, which helped ensure its survival. When President Harry S. Truman created the Central Intelligence Group under the direction of a Director of Central Intelligence by presidential directive on January 22, 1946, the FBIS became part of that group.

In 1946, the service was renamed the Foreign Broadcast Information Service (FBIS), and became a part of the Central Intelligence Agency (CIA) as that organization was formed following the National Security Act of 1947. Its original mission revolved around radio and press agency monitoring, built on what was already becoming an “almost mature, trained and disciplined” organization from the war experience.

In response to the Cuban Missile Crisis and START Treaty, FBIS was tasked with monitoring for clandestine and encoded messages from all nations and coordinating broadcast media contact points who could instantly broadcast urgent messages on "All Channels" and "All Calls".

In 1967, the Service's mission was expanded to cover foreign mass media transmitted by radio, television, and print.

Logo of FBIS in the 2000s.

In 2007, Readex announced its plans to create a digital edition entitled Foreign Broadcast Information Service (FBIS) Daily Reports, 1941–1996. As of March 2017, this collection is available online via a paid subscription to Readex, as are Daily Report Annexes for 1974–1996.

The FBIS became the Open Source Center (OSC) within the CIA in 2005; the CIA discontinued public access to OSC in 2013.

== Services ==
FBIS had approximately 20 stations, commonly called bureaus, that were located around the world. These stations operated as an adjunct of a U.S. embassy/consulate or military command. Bureaus opened and closed at various times depending on the world situation and local circumstances. These stations were not covert and operated with the consent of the host government. In addition, a few of the bureaus were located on territory belonging to or administered by the U.S. such as Key West, Florida, Bahia Sucia, Puerto Rico, the Panama Canal Zone, etc. The personnel in the stations were both U.S. citizens and foreign nationals who were responsible for the collection, translation, and dissemination of foreign open source material. Depending on location, and the availability of print media, these personnel may have been responsible for translation of more than one language. Because of the large number print/radio/TV/satellite sources worldwide FBIS did not collect all open source material, but only those sources that met the requirements of the Intelligence Community.

Besides the translations done overseas a large volume of less-time sensitive material was sent to FBIS headquarters in Rosslyn and Reston where a more detailed translation could take place.

Not only were translations provided by in-house FBIS personnel, but approximately 700 independent contractors were also employed.

=== Joint Publications Research Service ===
The Joint Publications Research Service (JPRS) was a United States government defense-funded organization that was absorbed into FBIS but its funding and personnel did not transfer. For all practical purposes it ceased its massive operations (80,000 reports since 1957) in 1970. JPRS translations were merged with daily reports of the FBIS in 1995, then wound down to virtually nothing under FBIS by 1997.

According to FBIS, access to current and past JPRS reports is possible via World News Connection. In 2012, Readex, a division of NewsBank, began releasing its digital edition entitled Joint Publications Research Service (JPRS) Reports, 1957–1994. As of 2022, access to this material is available through some university libraries.

According to the Imperial War Museum, JPRS was a CIA operation operating out of the Department of Commerce.

== Customers ==
Material provided by FBIS was disseminated to over 700 recipients in not only the U.S. Intelligence Community, but also a large number of government, diplomatic and military organizations.

The material provided by FBIS, although it came from openly available, public radio and TV broadcasts, was not made freely available to the American people, frequently due to copyright laws.

== In the news ==
=== Saving FBIS from budget cuts ===
The Federation of American Scientists launched a successful campaign in 1997 to save FBIS from planned budget cuts. During its campaign, FBIS was described by academicians at the time as the "biggest bang for the buck in the American intelligence community."

=== The Larry Chin spy incident ===
Larry Wu-tai Chin worked for FBIS from 1952 to 1981 and sold classified documents to China.

== Similar organizations ==
=== Australia ===
- Office of National Intelligence Open Source Centre

=== Great Britain ===
- BBC Monitoring
