= Charles Evans (librarian) =

American librarian and bibliographer

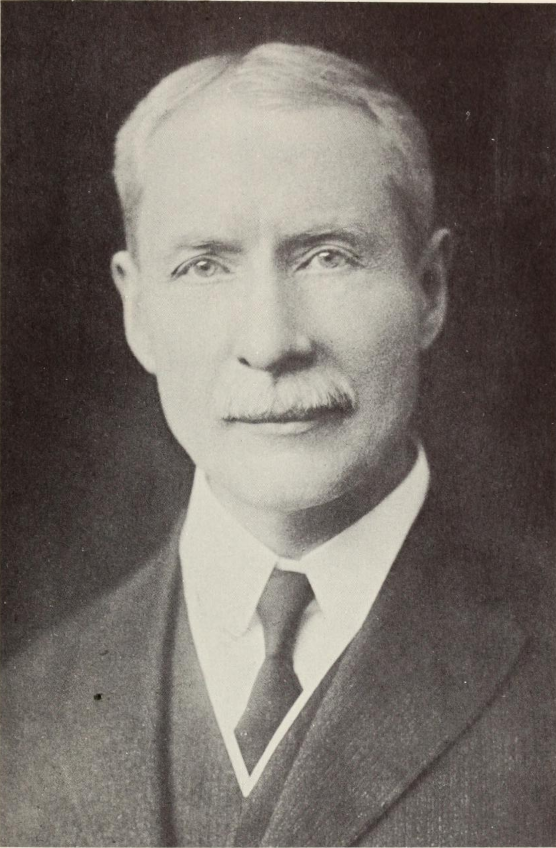
- Born: November 13, 1850; Boston, Massachusetts, US
- Died: February 8, 1935 (aged 84)
- Burial place: Memorial Park Cemetery, Skokie, Illinois
- Occupation: Librarian
- Known for: Wrote American Bibliography

Charles Evans (November 13, 1850 – February 8, 1935) was an American librarian and bibliographer.

Evans was named one of American Libraries's 100 most important library and information science leaders of the 20th century. Evans is most well known as the bibliographer and compiler of the first 12 volumes of his book, American Bibliography: A Chronological Dictionary of All Books, Pamphlets, and Periodical Publications Printed in the United States of America from the Genesis of Printing in 1639 Down to and Including the Year 1830, with Bibliographical and Biographical Notes. He was also a founder of the American Library Association along with Melvil Dewey.

== Biography ==
=== Early life ===
The son of Irish immigrants Charles Peter and Mary Ewing Evans, Evans was born in Boston, Massachusetts, on November 13, 1850. Evans' parents both died before he was ten years old, at which point Evans and eventually his older brother, Thomas John, were sent to live and study at the Boston Asylum and Farm School for Indigent Boys on Thompson Island. Evans was so grateful for the education he received here, that decades later he donated a copy of each volume of his American Bibliography to the school, with an inscription from "an old Farm School boy." In this donation, he is quoted as saying that because of the Boston Asylum and Farm School, he came to value and live by "obedience, fidelity, individual character and industry. Possessed of these, there is nothing which may not be obtained in life". In 1914, Evans was invited back to address students and guests at the school's 100th anniversary celebration.

=== Early stages of Evans' career ===
Evans studied under Samuel Eliot—a trustee of the Boston Athenaeum—at the Boston Asylum and Farm School, and made such an impression on him that by the time Evans turned 16, on June 12, 1866, Eliot had hired him as assistant librarian at the Boston Athenaeum. Evans did not have formal training of the scholars, bibliographers, and librarians who surrounded him. Because of this, library scholars were reluctant to aid him in his bibliography project. It was here that Evans met William Frederick Poole, the librarian who would make the biggest impact on Evans' life when it came to his knowledge and appreciation for the organization and classification in libraries. Years later into his career, Evans would recommend Poole join the American Library Association.

=== Career timeline ===
- 1872-1878 Organizer and Librarian at the Indianapolis Public Library
- 1884-1887 Organizer and Assistant Librarian at the Enoch Pratt Free Library in Baltimore, MD
- 1887-1889 Organizer at the Omaha Public Library
- 1889-1892 Librarian at the Indianapolis Public Library
- 1892-1895 Classifier of the collections at the Newberry Library in Chicago
- 1895-1896 Organizer at the Virginia Library of the McCormick Theological Seminary of Chicago
- 1896-1901 Librarian at the Chicago Historical Society

=== Controversy surrounding Evans ===
Evans was known to oppose the relocation of libraries and was more than once consequently asked to submit his resignation due to the fuss he caused. In 1892, he was fired from the Indianapolis Public Library for publicly disagreeing with the board's plans to open a new building, which Evans believed would too-soon be congested with an influx of books. In 1901, Evans was dismissed from his post as librarian at the McCormick Theological Seminary in Chicago due to his quarreling over which classification to use – the committee wished to use Charles Cutter's system (which organized books by subject), while Evans demanded that they use the classification system he was both used to and fond of. Around the same time, Evans compiled his Charter, Constitution, By-laws, Roll of Membership, MDCCCLVI-MDCCCCI: List of Officers and Members, MDCCCCI (Chicago, 1901, printed for the Society) with several glaring factual errors, but when he refused to republish it correctly, they fired him.

=== American Library Association ===
In 1876, Evans, along with Melvil Dewey of the Dewey Decimal Classification system, co-founded the American Library Association. Evans recommended other integral members - renowned librarians he'd met along the way - to become a part of the association. These members then came together at a conference held in Philadelphia, where Evans would give a speech on his "The Sizes of Printed Books" paper, which was published in ALA's first volume of the Library Journal,published by Frederick Leypoldt.

In 1877, Evans became the American Library Association's first treasurer. Evans continued to contribute to the Library Journal.

=== American Bibliography ===
Evans officially began working on American Bibliography - his lifelong goal - in 1901 and compiled it over a course of years through 1934. Originally, Evans stored his notecards in corset boxes with the dates contained within written on the illustration's waistline. Publication took a few hiatuses during World War II in between volumes, but eventually, all desired volumes were published, including some that were published posthumously by outsiders eager to continue Evans' work, particularly Roger Bristol. The first volume was published by Evans himself and covered the span of 1639-1740. All succeeding volumes were published on borrowed money for both publication purposes and travel purposes, as Evans preferred to travel around the United States in order to actually see the books he was including in his work, though when he was not able to travel, he was known to include "ghost" titles, as well as skip publications altogether due to the amount of space, and therefore money, they would take up in his printed book. It is said that American Bibliography lacks a proper representation of Harvard dissertations and broadsides. The first 12 volumes of Evans' American Bibliography are dedicated to individuals of influence in his life and work.

Charles Evans (1903–59). American Bibliography. Chicago: Blakely Press.
Volume	From	To	Year	Dedicatee(s)	Fulltext
1	1639 (1)	1729 (3244)	1903	Addison C. Harris, John Hampden Holliday, George Tousey Porter, et al.	Internet Archive; HathiTrust
2	1730 (3245)	1750 (6623)	1904	The President, Trustees, Proprietors, and Library officials of the Boston Athenæum	Internet Archive
3	1751 (6624)	1764 (9890)	1905	William Frederick Poole	Internet Archive
4	1765 (9891)	1773 (13091)	1907	Samuel Eliot	Internet Archive
5	1774 (13092)	1778 (16176)	1909	Thomas Prince, Isaiah Thomas, Benjamin Franklin, John Carter Brown, George Brinley, James Lenox	Internet Archive
6	1779 (16177)	1785 (19448)	1910	Samuel Foster Haven, James Hammond Trumbull, John Russell Bartlett, Henry Stevens, Joseph Sabin, Oswald Seidensticker, Charles Hammett, Charles Swift Riche Hildeburn	Internet Archive
7	1786 (19449)	1789 (22297)	1912	President, Vice Presidents, Councillors, Officers, and Members of the American Antiquarian Society	Internet Archive
8	1790 (22298)	1792 (25074)	1914	Committee of the Management of John Carter Brown Library at Brown University	Internet Archive
9				Charles Saunders Brigham	HathiTrust
10				Lena Young (Evans' wife)	HathiTrust
11	1796	1797		John Quincey	HathiTrust
12				Calvin Coolidge	HathiTrust
13	1799	1800			HathiTrust
14	Index				HathiTrust

The entire Evans Collection was eventually photographed and put onto microfilm, and is available at many research libraries. A paywalled fully searchable digital edition titled Early American Imprints, Series I: Evans, 1639-1980 is for sale from Readex, as part of its Archive of Americana.

=== Other writings ===
Evans was also actively involved in both Library Journal and Proceedings of the American Antiquarian Society, and he was known to write for them from time to time, as well.

=== Marriage and children ===
Evans married Lena Young, who supported and encouraged his work efforts, on April 8, 1883.

- Gertrude, born 1884
- Eliot Howland, born 1886
- Charles Sumner, born 1888, who became a well-known golfer later in life. Chick Evans
- Constance Evans, born 1889

=== Death ===
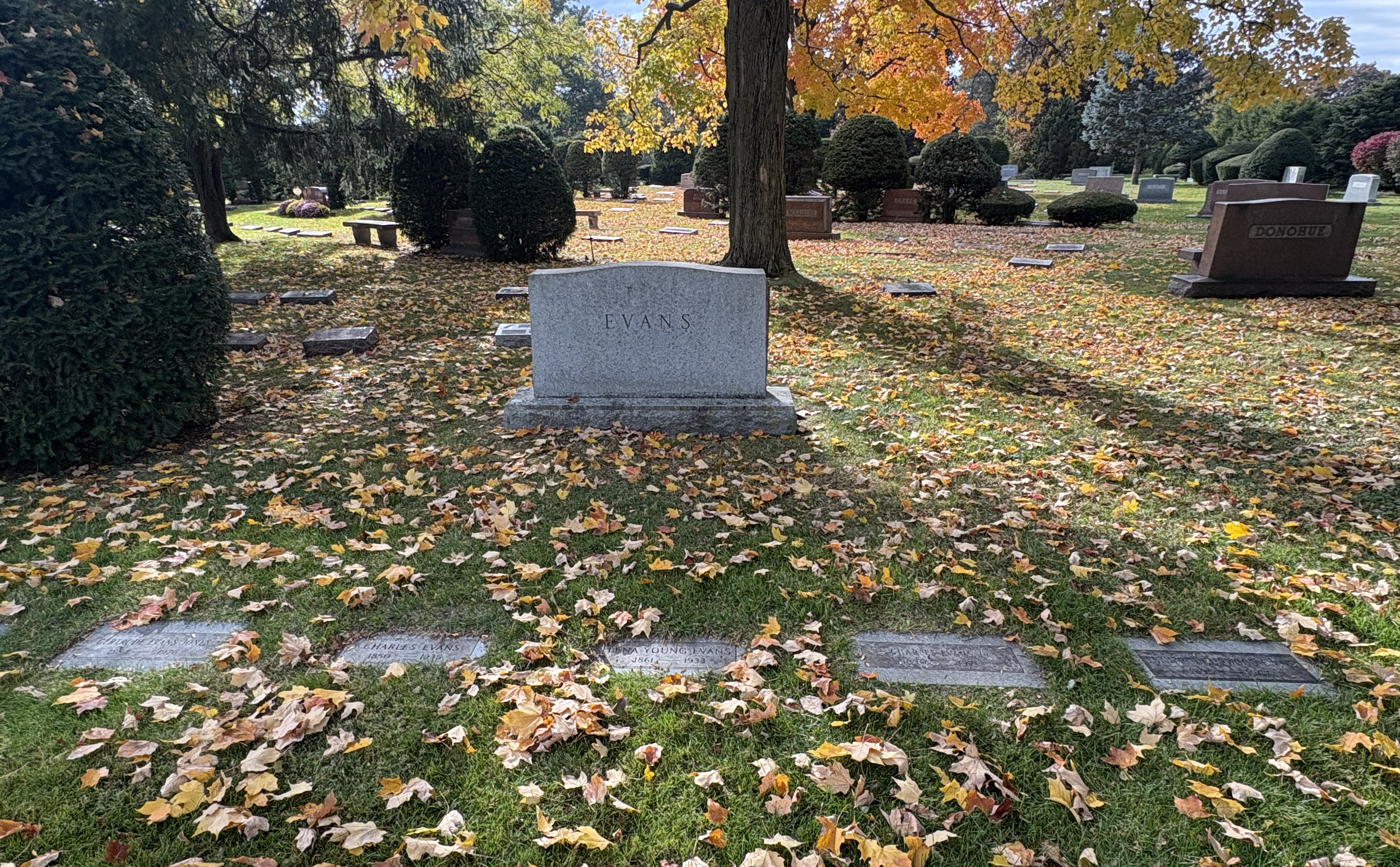
Evans's grave (second from left) at Memorial Park Cemetery

Charles and Lena remained married until her death on October 5, 1933. Charles Evans died of a stroke on February 8, 1935, and was buried at Memorial Park Cemetery in Skokie, Illinois.

== Honors, awards and memberships ==
- 1910 Elected to American Antiquarian Society
- 1926 Elected to Colonial Society of Massachusetts
- 1933 American Library Association Honorary Membership.
- 1934 Brown University awarded him an honorary Doctor of Letters
