= United States Senate Library =

Official library of the U.S. Senate

Coordinates: 38.8928°N 77.0069°W

The United States Senate Library is the official library of the United States Senate. While the Library informally began in 1792, it was officially established in 1871, and today holds an estimated 220,000 volumes.

The United States Senate Librarian manages the Senate Library, which is under the supervision of the Office of the Secretary of the United States Senate. Meghan Dunn has been the Senate Librarian since 2022. The Library is located in the Russell Senate Office Building in SR-B15, and its website and catalog are restricted to Senate staff.

== History ==
The Senate Library was founded during the 2nd Congress (1791–1792) after a resolution directing the Secretary to "procure and deposit in his office, the laws of several states" for use by senators. In the early years leading to the library officially becoming established, the library suffered two fires. The first fire occurred during the burning of Washington in 1814 when the British attacked Washington during the War of 1812 and sacked Capitol Hill.

To replace the collection, Thomas Jefferson offered his private library at whatever price they were able to pay, installments welcome. Jefferson's 6,487 volumes formed the heart of the new Library of Congress collection. The second fire occurred in 1851 and destroyed all but 20,000 volumes in the Library of Congress collection. The damage to the Library of Congress collections prompted the Senate to preserve its records by designating space in the Capitol for the Senate Library. The Senate decided to procure and install steel shelving to replace wooden shelving to fireproof their collection from future damage.

Secretaries oversaw the early collection of the library which included printed bills and resolutions, committee reports and other Senate documents. William Hickey, Chief Clerk of the Senate (1855–1866), had been collecting 10 copies of every Senate document since 1824. Starting to accumulate a vast collection, Hickey lobbied for a library to manage and preserve all of these documents for use by the Senate. Despite various attempts to establish a library, it was not until February 11, 1870, that the Senate designated three rooms (S-331, S-332, and S-333) in the Library of Congress for the Senate Library.

In 1871, Senate Secretary George Congdon Gorham appointed George S. Wagner the first Senate Librarian. Wagner had the task of organizing Hickey's collection for better access and for preservation purposes (many of the materials were in fragile condition). By 1890, the collection was exceeding 98,000 volumes and was outgrowing the space in the library. Many rare documents and manuscripts were in a basement storage under poor conditions. Some of the materials in this suffering storage place were signed by George Washington. In 1902, the library was appropriated funds to build steel storage shelves. The new storage space was housed in the Senate attic (S-410 and S-419).

In 1999, the Senate Library moved from the Capitol to the Russell Senate Office Building. The library now resides in SR-B15.

== Mission, materials, and services ==
The Library serves present and former senators, member and committee staff, Senate leadership, and Senate officers. The mission of the Senate Library has changed over time, as a focus has changed from the collection and storage of Senate documents to providing legislative, historic, legal, business and general reference materials. The Senate Library aims to carry out its mission in an accurate, prompt, and nonpartisan manner.

The Library's book collection comprises hundreds of thousands of volumes on history, geography, biography, politics and law and has material dating back to the early 19th century. Many were signed by the author or previous owner. The Senate Library receives the United States Congressional Serial Set, which contains over 15,000 congressional reports and documents since 1817. The Library added a legislative status database in 1975. Calls for this service have peaked at 80,000 per year. Today, the library serves as many people in one day as it did in one month in 1964, nearly 60,000 inquiries per year, based primarily on the growth in Senate staff from 2,000 in 1964 to more than 7,000 today.

The Senate Library has a reading room, study carrels, computers, and a scanning and microform center. The Library's microfilm collection includes over one million microform and over 6,000 microfilm reels. Library tours and scheduled throughout the year and personalized tours can be made by request. The Library makes deliveries twice daily to offices with requested information.

The authorized library staff is 22 people, including the Librarian and 13 other professionals.

== See also ==
- National Technical Reports Library

== Notes ==
- Faust, L. UNUM: Newsletter of the Office of the Secretary of the Senate, January/February 1999, Vol 3, Issue 1.
- United States Senate Library, S. Pub. 109-21.
