= Oechalia (Aetolia) =

Coordinates: 38°54′11″N 21°45′31″E

Oechalia or Oichalia (Ancient Greek: Οἰχαλία) was a town in ancient Aetolia

According to Greek mythology, King Eurytus of Oechalia had promised the hand of his beautiful daughter Iole to whoever defeated him in an archery competition. Heracles beat him but Eurytus refused to keep his promise, so Heracles sacked the city, killed Eurytus and kidnapped Iole. However, there was great discussion in antiquity about whether this Oechalia referred to this city, or that of Euboea, of Thessaly, or another located in Trachis, also in Thessaly, or even to others that were located in Arcadia or Messenia. The author of the epic poem Capture of Oechalia (usually attributed to Creophylus of Samos), Sophocles (in The Trachiniae) and Hecataeus of Miletus (who locates Oechalia near Eretria) were aligned among with those who identified this Oechalia with the Euboean location. Homer, equivocally, and Apollodorus of Athens and Aristarchus of Samothrace placed it in Thessaly. Also, Demetrius of Scepsis placed it in Arcadia, and Homer also calls the Oechalia in Messenia the city of Eurytus in both the Iliad and the Odyssey, and this identification was followed by Pherecydes of Athens and Pausanias. Strabo makes mention of all these possibilities but does not offer any additional data on the concrete location of the Oechalia of Thessaly.

The site of Oechalia is placed at the palaiokastro ("old fort") of Koryskhades or Koryschades (Κορυσχάδες) in the municipal unit of Karpenisi.
