= Oechalia =

Oechalia (ancient Greek: Οἰχαλία) may refer to:

places

- Oechalia (Aetolia), a town of ancient Aetolia, Greece
- Oechalia (Arcadia), a town of ancient Arcadia, Greece
- Oechalia (Euboea), a town of ancient Euboea, Greece
- Oechalia (Messenia), a town of ancient Messenia, Greece
- Oechalia (Thessaly), a town of ancient Thessaly, Greece
- Oechalia (Trachis), a town of Trachis, ancient Thessaly, Greece
- Oichalia (disambiguation), one of several modern places in Greece

other

- Capture of Oechalia, an epic poem relating to an unknown Oechalia among the ancient towns above
- Oechalia (insect), a genus of stink bugs in the subfamily Asopinae.
