= Oechalia (Thessaly) =

Town in ancient Thessaly

Oechalia or Oichalia (Ancient Greek: Οἰχαλία, romanized: Oikhalía) was a town in ancient Thessaly, on the Peneius, between Pelinna to the east and Tricca to the west, not far from Ithome.

Oechalia is mentioned by Homer in the Catalogue of Ships of the Iliad, where it was part of the territories ruled by Podalirius and Machaon.

According to Greek mythology, King Eurytus of Oechalia had promised the hand of his beautiful daughter Iole to whoever defeated him in an archery competition. Heracles beat him but Eurytus refused to keep his promise, so Heracles sacked the city, killed Eurytus and kidnapped Iole. However, there was great discussion in antiquity about whether this Oechalia referred to this city, or that of Euboea, or another also located in Thessaly or even to others that were located in Arcadia or Messenia. Homer, equivocally, and Apollodorus of Athens and Aristarchus of Samothrace placed it in Thessaly. Instead, the author of the epic poem Capture of Oechalia (usually attributed to Creophylus of Samos), Sophocles (in The Trachiniae) and Hecataeus of Miletus (who locates Oechalia near Eretria) were aligned among with those who identified this Oechalia with the Euboean location. Also, Demetrius of Scepsis placed it in Arcadia., and Homer also calls the Oechalia in Messenia the city of Eurytus in both the Iliad and the Odyssey, and this identification was followed by Pherecydes of Athens and Pausanias. Strabo makes mention of all these possibilities but does not offer any additional data on the concrete location of the Oechalia of Thessaly.

The site's location is unknown. The modern town of Oichalia, also close to Pelinna and Tricca, echoes the ancient name, but is east of the former contrary to the location's description in ancient sources.
