= Oechalia (Messenia) =

Town in ancient Messenia

Coordinates: 37°16′N 21°56′E

Oechalia or Oichalia (Ancient Greek: Οἰχαλία) was a town in ancient Messenia, in the plain of Stenyclerus. It was in ruins in the time of Epaminondas, and its position was a matter of dispute in later times. Strabo identified it with Andania, the ancient residence of the Messenian kings, and Pausanias with Carnasium, which was only 8 stadia distant from Andania, and upon the river Charadrus. Carnasium, in the time of Pausanias, was the name given to a grove of cypresses, in which were statues of Apollo Carneius, of Hermes Criophorus, and of Persephone. It was here that the mystic rites of the great goddesses were celebrated, and that the urn was preserved containing the bones of Eurytus, the son of Melaneus.

According to Greek mythology, King Eurytus of Oechalia had promised the hand of his beautiful daughter Iole to whoever defeated him in an archery competition. Heracles beat him but Eurytus refused to keep his promise, so Heracles sacked the city, killed Eurytus and kidnapped Iole. However, there was great discussion in antiquity about whether this Oechalia referred to this city, or that of Euboea, or one of two located in Thessaly or even to another that was located in Arcadia. Homer calls the Oechalia in Messenia the city of Eurytus in both the Iliad and the Odyssey, and this identification was followed by Pherecydes of Athens and Pausanias. However, Homer also, followed Apollodorus of Athens and Aristarchus of Samothrace, placed it in Thessaly. The author of the epic poem Capture of Oechalia (usually attributed to Creophylus of Samos), Sophocles (in The Trachiniae) and Hecataeus of Miletus (who locates Oechalia near Eretria) were aligned among with those who identified this Oechalia with the Euboean location. Also, Demetrius of Scepsis placed it in Arcadia. Strabo makes mention of all these possibilities.

The site of Oechalia is at or near that of ancient Carnasium (Karnasion).
