= Ophion =

Ophion may refer to:

- Ophion (god), deity in Greek mythology
- Ophion (insect), genus of wasps
- Ophion (star cluster), large, anomalous star cluster
