= Eurybatus =

Eurybatus may refer to:

In Greek history and mythology:

- See Eurybatus (mythology), for mythological characters named Eurybatus
- Eurybatus, one of the Argonauts
- Eurybatus, one of the Cercopes
- Eurybatus, one of the commanders in the Battle of Sybota
- Eurybatus or Eurybarus, a mythological warrior
- One of a pair of chthonic tricksters who disturbed Heracles while he served Omphale
- Eurybatus of Ephesus, who betrayed Croesus to Cyrus
- Eurybatus, a leader during the Peloponnesian War

== See also ==
- Eurybates, the Achaean herald of the Iliad
