= Hercules (Handel) =

Musical Drama by George Frideric Handel

- Oratorio by George Frideric Handel
- Portrait of Handel
- Text: by Thomas Broughton
- Language: English
- Based on: Sophocles's Women of Trachis, Ovid's Metamorphoses
- Composed: 1744
- Scoring: soloists; SATB choir; orchestra

Hercules (HWV 60) is a Musical Drama in three acts by George Frideric Handel, composed in July and August 1744. The English language libretto was by the Reverend Thomas Broughton, based on Sophocles's Women of Trachis and the ninth book of Ovid's Metamorphoses.

== Performance history ==
Hercules was first given at the King's Theatre in London on 5 January 1745 in concert style. There were only two performances in the original run. The role of Lichas was written first as a small one for tenor, but it was greatly expanded before the premiere to provide Susannah Cibber with six airs. She was too ill to sing on the first night, and the music was either omitted or redistributed on that occasion. She sang in the second performance on 12 January. The music for the chorus "Wanton God" and the air "Cease, ruler of the day" was never given in this opera: the latter was adapted for the final chorus of Theodora. The work was a total failure and caused Handel to suspend his season. Hercules obtained three further hearings, two in 1749 and one in 1752, for which the role of Lichas was eliminated, and much of the other music was also cut.

Hercules was originally performed in the theatre as an oratorio without stage action. It is argued that this contributed to its later neglect as it did not make the transition into the church and the concert hall successfully. When fully staged it was reappraised and acclaimed by Romain Rolland, Henry Prunières, Paul Henry Lang and others as one of the supreme masterpieces of its age. The first modern performance was in Münster in 1925. Hercules is sometimes given a full opera staging, for example, in a Peter Sellars production at the Chicago Lyric Opera in 2011.

== Roles ==
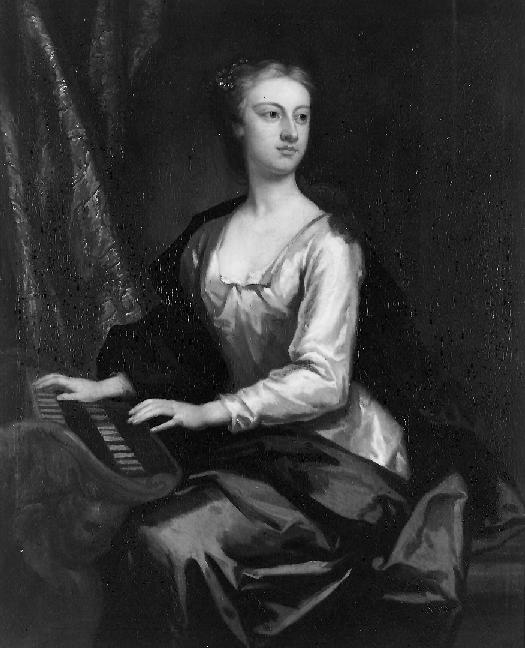
Anastasia Robinson, c. 1727, who created the role of Dejanira

Roles, voice types, and premiere cast
Role	Voice type	Premiere cast 5 January 1745
Hercules	bass	Thomas Reinhold
Dejanira, wife of Hercules	mezzo-soprano	Anastasia Robinson
Iole, daughter of the King of Oechalia	soprano	Elisabeth Duparc, called "La Francesina"
Hyllus, son of Hercules	tenor	John Beard
Lichas, a herald	contralto	Susanna Maria Cibber

== Synopsis ==
Précis: When the great hero Hercules returns to his wife Dejanira after a long absence, bringing with him as a captive the beautiful Princess Iole, Dejanira becomes consumed with jealousy. In a misguided attempt to secure her husband's fidelity, she inadvertently causes his death and goes mad.

Scene: Greece, in legendary antiquity

Years before the action of the piece, Hercules killed the centaur Nessus as he tried to rape Hercules' wife Dejanira. As he died, Nessus gave Dejanira a cloak soaked with his blood, telling her she should give it to Hercules if she ever doubted his fidelity because if Hercules donned the cloak he would never look at another woman again.

=== Act I ===
A royal apartment

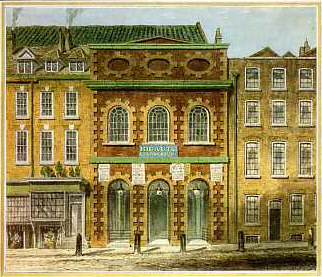
The King's Theatre in the Haymarket, where Hercules was first performed

Lichas, a royal herald, notices the inconsolable grief of Dejanira, (Accompanied recitative: See, with what sad dejection in her looks) and sympathises (Air: No longer, fate, relentless frown). Dejanira is convinced that her husband, Hercules, has been killed whilst on a military expedition that has kept him apart from her for more than a year (Accompanied recitative:O, Hercules, why art thou absent from me? and Air: The world, when day's career is run). Hyllus, son of Dejanira and Hercules, enters and reports that an oracle has been consulted and indicated that the hero is dead and the summits of Mount Oeta are ablaze with fire (Arioso:I feel, I feel the god, he swells my breast). The prophecy confirms Dejanira's fears and she longs to join her husband in death (Air:There in myrtle shades reclin'd); however Hyllus refuses to give up hope and vows to search for his father to the ends of the earth.(Air: Where congeal'd the northern streams) . The chorus comment on the devotion of Hercules' son and wife (Chorus: O filial piety, O gen'rous love!). Lichas arrives and announces that Hercules has returned alive after conquering Oechalia, much to the relief of Dejanira (Air:Begone, my fears). Lichas is glad that despair has so quickly turned to joy (Air:The smiling hours of joyful train) and the chorus reflect that one should never give up hope (Chorus:Let none despair).

A square before the Palace. Iole and Oechalian virgins, led captive

Among the captives is the princess Iole of legendary beauty. She laments the loss of her freedom (Air:Daughter of gods, bright liberty). Her predicament leaves Hyllus deeply moved. Hercules enters to a march in the orchestra. Despite having ravaged her country and sacrificed her father, Hercules reassures Iole that even though in exile, she may consider herself free. Iole cannot forget her father's death, which she witnessed, and prays that he may rest in peace (Air:My father! Ah, methinks I see). Hercules looks forward to enjoying domestic life after long martial activity (Air: The God of battle quits the bloody field). The chorus celebrates Hercules' glorious accomplishments (Chorus: Crown with festal pomp the day).

=== Act II ===
"Jealousy! Infernal pest! Tyrant of the human breast" (HWV 60)
Section performed by Les Arts Florissants

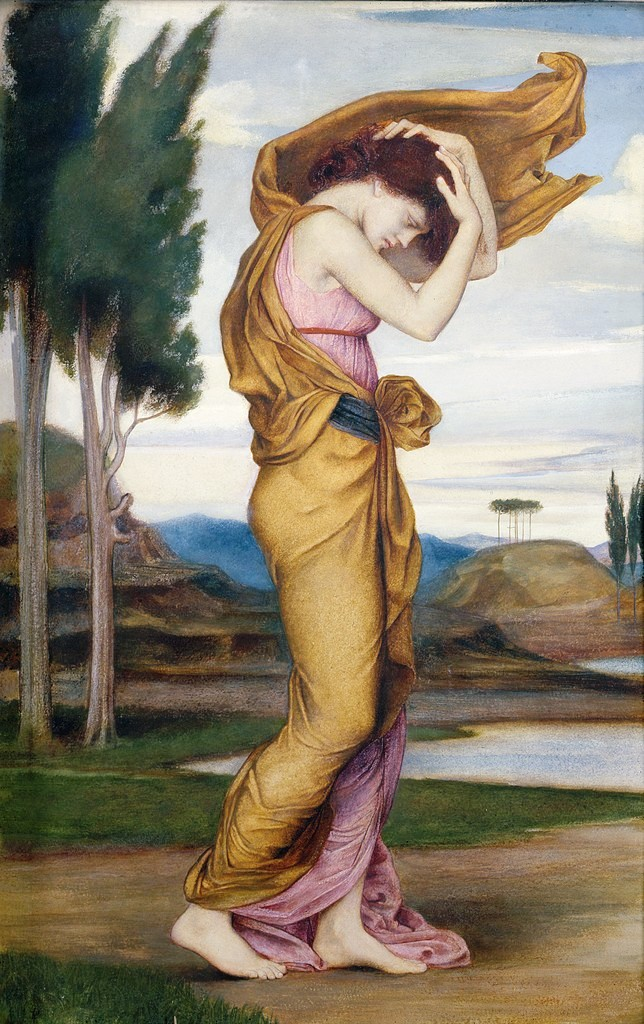
Deianira by Evelyn De Morgan

An apartment

Iole desires a simple form of happiness far removed from the machinations of power (Air: How blest the maid). Meanwhile, Dejanira [Deianera], convinced that Hercules has been unfaithful to her, believes Iole's beauty proves his betrayal (Air: When beauty sorrow's livery wears), even though her suspicions are resolutely refuted by Iole (Air: Ah, think what ills the jealous prove!). Lichas observes how Dejanira's jealousy increases (Air: As stars, that rise and disappear). The chorus reflect on the corrosive effects of jealousy (Chorus: Jealousy! Infernal pest). Hyllus, having declared his love to the captive princess, is rejected by her (Air: Banish love from thy breast), which distresses him (Air: From celestial seats descending). The chorus reflect on the power of love (Chorus:Wanton god of am'rous fires).

Another apartment

Dejanira accuses her husband of tainting his reputation, an accusation he rejects (Air: Alcides' name in latest story). She insists he has disgraced himself by becoming besotted with Iole (Air: Resign thy club and lion's spoils). Hercules advises his wife to put aside these unjust suspicions, but Dejanira is consumed with jealousy (Air: Cease, ruler of the day, to rise). When Hercules is summoned to celebrate the rites of his victory, Dejanira gives Lichas a garment for her husband as a token of reconciliation. Lichas is pleased by this apparent sign of marital harmony (Air: Constant lovers, never roving). The blood-soaked cloak, entrusted to her by the centaur Nessus as he lay dying, appears to possess the power to lead a heart back to faithfulness. Meanwhile, Dejanira takes great pains to convince Iole that she regrets her accusations (Duet: Joys of freedom, joys of pow'r). The chorus hope that the marriage of Hercules and Dejanira will be a happy one once more (Chorus: Love and Hymen, hand in hand).

=== Act III ===
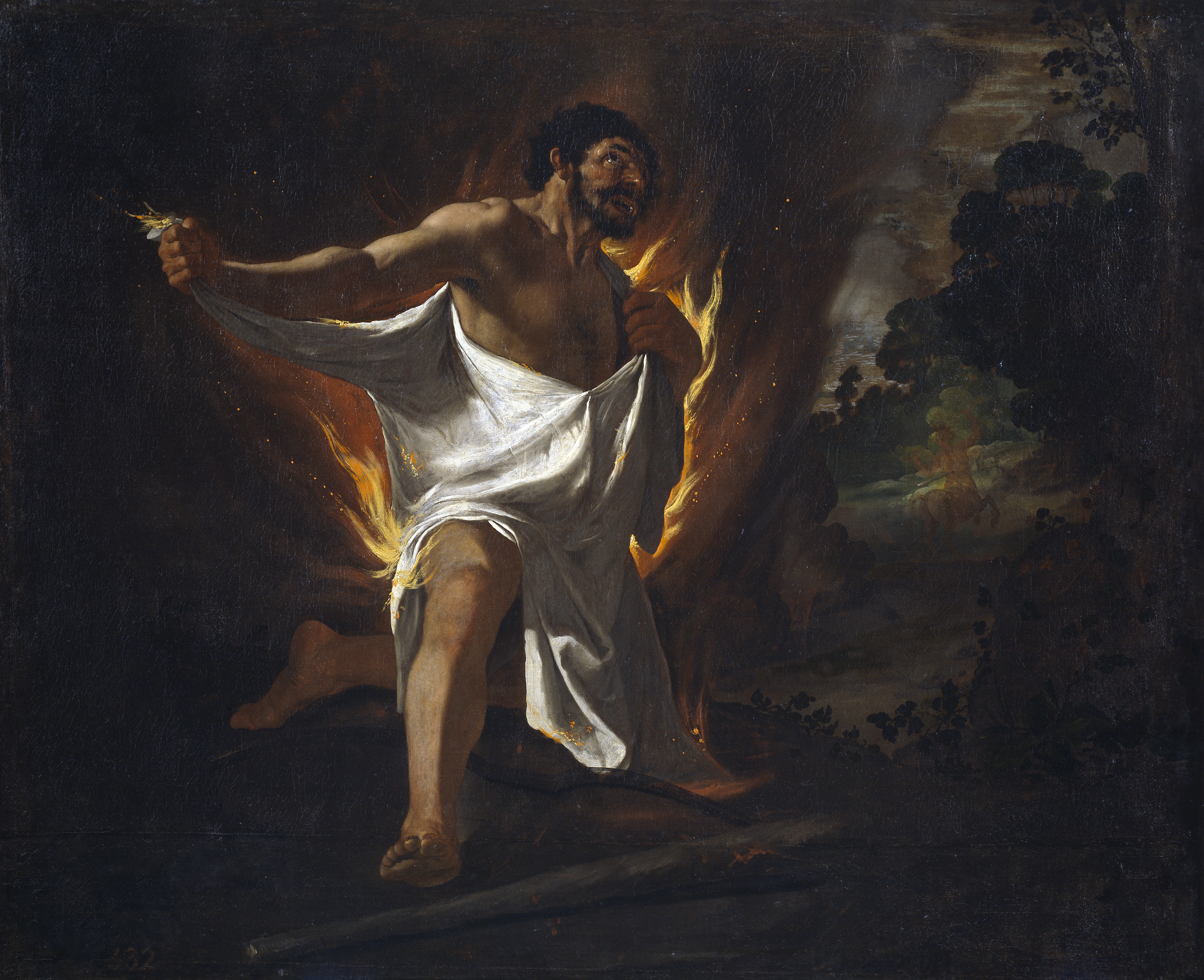
Death of Hercules (painting by Francisco de Zurbarán, 1634, Museo del Prado)

Lichas recounts how Hercules received Dejanira's gift and how the cloak was impregnated with a deadly poison which burnt and melted the flesh from his bones (Air: O scene of unexampl'd woe). The chorus lament the terrible news (Chorus: Tyrants now no more shall dread).

The Temple of Jupiter

As his son watches, Hercules dies in appalling suffering and cursing Dejanira's vengeance (Accompanied recitative: O Jove, what land is this). His last wish, that he be carried to the summit of Mount Oeta and set upon a funeral pyre, clarifies the oracle pronouncement in the first act. Hyllus hopes his father's ignominious death will not be widely known (Air: Let not fame the tidings spread).

The Palace

Dejanira, hearing of Hercules' agonising end, realises she should not have trusted the dying words of Nessus. Discovering that she has been the instrument of her beloved husband's death, she sinks into madness. (Accompanied recitative: Where shall I fly? Where hide this guilty head?) Such misfortune arouses the pity of Iole (Air: My breast with tender pity swells). A priest of Jupiter announces that Hercules has been lifted up to Olympus to join the gods there for all eternity. Hyllus pays tribute to his father's ascension to heaven (Air:He, who for Atlas propp'd the sky). Jove ordains the marriage of Hyllus and Iole, a decree that is received with joy by Hyllus and obedience by Iole (Duet: O prince, whose virtues all admire). The chorus praise the king of the gods (Chorus: To him your grateful notes of praise belong).

== Musical features ==
The mad scene for Dejanira "Where shall I fly?" is one of the highlights of the score. It contains many changes of tempo and mood, following the character's panic and despair. The chorus comment on the action after the manner of the choruses in Greek tragedy, with varied and inventive music. Some of the choruses contain massive fugues, others are "jolly" tunes. The work makes extensive use of musical chromaticism. For musicologist Paul Henry Lang, the excellence of the libretto, the masterly characterisation through music, and Handel's superlative musical invention make Hercules "the crowning glory of Baroque music drama".

== Recordings ==
=== Audio recordings ===
Hercules discography, audio recordings
Year	Cast Hercules, Dejanira, Iole, Hyllus, Lichas	Conductor, orchestra, chorus	Label
1968	Louis Quilico, Maureen Forrester, Teresa Stich-Randall, Alexander Young, Norma Lerer	Brian Priestman, Wiener Rundfunk Orchester, Wiener Akademie Chor	RCA LP Cat:SER 5569-71
1982	John Tomlinson , Sarah Walker, Jennifer Smith, Anthony Rolfe-Johnson, Catherine Denley	John Eliot Gardiner, English Baroque Soloists, Monteverdi Choir	Archiv CD Cat:2742 004
2000	Gidon Saks, Anne Sofie von Otter, Lynne Dawson, Richard Croft, David Daniels	Marc Minkowski, Les Musiciens du Louvre, Les Musiciens du Louvre	Archiv CD Cat:469 532-2
2008	Peter Kooij, Nicola Wemyss, Gerlinde Sämann, Knut Schoch, Franz Vitzthum	Joachim Carlos Martini, Barock-orchester Frankfurt, Junge Kantorei	Naxos CD Cat:8.557960-62

=== Video recording ===
Hercules discography, video recordings
Year	Cast Hercules, Dejanira, Iole, Hyllus, Lichas	Stage Director, Conductor, orchestra, chorus	Label
2005	William Shimell, Joyce DiDonato, Ingela Bohlin, Toby Spence, Malena Ernman	Luc Bondy, William Christie, Les Arts Florissants, Les Arts Florissants	Naxos DVD Cat: BAC513

== See also ==
- Ercole amante, a libretto set by both Francesco Cavalli and his student Antonia Bembo, based on Sophocles's Women of Trachis and Ovid's Metamorphoses (1707)

== Sources ==
- Hercules by Stanley Sadie, in 'The New Grove Dictionary of Opera', ed. Stanley Sadie (London, 1992) ISBN 0-333-73432-7
