= Cercopes (epic poem) =

Lost Ancient Greek poem, once attributed to Homer

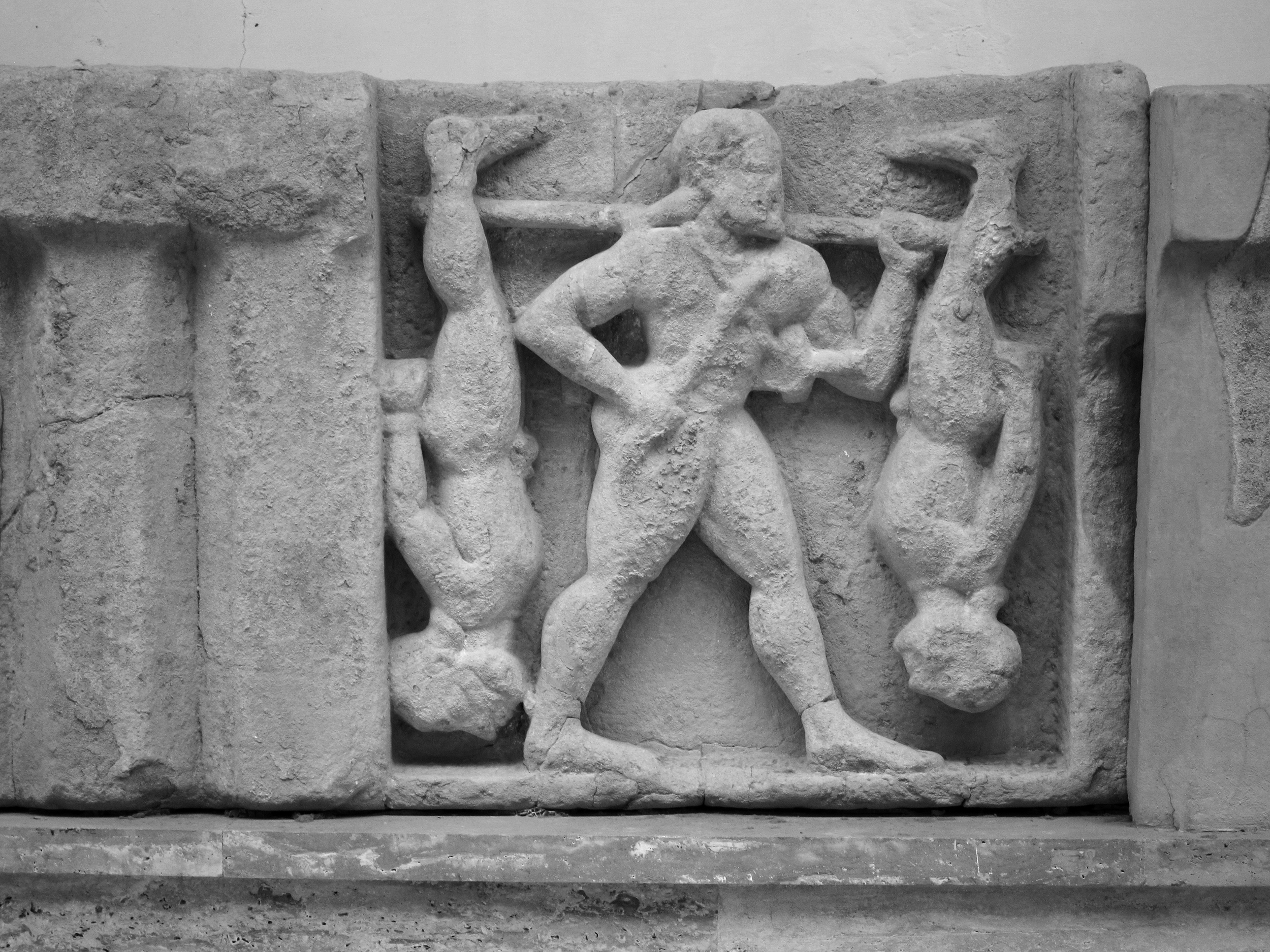
A metope depicting Heracles's punishment of the Cercopes, from a temple at Paestum in Italy

The Cercopes (Ancient Greek: Κέρκωπες; Ancient Greek pronunciation: [ˈkérkɔpɛs]) is a lost ancient Greek slapstick, mock-epic poem attributed in antiquity to Homer. Little is known of the poem, which seems to have recorded an existing mythical narrative. It concerned the Cercopes (lit. 'Tail-Faces'), (Note: Martin West alternatively translates the word as 'Dick-Faces'.) a pair of mythical monkey-men who roamed the world causing mischief, and their ill-fated encounter with the hero Heracles.

The myth of the Cecropes is known from vase-paintings first attested in the sixth century BCE. The poem probably located the Cecropes' home at Oechalia on the island of Euboea, though other writers placed it in Lydia or on the island of Pithekoussai. The ancient Life of Homer, once spuriously attributed to Herodotus, recorded a tradition that Homer had composed the Cercopes, alongside other "funny poems" (παίγνια; paignia), while a teacher of boys at Bolissos on the island of Chios, generally considered his homeland in antiquity.

The Cercopes is mentioned in the 10th-century Byzantine encyclopaedia known as the Suda, which states that one of the Cercopes was named Passalus, and the other Acmon, and they were the children of Theia and Oceanus. The Suda included the story of the Cercopes's mother Theia, the goddess of sight, who warned them to beware of the "black-buttocked one" (Μελάμπυγος; Melampygos). This was a reference to Heracles: the Cercopes attempted to steal his cattle, but he caught them and tied them upside-down from a pole. They may also have been punished by being turned into monkeys. Daniel Ogden suggests that there were parallels between the Cercopes and the character of Thersites in the Iliad, also attributed to Homer in antiquity: Thersites is an ugly, misshapen foot-soldier, punished by Odysseus for challenging the king Agamemnon.

Almost all of the contents of this poem have been lost: the surviving testimonia are published alongside Hesiod's works in the Loeb Classical Library. The Suda relates a fragment, supposedly from the poem, which reads:

ψεύστας, ἠπεροπῆας, ἀμήχανά τ᾽ ἔργα δαέντας,
ἐξαπατητῆρας: πολλὴν δ᾽ ἐπὶ γαῖαν ἰόντες
ἀνθρώπους ἀπάτασκον, ἀλώμενοι ἤματα πάντα.

Translation:

"Liars and cheats, skilled in deeds irremediable,
accomplished knaves. Far over the world they roamed –
deceiving men as they wandered continually."

The English dramatist Henry Fielding used the Cercopes as the putative basis for his 1741 satire The Vernoniad, a mock-epic denunciation of Robert Walpole, the prime minister of Great Britain. In a mock-scholarly note on his own poem, Fielding claims that the work is in fact the lost Cercopes, and makes accurate references to other classical texts, including the Suda, which narrate the story of the Cercopes.

== Bibliography ==
- Evelyn-White, Hugh (1943). Hesiod, the Homeric Hymns, and Homerica. Loeb Classical Library. Cambridge, Mass.: Harvard University Press. OCLC 1045933815.
- Goldgar, Bertrand A. (1997). "'The Learned English Dog': Fielding's Mock Scholarship". In Rivero, Albert J. (ed.). Augustan Subjects: Essays in Honor of Martin C. Battestin. Newark: University of Delaware Press. pp. 192–206. OCLC 1319182737 – via Internet Archive.
- Hadas, Moses (1950). A History of Greek Literature. New York: Columbia University Press. OCLC 1224720707.
- Jevons, Frank Byron (1908) [1886]. A History of Greek Literature: From the Earliest Period to the Death of Demosthenes. London: Charles Griffin and Company. OCLC 1046589552.
- Ogden, Daniel (1997). The Crooked Kings of Ancient Greece. London: Bloomsbury Academic. ISBN 978-0-7156-2716-7.
- Smith, William (1870). "Cercopes" . Dictionary of Greek and Roman Biography and Mythology . Boston: Little, Brown, and Company. p. 672 – via Wikisource.
- Stanley, Phillip; Johnson, Patricia (2004). Ancient Myth in Art and Literature. Dubuque: Kendall Hunt. ISBN 978-0-7575-0875-2.
- Tripp, Edward (1974). The Meridian Handbook of Classical Mythology. New York: Penguin. ISBN 978-0-452-00927-1.
- West, Martin, ed. (2003). Homeric Hymns. Homeric Apocrypha. Lives of Homer. Loeb Classical Library. Vol. 496. Cambridge, Mass.: Harvard University Press. ISBN 0-674-99606-2.
