= Pherecydes of Syros =

6th-century BCE Greek mythographer and proto-philosopher

- Φερεκύδης
- Born: c. early 6th century BCE; Syros
- Died: c. late 6th century BCE unknown

Philosophical work
- Era: Ancient Greek philosophy
- Region: Western philosophy
- Main interests: Cosmogony, mythology, theology, etymology
- Notable ideas: Metempsychosis, Time as Demiurge

Pherecydes of Syros (/fəˈrɛsɪˌdiːz/; Ancient Greek: Φερεκύδης ὁ Σύριος; fl. 6th century BCE) was an Ancient Greek mythographer and proto-philosopher from the island of Syros. Little is known about his life and death. Some ancient testimonies counted Pherecydes among the Seven Sages of Greece, although he is generally believed to have lived in the generation after them. Others claim he may have been a teacher of Pythagoras, a student of Pittacus, or a well-traveled autodidact who had studied secret Phoenician books.

Pherecydes wrote a book on cosmogony, known as the "Pentemychos" (Note: wikt:Πεντέμυχος, "of the five recesses") or "Heptamychos". (Note: "seven recesses") He was considered the first writer to communicate philosophical ideas in prose as opposed to verse. However, other than a few short fragments preserved in quotations from other ancient philosophers and a long fragment discovered on an Egyptian papyrus, his work is lost. However, it survived into the Hellenistic period and a significant amount of its content can be conjectured indirectly through ancient testimonies. His cosmogony was derived from three divine principles: Zas (Life), Cthonie (Earth), and Chronos (Time). In the narrative, Chronos creates the Classical elements and other gods in cavities within the earth. Later, Zas defeats the dragon Ophion in a battle for supremacy and throws him in Oceanus. Zas marries Chthoniê, who then becomes the recognizable Earth (Gê) with forests and mountains. Chronos retires from the world as creator, and Zas succeeds him as ruler and assigns all beings their place.

Pherecydes' cosmogony forms a bridge between the mythological thought of Hesiod and pre-Socratic Greek philosophy; Aristotle considered him one of the earliest thinkers to abandon traditional mythology in order to arrive at a systematic explanation of the world, although Plutarch, as well as many other writers, still gave him the title of theologus, as opposed to the later physiologoi of the Ionian school. Later hellenistic doxographers also considered him as one of the first thinkers to introduce a doctrine of the transmigration of souls to the Ancient Greek religion, which influenced the metempsychosis of Pythagoreanism, and the theogonies of Orphism. Various legends and miracles were ascribed to him, many of which tie him to the development of Pythagoreanism or Orphism.

== Life ==
Although it is relatively certain that Pherecydes was a native of the island of Syros, and that he lived in the 6th century BCE, almost nothing else is known about his life. There is even some discrepancy in the ancient sources of his life as to when exactly he lived within the 6th century. The Suda places his date of birth during the reign of King Alyattes in Lydia (c. 605-560 BCE), which would place him as a contemporary of the Seven Sages of Greece, (Note: DK 7A1 §122) among whose number he was occasionally included. Alternatively, Apollodorus places his floruit several decades later, in the 59th Olympiad (544–541 BCE), a generation later. Assuming that Pherecydes was born in this later generation, younger than the philosopher Thales (624-545 BC) and thus an older contemporary of Anaximander, he would also be approximately the correct age for the Pythagorean tradition in which he is regarded as a teacher of Pythagoras. Most of the other biographical information is probably fiction, and the ambiguity and contradictions in the surviving testimonies suggest that any reliable biographical data that may have existed was no longer available in the Hellenistic period. The identity of Pherecydes was also unclear in ancient times because there were two authors of that name who both wrote about mythology: Pherecydes of Syros and Pherecydes of Athens (fl. 5th century BC). (Note: For a brief enumeration, see for example Munn 2006, p. 48, note 125)

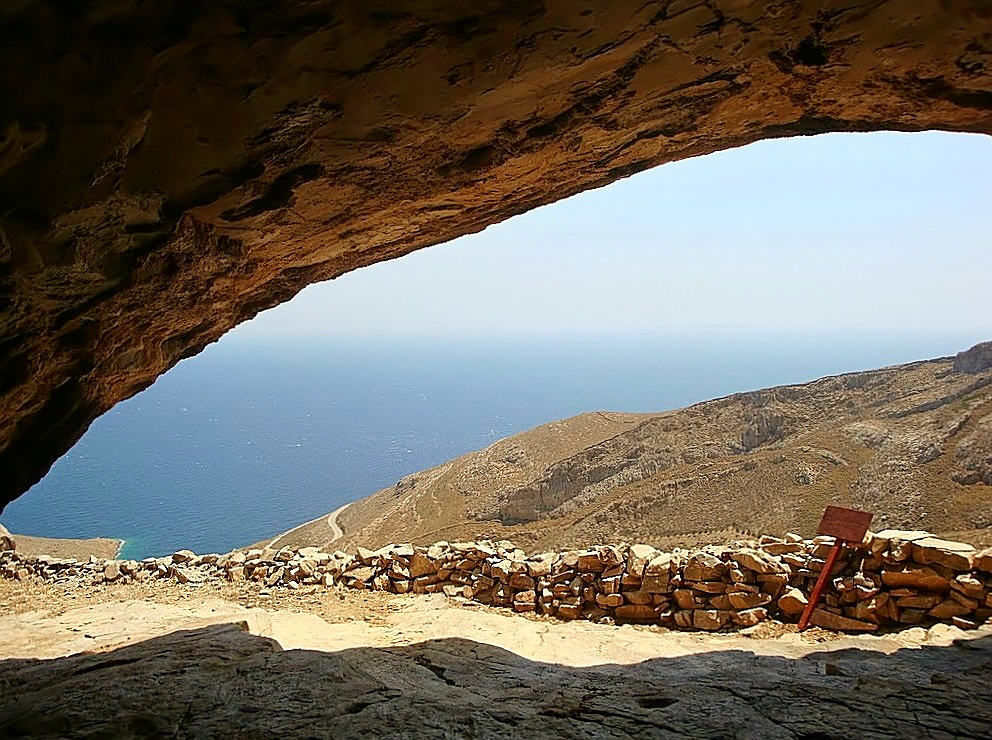
View of northern Syros from the cave of Pherecydes. Local tradition maintains that Pherecydes lived in two caves in the northern part of the island of Syros.

According to a forged letter attributed to Thales, Pherecydes never traveled (Note: Hermippus, quoted in DK 7A2a) but according to other sources he traveled throughout the Greek cultural area, to Delphi, the Peloponnese, Ephesus and Samos. According to Josephus and Byzantine writers, Pherecydes also made a journey to Egypt. Such a journey, however, is a common tale that is also part of other biographies of philosophers. A sun-dial (heliotropion), supposedly made by Pherecydes, was said by Diogenes Laërtius to be "preserved on the island of Syros." (Note: DK 7A1 §119) Several miraculous deeds were also attributed to Pherecydes; such as that he accurately predicted an earthquake on Syros after drinking from a well, or that he predicted the sinking of a ship that he saw along the coast of Syros, which then proceeded to sink. In Messene he allegedly warned his friend Perilaus that the city would be conquered. Finally, Hercules was said to have visited him in a dream and told him to tell the Spartans not to value silver or gold, and that same night Heracles is said to have told the king of Sparta in his sleep to listen to Pherecydes. (Note: DK 7A1 § 116-117.) Many of those miracles however, were also attributed to other legendary philosophers such as Pythagoras or Epimenides.

There are many conflicting legends that purport to be an account of the death of Pherecydes. According to one story, Pherecydes was killed and skinned as a sacrifice by the Spartans, and their king kept the skin out of respect for Pherecydes' wisdom. (Note: Plutarch, Pelopidas 21, 2; Agis and Cleomenes 10, 3.) However, the same story was also told about Epimenides. Other accounts have the philosopher perishing in a battle between the Ephesians and Magnesians, or throwing himself from Mount Corycus in Delphi, or succumbing to typhoid fever. (Note: DK 7A1, § 117-118) According to Aelianus typhoid fever was a punishment for his wickedness . (Note: Varia Historia, 4, 28.) The latter story was already known to Aristotle and may have arisen from the idea that wise men did not care about physical care. Other stories connect Pherecydes' death to Pythagoras. However, the historicity of all this is debatable.

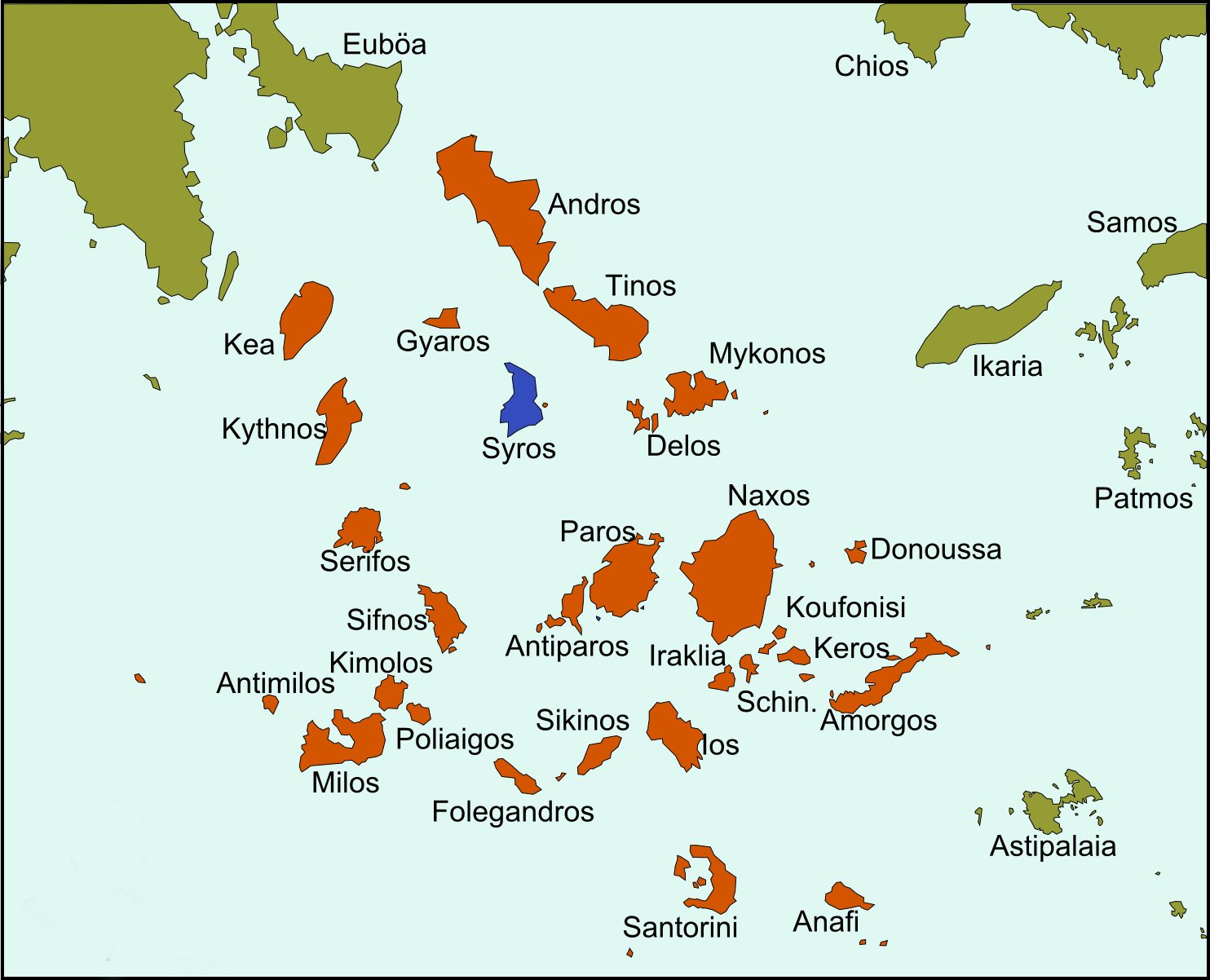
Syros, located in the Cyclades in the south Aegean was first inhabited by the Phoenicians, whose books were said to have influenced Pherecydes.

=== Influences ===
Pherecydes was designated as 'wise' (sophos), but only Servius calls him a philosopher (philosophus). (Note: Servius, In Vergilii Aeneidem commentarii, III, 76.) Aristotle places him between theologians and philosophers, because he no longer expressed himself completely mythical in his research. No consistent teacher of Pherecydes was known by name in late antiquity; according to the doxographer Diogenes Laërtius Pherecydes was taught by Pittacus, (Note: DK 7A1 § 116, Iamblichus, Life of Pythagoras, §9, § 11.) but according to the Suda he taught himself after he got his hands on 'the secret books of the Phoenicians'.

Although this latter claim is almost certainly fictitious, it may be based on the similarity between Pherecydes' ideas and Eastern religious motifs. For example, in his book he describes an important battle in the earliest times between Kronos and Ophion, and this motif occurs in the Middle East. His father was named Babys, a name that presumably originated from southern Anatolia, based on linguistic evidence. Eternal time as god is also Middle Eastern. In addition, Pherecydes has been associated with Zoroastrianism. Isidore the Gnostic claimed that Pherecydes based his allegorical work on a 'prophecy of Ham'. (Note: Clement of Alexandria, VI, 53, § 5.) Ham, as referred to here, may be Zoroaster, who was quite well known in the Greek world of late antiquity. Isidore may have concluded this because the Zoroastrian literature available to him was influenced by Hellenization, or because Pherecydes' work influenced it. There is also a short fragment in which Pherecydes talks about ambrosia of the moon, the potion of the gods. This representation has parallels in the Samaveda, where there the moon is a vessel from which the gods drink soma (god drink) and is important in the reincarnation theory as guardian of heaven.

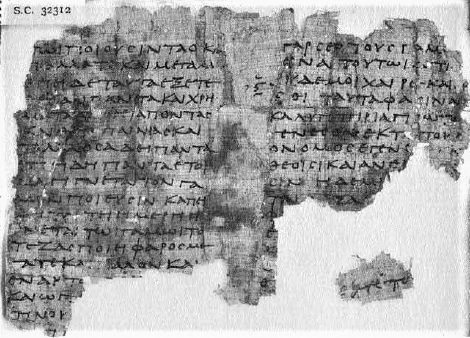
Grenfell-Hunt Papyrus, MS Gr. class. f. 48. The papyrus fragment shows two columns of Pherecydes' "Heptamychos."

=== Writings ===
Pherecydes wrote a cosmogony (explanatory model for the origin of the universe) that contained a theogony, an explanatory model for the gods and their properties. This work broke with the mythological and theological tradition and shows Eastern influences. Pherecydes, along with Anaximander and Anaximenes, has long been regarded as one of the first Greek writers to compose his work in prose rather than hexameter verse. Martin Litchfield West notes that the subject matter that all of three of these authors wrote on, the nature of the universe and how it came to be, had been written in verse prior to these authors. West speculates based on the word choice that early logographers used ("words I have heard" instead of "I have read") that the original intent of a book written in prose was essentially a "write-up" of a lecture that a person interest in topics such as cosmology gave as a speech or public discourse. The book was known variously under the titles such as Seven niches ( Heptamychos, Ἑπτάμυχος), "Five niches" (Pentemychos, Πεντέμυχος), and Mixing of the Gods (Theokrasia, Θεοκρασία).

In this work, Pherecydes taught his philosophy through the medium of mythic representations. Although it is lost, it was extant in the Hellenistic period, and the fragments and testimony that survive from works that describe it are enough to reconstruct a basic outline. The opening sentence is given by Diogenes Laertius, (Note: DK 7A1 § 119) and two fragments in the middle of the text have also been preserved in fragments from a 3rd century Egyptian papyrus discovered by Bernard Pyne Grenfell and Arthur Surridge Hunt, which was identified thanks to a comment by Clement of Alexandria about the contents of Pherecydes' book: 'Pherecydes of Syros says: "Zas made a great and beautiful robe, and made the earth and Ogenus on it, and the palace of Ogenus".'

== Theogony ==
Pherecydes developed a unique, syncretistic theogony with a new beginning stage, in which Zas, Chronos, and Chthoniê were the first gods to exist all along. He was probably the first to do this. There is no creation out of nothing (creatio ex nihilo). The cosmogony is justified through etymology, a new understanding of the deity Kronos as Chronos and the insertion of a creator god (demiurge). Also, Pherecydes combined Greek mythology with non-Greek myths and religions. According to Aristotle, he was innovative in his approach, because he broke with the theological tradition and combined mythology with philosophy. Pherecydes' creation story therefore had to be more rational and concrete than Hesiod's Theogony. He wrote that first Chaos came to be (genetos) without explanation, while Zas, Chronos and Chthoniê existed eternally (êsan aeí). The adoption of an eternal principle (arche) for the cosmos was characteristic of Pre-Socratic thinkers.

The sequence of Pherecydes' creation myth is as follows. First, there are the eternal gods Zas (Zeus), Chthoniê (Gaia) and Chronos (Kronos). Then Chronos creates elements in niches in the earth with his seed, from which other gods arise. This is followed by the three-day wedding of Zas and Chthonie. On the third day Zas makes the robe of the world, which he hangs from a winged oak and then presents as a wedding gift to Chthonie, and wraps around her. The "winged oak" in this cosmology has no precedent in Greek tradition. The stories are different but not mutually exclusive, because much is lacking in the fragments, but it seems clear that creation is hindered by chaotic forces. Before the world is ordered, a cosmic battle takes place, with Cronus as the head of one side and Ophion as the leader of the other. Ophion then attacks Kronos, who defeats him and throws him in Ogenos. Sometime after his battle with Ophion, Kronos is succeeded by Zas. This is implied by the fact that Zas/Zeus is ultimately the one who assigns the gods their domain in the world. For example, the Harpies are assigned to guard Tartarus The fact that Kronos disappears into the background is due to his great magnificence. The argument for this is that Aristotle conceives Pherecydes as a semi-philosopher in that he connects the philosophical Good and Beautiful with the first, prevailing principle (arche) of the theologians, and eternity, according to Aristotle, is connected with the good. The three primordial gods are eternal, equal and wholly responsible for the world order.

=== Etymology ===
Pherecydes was interested in etymology and word associations. Like Thales, he associated chaos with the primordial elemental water, presumably because he associates the word 'chaos' with the verb 'cheesthai', 'to flow out', and because chaos is an undefined, disorderly state. By that approach he adapted god names, although Pherecydes probably saw his gods as traditional deities. He mentioned Rhea for example Rhê, presumably by association with rhein '(out)streams'. The common names were in the 6th century BC. already traditional. In addition, the names are not a Greek dialect. The reason for deviant forms is to make them resemble other words and to construct an original form.

- Zas resembles Zeus. One explanation is association with the prefix za- 'very', as in zatheos 'very divine'. An alternative is that the Sky deity is thus connected with the Earth Goddess Gê. Namely, the Cypriot form is Zã. A third interpretation is based on the genitive form Zantos. Pherecydes' father Babys came from Cilicia, where the Luwian god Šanta was known as Sandes and Sandon. The Hittites identified it as the sky god, and the Greeks as Zeus or Heracles. Based on Zeus and Sandon with their associations, Pherecydes constructed a basic form with Zas-Zantos. Zas (Zeus) is comparable with the Orphic Eros in function, as a personification of masculine sexual creativity. According to Proclus, "Pherecydes used to say that Zeus changed into Eros when about to create, for the reason that, having created the world from opposites, he led it into agreement and peace and sowed sameness in all things, and unity that interpenetrates the universe".
- Chronos as time, the creator god, was unusual and is probably Eastern in origin. Phoenician myths and Zoroastrianism have a deified Time (Zurvan) that also creates without a partner with its seed, but leaves the concrete design of the physical world to another god. The semen (seeds) of Chronos which can probably be considered as a watery chaos was placed in the recesses and composed numerous other offspring of gods. This is described in a fragment preserved in Damascius' On First Principles. In later Greek poetry, Chronos (also called Aiōn) appears as personification. Some Pherecydes fragments say Kronos, not Chronos. The association between the two figures is not traditional but may be correct. According to Hermias and Probus, Pherecydes did connect Chronos with Kronos, perhaps on etymological grounds. (Note: DK 7A9 Also, Hermias, Irrisio gentilium philosophorum, 12.) After him Pindar (Note: Tenth Olympic ode, 49-55.) and Hellenistic orphism did this too.
- Chthoniê comes from chthôn 'earth' and chthonios 'in/under the earth'. It concerns the invisible part of the dark, primitive earth mass. Gê, on the other hand, refers to the visible, differentiated Earth's surface. Chthoniê's role is related to myths about Cybele in western Anatolia. Herodotus uses chthoniai theai as a name for Demeter (mother earth) and her daughter Persephone. Pherecydes probably regarded Chthoniê as 'mother of the gods'. Hesiod described Tartaros as being "in a recess (muchos) of broad-wayed earth". Hermann S. Schibli thinks the five muchoi were actually harboured within Chthonie, or at least were so initially when Chronos disposed his seed in the five "nooks". A close relationship is thought to exist between these recesses and Chthonie.
- Ogenos, Okeanos/Oceanus. This non-Greek name is explained by the Akkadian uginna(circle) because Oceanus encircles the earth, or with the Aramaic ôganâ 'basin' or ôgen 'edge/band/edging'. This Eastern influence has been suggested by assuming that Pherecydes knew of a world map such as the Babylonian world map. Finally, the non-traditional Greek "abodes of Ogenos" ("Ogenou dómata") are parts of the earth covering Chthoniê, and resemble the regions beyond the ocean on the Babylonian map.

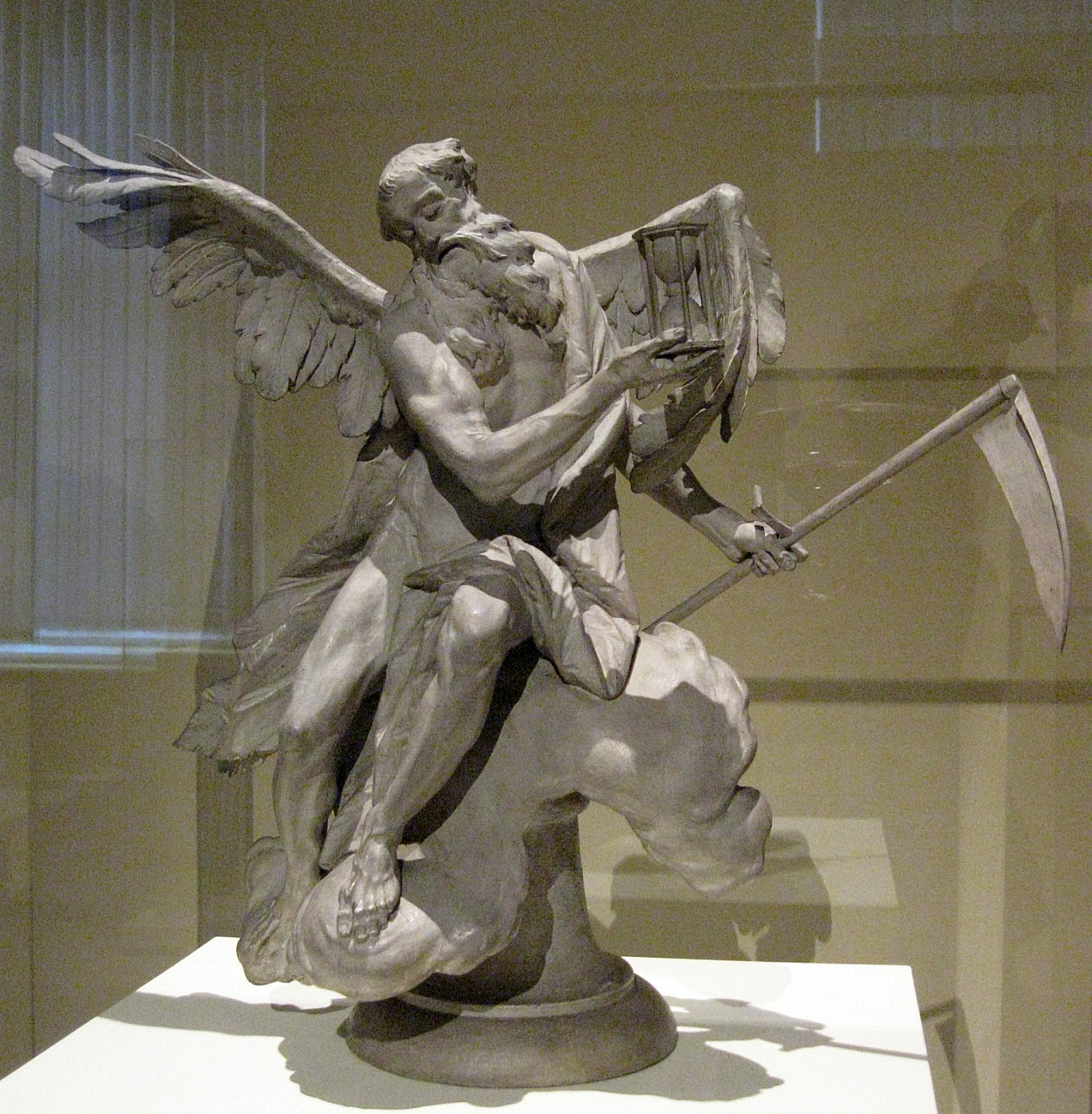
Chronos, one of the primordial deities, is the personification of time. Pherecydes was one of the first mythographers in the ancient greek religion to personify time.

=== Cosmogony ===
The sequence of Pherecydes' cosmogony begins with the eternal gods Zas (Zeus), Chthoniê (Gê) and Chronos (Kronos), who "always existed." The first creation is an act of ordering in the cosmos through niches and division of the world. That creation coincides with the dichotomy of eternity-temporality and being-becoming. Chronos must step out of eternity to create, and creation means becoming. Later on Plato also used the distinction between eternal being and temporal genesis. (Note: Timaeus) This is opposed to the older cosmogony of Hesiod (8th–7th century BCE) where the initial state of the universe is Chaos, a dark void considered as a divine primordial condition and the creation is ex nihilo (out of nothing).

The titles Penta-/Heptamychos and Theokrasia of the work indicate that niches (mychoi) and mixing are an important part of the creation story. Pherecydes first identified five niches (mychoi). If there were five niches in the story, they correspond to the five parts ( moirai) of the cosmos: the sea, underworld and heaven (the homeric three-part division), plus the earth and Mount Olympus. Therefore Damascius calls the five niches 'five worlds' and the Suda mentions the alternative title Pentamychos. Once Chronos fills them to create the worlds, they turn into the five cosmic regions ("moirai") Uranus ("heaven"), Tartarus, Chaos, Ether/Aer (“sky”) and Nyx (“night”). According to Porphyry, there were all kinds of caves and gates in the world. In classical antiquity caves were associated with sexuality and birth. However, the niches here are not stone caves in mountains, because the world has yet to be shaped. They are cavities in the still primitive, undifferentiated mass of the Earth. At an early stage, Chronos creates with his seed the three elements fire, air (pneuma) and water. The Earth element already existed with Chthoniê. Warmth, humidity and 'airiness' were according to Ancient Greek medicine three properties of seed, and through those principles the embryo developed. The first three concepts are traditional and appear in the Pherecydes fragments (eg fragment DK 7 B4 below). Poets like Probus and Hermias, equated Pherecydes' Zas with Aether because since Zeus is the Greek sky god, he would have had Aether as his domain. The title Heptamychos in the Suda is explained by including Gê and Ogenos (hepta = seven). Pherecydes writes that Tartarus lies below the earth ("gê"), so that gê is therefore considered a separate region that could be seen.

Fire, air and water are placed in the niches by Chronos and mixed (krasis). Mixing elements in five niches only makes sense if those mixtures are in different proportions. Contrary to later philosophy of Anaxagoras, the world is not created from the mixtures, but a second generation of gods (theokrasia), including Ophion. The formed gods derive their characteristics from the dominant element in each mixture and possibly associate them with the five regions. The elements may also be a later, stoic reinterpretation of the text, as the elements, especially air/pneuma, appear anachronistic and fit within Aristotelian and Stoic physiology. That means Chronos' seed will go straight into the niches. This representation is possible, because in a scholium at the Iliad, for example, it says that Chronos smeared two eggs with his seed and gave it to Hera. She had to keep the eggs underground (kata gês) so that Typhon was born, the enemy of Zeus. Typhon is a parallel of Pherecydes' serpent god Ophion.

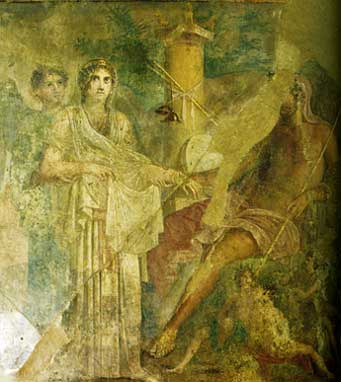
Fresco from Pompeii depicting the heiros gamos of Zeus and Hera, where Zeus presents a pharos to his betrothed, a popular motif in Ancient Roman art. The story is retold in Pherecydes' cosmogony

=== Marriage between Zas and Chthoniê ===
It is quite possible that in the course of the theogony the primeval trio changed into the traditional Zeus, Kronos and Hera. Such changes have Orphic parallels: Rhea is Demeter after she becomes Zeus' mother, (Note: Excerpt 145 by Proclus: 'She used to be Rhea, but as soon as she was called the mother of Zeus she became Demeter'.) and Phanes simultaneously becomes Zeus and Eros. In Pherecydes, Chthoniê becomes Gê through marriage, after which she becomes the protector of the marriage, and that was traditionally the domain of Hera. Hera is also associated with the earth in some sources. (Note: Homeric hymn to Apollo 351 ff. Stesichorus in Etymologicum magnum 772, 50. Virgil, Aeneid, IV, 166.)

The marriage of the gods is a union (hieros gamos) where Zas makes a robe (pharos) depicting Gaia and Ogenos. This is an allegory for the acts of creation (mellonta dêmiourgein). Zas is a demiurge and creates by turning into Eros. (Note: DK 7B3: 'Pherecydes once said that Zeus had turned into Eros when he wanted to create'. Also Maximus of Tyre, IV, 4.) The robe is a covering, namely of Chthoniê, the earth's mass, thus taking as its domain the varied surface of the earth and the encircling ocean. Marriage is also etiological, because it explains the origin of the ritual unveiling of the bride (anakalypteria). The cloth makes Chthoniê vivid and alive. She is the base matter, but Gê is the form of it.

The robe hangs on a winged oak. (Note: Isidore the Gnostic, quoted by Clement of Alexandria (DK 7B2) Maximus of Tyre, IV, 4.) This passage is unique and has several interpretations. The robust oak was traditionally dedicated to Zeus and presumably indicates the solid structure and foundation of the earth. The roots and branches support the earth's surface. Below is Tartarus, and above it, according to Hesiod, grow "the roots of the earth and the barren sea". (Note: Hesiod, Theogony, 726ff.) Pherecydes followed this archaic representation. (Note: According to Celsus, by Origen, Against Celsus, VI, 42 (DK 7B5).) The wings refer to the broad spreading branches of the oak. Over this hangs the cloth, which as the earth's surface is thus both smooth and varied in shape. The robe as a mythical image for the earth's surface also appears in some Orphic texts. In the Homeric Hymn to Demeter, Persephone is weaving a rich robe representing the cosmos when she is carried off by Hades to the underworld.Finally, the proverb 'The face of the earth is the garment of Persephone' is in the style of early Pythagoreans, who had sayings like 'tears of Zeus' for rain and 'The sea is the tear of Kronos'.

The mythical images of the tree as an earthly structure and a robe as a gift at marriage have Greek cultic counterparts. In Plataeae, for example, the Daedala festival was celebrated, in which an oak was cut down to make a statue of a girl dressed as a bride. Zeus gave Persephone Sicily or Thebes, while Cadmus gave a robe to Harmonia. Still, the images may be oriental in origin. There are Mesopotamian parallels of the palace with a complex of spaces reserved for the bride and groom is built. There are also myths such as the one in which Anu takes heaven as his portion, whereupon Enlil takes the earth and gives it as a dowry to Ereshkigal, 'mistress of the great deep' (chthoniê).

=== Theomachy ===
Pherecydes described a battle between Kronos and Ophion similar to that of Zeus and Typhon in Hesiod's older "Theogony". The stake of the battle is cosmic supremacy and is reminiscent of the Titanomachy and Gigantomachy of traditional theogony, in which the successive conflicts between gods are described with the current world order as a result. In Pherecydes' cosmogony, however, no initial chaos or tyranny is overcome, followed by the establishment of a new order. The creative gods are eternal and co-equal. Their order is temporarily threatened by Ophion, but that threat becomes a (re)affirmation of the divine order, with Kronos as the first king. (Note: Tertullian, The corona, 7 (DK 7B4).) The battle is also etiological, for it explained the myths about ancient sea monsters in both Greece and Asia Minor and the Middle East. The battle is described by Celsus: (Note: DK 7B4. Also Maximus of Tyre, IV, 4.)

'Pherecydes told the myth that an army was lined up against army, and he mentioned Kronos as leader of one, Ophion of the other, and he related their challenges and struggles, and that they agreed that the one who fell into Ogenos was the loser, while those who cast them out and conquered should possess the sky'.

Chronos has become Kronos here. Presumably, as a prominent second creator, Zas also participates in the battle, after which he becomes Zeus. Ophion did not exist from the beginning but was born and had progeny of his own ( Ophionidai). (Note: In a scholium with Aristophanes' Clouds, 247, a first race of gods under Ophion and Eurynome is also mentioned.) He is serpentine, because his name is derived from ophis 'snake'. Traditionally, Gaia (Gê) was regarded as the mother of Typhon, and Chthoniê/Gê may be the mother of Ophion here. Ophion may also have been produced on her own in Tartarus, the cave under the earth. Typhon also originated in a cave. Otherwise the father may be Chronos, because his seed is the niches of the earth.

Ophion and its brood are often depicted as ruling the birthing cosmos for some time before falling from power. The chaotic forces are eternal and cannot be destroyed; instead they are thrown out from the ordered world and locked away in Tartaros in a kind of "appointment of the spheres", in which the victor (Zeus-Cronus) takes possession of the sky and of space and time. Cronus (or Zeus in the more popularly known version) orders the offspring out from the cosmos to Tartaros. There they are kept behind locked gates, fashioned in iron and bronze. We are told about chaotic beings put into the pentemychos, and we are told that the Darkness has an offspring that is cast into the recesses of Tartaros. No surviving fragment makes the connection, but it is possible that the prison-house in Tartaros and the pentemychos are ways of referring to the essentially same thing. According to Celsus, Pherecydes said that: "Below that portion is the portion of Tartaros; the daughters of Boreas (the north wind), the Harpies and Thuella (Storm), guard it; there Zeus banished any of the gods whenever one behaves with insolence." Thus the identity between Zeus' prison-house and the pentemychos seems likely. Judging from some ancient fragments Ophion is thrown into Oceanus, not into Tartaros. Exactly what entities or forces that were locked away in Pherecydes’ story cannot be known for sure. There may have been five principal figures. Ophion and Typhon are one and the same, and Eurynome fought on the side of Ophion against Cronus. Chthonie is a principal "thing" of the underworld, but whether she is to be counted as one of the five or the five "sum-total" is an open question. Apart from these it is known that Ophion-Typhon mated with Echidna, and that Echidna herself was somehow mysteriously "produced" by Callirhoe. If Pherecydes counted five principal entities in association the pentemychos doctrine, then Ophion, Eurynome, Echidna, Calirrhoe and Chthonie are the main contenders.

== Legacy ==
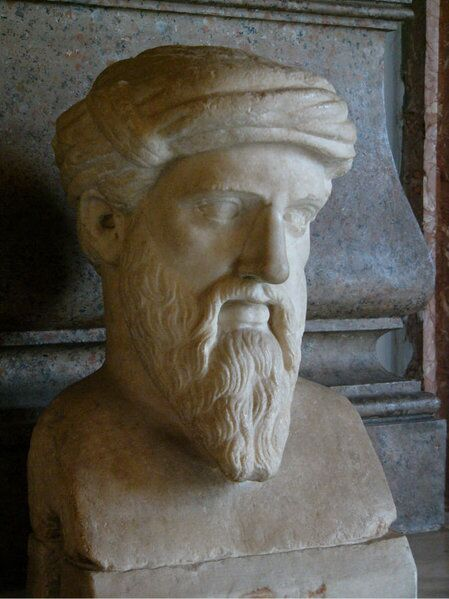
Pythagoras was alleged Pherecydes' apprentice. According to tradition, he nursed him during his illness until his death, after which he buried him on Delos.

Pherycydes is seen as a transitional figure between the mythological cosmogonies of Hesiod and the first pre-Socratic philosophers. Aristotle wrote in his Metaphysics that Pherecydes was partially a mythological writer and Plutarch, in his Parallel Lives, (Note: Plutarch, Sulla 36) instead wrote of him being a theologian. Pherecydes contributed to pre-Socratic philosophy of nature by denying that nothing comes from nothing and describing the mixture of three elements. Mixture (krasis) plays a role in later cosmologies, such as that of Anaxagoras, Plato (Timaeus) and in the Orphic poem Krater attributed to the Pythagorean philosopher Zopyrus of Tarentum.

=== Pythagoreanism ===
Out of all of the philosophers who were historical predecessors of Pythagoras, Pherycydes was the philosopher most often linked with him as one of his teachers. Not many prose treatises existed in the 6th century, Pythagoras may have learned of Pherecydes' work and adopted the idea of reincarnation. In Pythagoras' youth, when he still lived on Samos, he is said to have visited Pherecydes on Delos and later buried him. (Note: Aristotle, fragment 611.32, also fragment 191. Aristoxenus, On Pythagoras and his followers, mentioned in DK 7A1, § 118. Also Dicaearchus.) An early variant of this story places this event later in Pythagoras' life when he lived in Croton. His visit to the sick Pherecydes was used to explain his absence during Cylon's rebellion in that city. These stories may have evolved from the story that Pythagoras was a student of Pherecydes. According to Apollonius, Pythagoras imitated Pherecydes in his 'miracles'. (Note: Apollonius Paradoxographus, Historiae Mirabiles, 6.) The historicity of the connection between the two has been debated, however, because their philosophies are otherwise unrelated, and because Pythagoras has been attributed all kinds of teachers over time. The confusion among later authors about the attribution of the miracles can perhaps be traced back to the poem of Ion of Chios. (Note: The poem is given in DK 7A1 § 120.) Aristotle nevertheless stated in the 4th century BC that both were friends, and the story already about their friendship certainly dates back to the 5th century BC. It is believed that both philosophers once met.

Pherecydes' book was thought to have contained a mystical esoteric teaching, treated allegorically. A comparatively large number of sources say Pherecydes was the first to teach the Pythagorean doctrine of metempsychosis, the transmigration of human souls. Both Cicero and Augustine thought of him having given the first teaching of the "immortality of the soul". The Christian Apponius mentioned Pherecydes' belief in metempsychosis in his argument against murder and executions because a good life is rewarded and a bad life is punished in the afterlife. (Note: Apponius, In Canticum Canticorum, 3, 5.) The Middle Platonist Numenius, like Apponius, referred to the idea that the soul enters the body through the seed, and mentions a river in Pherecydes' representation of the underworld. (Note: Numenius, quoted by Porphyry, DK 7B7) The Neoplatonist Porphyry added 'corners, pits, caves, doors and gates' through which souls travel. Finally, the orator Themistius reported that Pherecydes, like Pythagoras, considered killing a great sin. (Note: Themistius, Orationes, 2, 38a-b.) This suggests that impure deeds in a next life or after death must be expiated. Pherecydes may have regarded the soul as at least an immortal part of the sky or aether. That he was the first to teach such a thing is doubtful, but Schibli concludes that Pherecydes like "included in his book ["Pentemychos"] at least a rudimentary treatment of the immortality of the soul, its wanderings in the underworld, and the reasons for the soul’s incarnations".

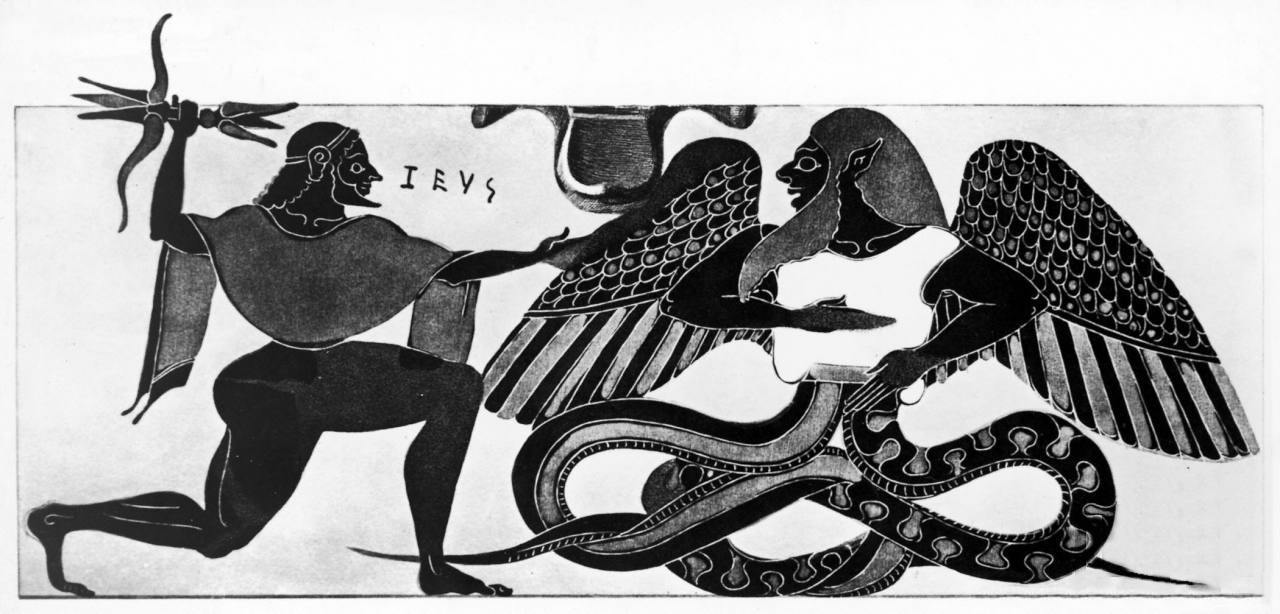
The battle between the sky god and dragon described by Pherecydes, as well as Hesiod in his Theogony is a widespread motif with Eastern parallels, such as Marduk-Tiamat and Anzu-Ninurta

=== Similarities with other cosmogonies ===
The theogony of Pherecydes also shows similarities with Orphic texts such as the Orphic Hymns. Both feature primordial serpents, the weaving of a cosmic robe and eternal Time as god who creates with his own seed by masturbation. Such Orphic aspects also appear in Epimenides' Theogony. Pherecydes probably influenced the early Orphics, or possibly an earlier sect of Orphic practitioners influenced him. The battle between Kronos and Ophion also influenced the Bibliotheca of pseudo-Apollodorus, who drew on several previous theogonies, such as those of Hesiod and the Orphic religion. The story was also a source for the Argonautica by Apollonius of Rhodes, in which Orpheus sings about Ophion and Eurynome who were overthrown by Kronos and Rhea. The association of Kronos with Chronos by the Greeks can probably also be traced back to Pherecydes. There are also many significant parallels between Pherecydes's cosmogony, Orphic theogonies, and the preserved accounts of Zoroastrian, Phoenician and Vedic cosmogonies. According to West, these myths have a common source that originates in the Levant. The basic form is as follows. In the beginning there is no heaven and no earth, but a limitless abyss of water, shrouded in deep darkness. This condition has existed for centuries. Then the hermaphrodite and eternal Time makes love to itself. Thus he produces an egg. From that egg appears a radiant creator god, who made it heaven and earth.
