= Thomas Broughton (writer) =

Thomas Broughton (1704–1774), was an English clergyman, biographer, and miscellaneous writer, whose works include the libretto to Handel's Hercules.

== Early life ==
He was born in London on 5 July 1704, the second child of John Broughton DD, who died in 1720, and his wife Mary Rutty. His father had given up a Fellowship at Christ's College, Cambridge in 1701, a prerequisite at this time for marriage; and had a position as lecturer or reader in St Andrew's, Holborn, from 1706. In 1703 he added a polemical work Psychologia to the controversial literature directed against William Coward's Second Thoughts Concerning the Human Soul, also referencing John Locke. There was a reply from Samuel Bold.

Broughton was educated at the school of St Andrew's, Holborn, and at Eton College from 1716 to 1720. He then attended St Paul's School, London. He matriculated at Gonville and Caius College, Cambridge, having financial support through the Sons of the Clergy and gaining a scholarship that lasted until 1729, where he graduated B.A. in 1727. He graduated M.A in 1730.

== Priest ==
Broughton was ordained deacon by Richard Reynolds, Bishop of Lincoln. Reynolds was a Whig in politics, and as a diocesan bishop faced issues of poorly educated candidates for the priesthood, and parishes with low incomes; in July 1727 he ordained Broughton to Offley, Hertfordshire, where that year Thomas Osborn(e) came in as vicar. In November 1727 Broughton took up a post in London as reader at the Temple Church. He was ordained priest in 1728, according to Biographia Britannica by Edmund Gibson, likewise a Whig.

Suffering from a speech impediment, Broughton initially struggled for acceptance at the Temple Church. He undertook a course of speech therapy as it existed at the period. William Downing's 1739 account of the Middle Temple explained his duties as reading the service twice a day. The Inner Temple and Middle Temple alternated in making the appointment; Broughton was given a chamber in the Middle Temple, and £20 a year.

In 1738 Broughton was appointed lecturer at St Ethelburga's Bishopsgate, a position he held to 1757. In 1739 he became rector of Stepington (Stibbington), then in Huntingdonshire; the patron, the Duke of Bedford, also appointing him one of his chaplains.

Through the influence of Thomas Sherlock, Master of the Temple and also Bishop of Salisbury, Broughton in 1744 was presented to the vicarage of Bedminster, near Bristol, with the chapels of St Mary Redcliffe, St. Thomas, and Abbot's Leigh annexed; he was a prebendary of Salisbury Cathedral. The altarpiece triptych known as Sealing the Tomb by William Hogarth was a 1755 commission for St Mary Redcliffe, made by the church council.

Thomas Broughton died on 21 December 1774 in Bristol.

== Writing ==
In 1732 Broughton published a controversial work against Christianity as Old as the Creation from 1730 by Matthew Tindal, a deist proponent of the primacy of natural religion over Christian revelation. In three volumes, his Christianity Distinct from the Religion of Nature won him immediate approval in the Inns of Court, and subsequent preferment in the Church.

Broughton was a versatile writer. His works included the following:

- Bibliotheca historico-sacra (two volumes, 1737–9) on world religions, reissued in 1742 as Historical Dictionary of all Religions from the Creation of the World to the Present Times, a single volume.
- The Temple of Taste (1734), English translation of Voltaire's Le Temple du goût (1733 edition), verse. Attributed to Broughton, it was "free, sometimes incorrect". Its provenance may have been via Nicolas-Claude Thiriot, and there were some notes of explanation. Further editions appeared in Glasgow.
- A translation of part of Pierre Bayle's Dictionnaire Historique et Critique.
- A revision for Protestant use of "Dorrell" (the Jesuit William Darrell), a Catholic devotional book on set Sunday readings from the New Testament.
- Original Poems and Translations (1743), an edition of miscellaneous works of John Dryden.
- Fifteen Sermons on Select Subjects (1778), posthumous.

He contributed 120 articles—the lives marked "T"—in the first edition of Biographia Britannica.

John Hawkins, in his Life of Johnson, credits Broughton with being the real translator of Jarvis's Don Quixote:

The fact is that Jarvis laboured at it many years, but could make but little progress, for being a painter by profession, he had not been accustomed to write, and had no style. Mr. Tonson, the bookseller, seeing this, suggested the thought of employing Mr. Broughton . . . who sat himself down to study the Spanish language, and in a few months acquired, as was pretended, sufficient knowledge thereof to give to the world a translation of "Don Quixote" in the true spirit of the original, and to which is prefixed the name of Jarvis.

=== Librettist ===
Broughton knew Handel; an article by Mark Hatcher suggests that Broughton may have invited him to play the Temple Church organ.

Broughton wrote a libretto based on Women of Trachis by Sophocles and the ninth book of Ovid's Metamorphoses for the drama Hercules, first performed at the Haymarket in 1745. Handel's biographer, Paul Henry Lang, praises Broughton's libretto for its "good theatrical sense" and the way in which it peels away extraneous elements of the narrative, to concentrate on the central drama of jealousy. It remained close to its classical sources, while expanding the role of Iole.

== Family ==
Broughton married in 1750 Anne Harris, daughter of the Rev. Thomas Harris, schoolmaster of his parish. They had seven children, six of whom survived him.

- Mary married Samuel Edwards (died 1815), a partner in Bristol Old Bank.
- Arthur Broughton (c.1758–1796), youngest child, was a physician and botanist.

One of the daughters married the printer John Rudhall (died 1803), owner of Felix Farley's Bristol Journal, and died in 1823. Rudhall was an associate of Thomas Chatterton, and some early verse by Chatteron appeared in the Journal. He had a son John Broughton Rudhall; John Mathew Gutch bought the Journal in 1803, and John Broughton Rudhall ran it with him, until 1807.
