= Phaedrias =

Phaedrias or Phaidrias (Ancient Greek: Φαιδρίας) was a town of ancient Arcadia. Phaedrias was on the road between Megalopolis and Carnasium.

Its site is unlocated.
