= Apollodorus mythographus =

Apollodorus mythographus may refer to:

- Apollodorus of Athens (born circa 180 BC), Athenian writer.
- Apollodorus, the author of the Bibliotheca, sometimes called Pseudo-Apollodorus, to distinguish him from Apollodorus of Athens (above), with whom he was sometimes confused.
