= Hestiaea =

Hestiaea of Alexandria, also Hestiaea (Ancient Greek: Ἑστιαῖα), was a scholar who wrote a treatise on Homer's Iliad that discussed the question whether the Trojan War was fought near the city then called Ilium, and which was cited by Demetrius of Scepsis. None of her work is extant.

== Biography ==
Hestiaea is variously believed to have lived in the ancient Greek city Alexandria Troas, on the Aegean Sea in modern Turkey, or in Alexandria in Egypt.

Hestiaea correctly realised that the plain lying between Ilium and the Mediterranean Sea was a comparatively recent deposit, and therefore questioned the Homeric view that this plain was the site of the Trojan War. Her opinion influenced Demetrius of Scepsis, who cited her as a source. According to the Homer scholar J. V. Luce, writing in Celebrating Homer's Landscapes: Troy and Ithaca Revisited, neither Hestiaea nor Demetrius would have accepted the view espoused by the inhabitants of Ilium that their city marked the location of ancient Troy.

Strabo mentions Hestiaea in his Geography (XIII.1.36, C599): "Demetrius cites also Hestiaea of Alexandreia as a witness, a woman who wrote a work on Homer's Iliad and inquired whether the war took place round the present Ilium and the Trojan Plain, which latter the poet places between the city and the sea; for, she said, the plain now to be seen in front of the present Ilium is a later deposit of the rivers." She is also credited in the medieval commentaries on the Iliad and on Hesiod's Works and Days for one of several explanations of the poetic epithet "golden Aphrodite": "Hestiaea the grammarian says that in Egypt there is a plain called Golden where Aphrodite is worshipped." "Hestiaea the grammarian says that the plain where Aphrodite's temple stands is called Golden: that is why it is the 'temple of Golden Aphrodite'." Apart from these three short citations, nothing now survives from Hestiaea's treatise on the Iliad.

== In popular culture ==
Hestiaea is one of the 1038 women named in Judy Chicago's art installation The Dinner Party. She is included in the Heritage Floor.

== See also ==
- Homer
- List of women in the Heritage Floor
- Strabo
