= Andania =

Andania Ανδανία
- Municipal unit
- Location within the regional unit

- Location within Greece
- Coordinates: 37°17′N 21°57′E
- Country: Greece
- Administrative region: Peloponnese
- Regional unit: Messenia
- Municipality: Oichalia

Area
  - Municipal unit: 88.7 km^{2} (34.2 sq mi)

Population (2021)
  - Municipal unit: 1,820
  - Municipal unit density: 20.5/km^{2} (53.1/sq mi)
- Time zone: UTC+2 (EET)
  - Summer (DST): UTC+3 (EEST)
- Vehicle registration: ΚΜ

Andania (Greek: Ανδανία) is a former municipality in Messenia, Peloponnese, Greece. Since the 2011 local government reform, it has been a municipal unit of the municipality of Oichalia. The municipal unit has an area of 88.694 km^{2}. Population 1,820 (2021). The seat of the municipality was in Diavolitsi.

== History ==
Anciently, Andania (Ancient Greek: Ἀνδανία) was a town of ancient Messenia, and was the capital of the kings of the race of the Leleges. It was celebrated as the birthplace of Aristomenes, but towards the end of the Second Messenian War, it was deserted by its inhabitants, who took refuge in the strong fortress of Ira. From this time it was only a village. Livy describes it as a parvum oppidum ("little town"), and Pausanias, who extols the mysteries celebrated there, saw only its ruins when he visited in the second century. It was situated on the road leading from Messene to Megalopolis. The Homeric Oechalia is identified by Strabo with Andania, but by Pausanias with Carnasium, which was only 8 stadia from Andania.
