= Pherecydes of Leros =

Ancient Greek historian

Pherecydes of Leros (Ancient Greek: Φερεκύδης) was, according to the Suda, an ancient Greek historian from the island of Leros. He is said to have lived "before the seventy-fifth Olympiad" (480–477 BC) and authored three works: On Leros (Περὶ Λέρου), On Iphigenia (Περὶ Ἰφιγενείας), and On the Festivals of Dionysus (Περὶ τῶν Διονύσου ἑορτῶν).

Although the Suda treats him as a distinct individual, some scholars believe he may be the same person as Pherecydes of Athens.
