= Biographia Britannica =

Biographia Britannica was a multi-volume biographical compendium, "the most ambitious attempt in the latter half of the eighteenth century to document the lives of notable British men and women". The first edition, edited by William Oldys (1696–1761) until his death, appeared in 6 volumes (the sixth in two parts, the second sometimes catalogued as volume 7) between 1747 and 1766. The editor of the two parts of volume 6 (1763 & 1766) is unknown. Five volumes of an incomplete second edition, edited by Andrew Kippis (1725–1795) with the assistance of Joseph Towers (1737–1799), appeared between 1778 and 1793, and cover names commencing Aa through to Fa; a sixth volume was prepared for publication, and may have been published, but now seems to be lost.

Contributors included Thomas Broughton and John Campbell, compiler of Lives of the Admirals (1742).
