= Oichalia =

Oichalia may refer to several places in Greece:

- Oechalia (disambiguation), one of several ancient cities in Greece
- Oichalia, Messenia, a municipality in Messenia
- Oichalia, Trikala, a municipality in the Trikala regional unit
