= Cercopes =

In Greek mythology, a pair of mischievous forest creatures

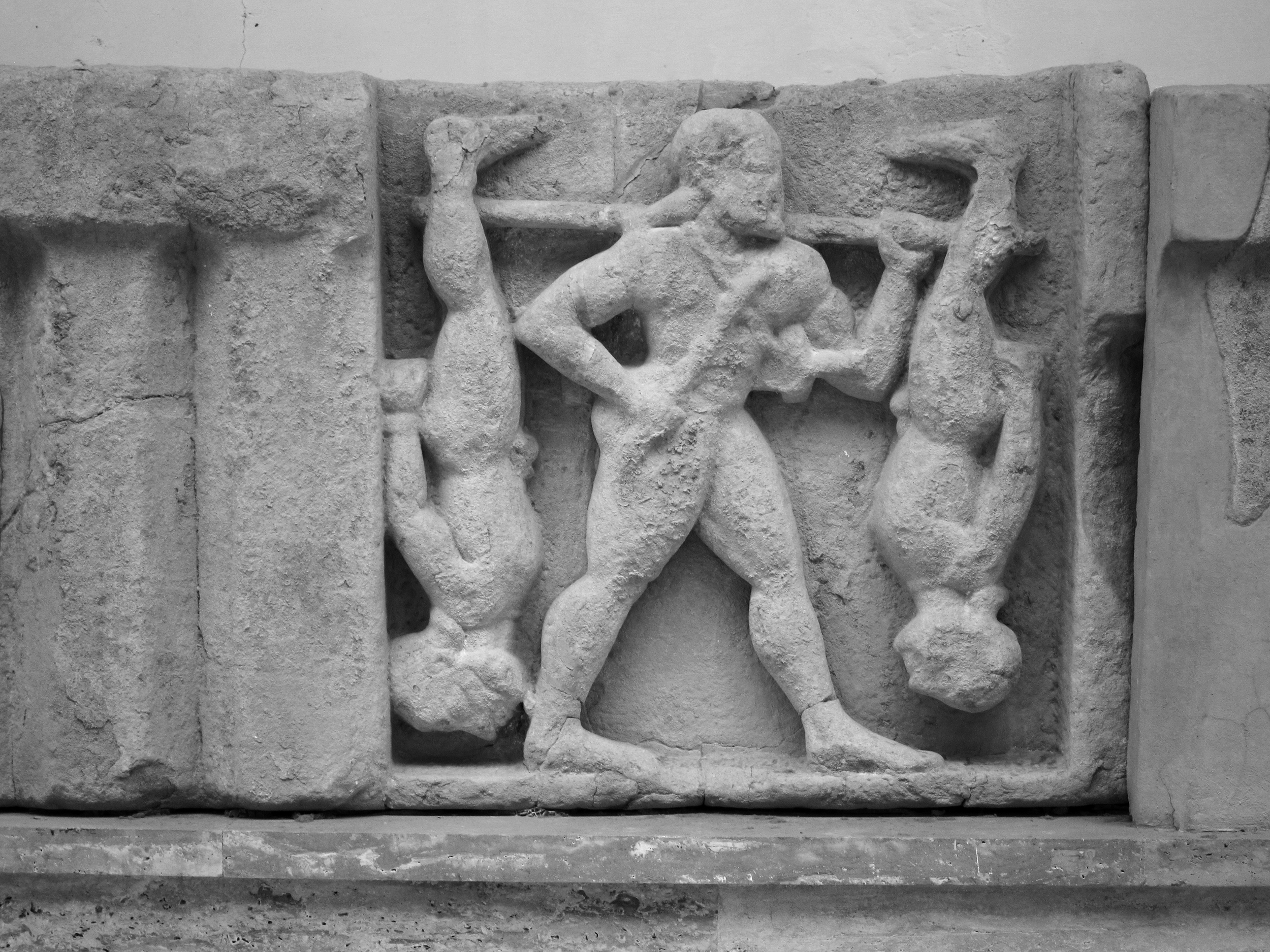
Heracles and the Cercopes (Metope in Paestum)

In Greek mythology, the Cercopes /sərˈkoʊˌpiːz/ (Greek: Κέρκωπες, plural of Κέρκωψ, from κέρκος (n.) kerkos "tail") were mischievous forest creatures who lived in Thermopylae or on Euboea but roamed the world and might turn up anywhere mischief was afoot. They were two brothers, but their names are given variously:

- Passalus /ˈpæsələs/ (Πάσσαλος) and Acmon /ˈækmən/ (Ἄκμων) or Aclemon
- Basalas /ˈbæsələs/ (Βάσαλας) and Achemon /əˈkiːmən/ (Ἄχημων)
- Olus /ˈoʊləs/ (Ὤλος) and Eurybatus /jəˈrɪbətəs/ (Εὐρύβατος)
- Candolus /ˌkænˈdoʊləs/ (Κάνδωλος) and Atlantus /ətˈlæntəs/ (Ἄτλαντος)
- Sillus /ˈsɪləs/ (Σίλλος) and Triballus /trɪˈbæləs/ (Τρίβαλλος)

Accounts of their origins vary depending on the context, but they are usually known as sons of Theia and Oceanus, thus ancient spirits.

== Mythology ==
They were proverbial as liars, cheats, and accomplished knaves. They once stole Heracles' weapons, during the time he was the penitent servant of Omphale in Lydia. He seized and bound them at Ephesus and punished them by tying them to a shoulder pole he slung over his shoulder with their faces pointing downwards, the only way they appear on Greek vases. Their mother, Theia, begged Heracles to let her sons go. This particular myth is depicted on a metope at Temple C at Selinus. According to Pherecydes, the Cercopes were turned to stone.

== As monkeys ==
In another myth, designed to explain their name ("tail-men" in Greek), Zeus changed the Cercopes into monkeys. This story inspired modern zoologists to name the genus of monkeys depicted in Minoan frescoes as Cercopithecus.

Monkeys figure in four Minoan frescos at Akrotiri, most famously in the crocus-gathering Xeste 3 fresco, where the monkey's ritual aspect, attending an enthroned female, is interpreted by Nanno Marinatos as servants of the divinity, acting as intermediary between humanity and the divine world. Green monkeys appear in Crete itself in the "House of the Frescoes" at Knossos, Monkeys are absent from Greek art. In Minoan art, it is assumed that they were exotic pets: "... the monkeys, which were imported to Crete, were pets that would have been placed where they could be seen and used by their owners, rather than simply abandoned in the countryside," concluded Shaw (1993). When Greek mythographers attempted to account for the name Pithecusae (“Ape Islands”) given to Ischia and Procida by the Bay of Naples, where no monkeys had been seen within human memory, they were reduced to alleging that they must have been deceitful men whom Zeus punished by turning them into apes. When scholars attempted to account for this exotic image they have been forced to search farther afield:

The story of Herakles and the Cercopes has been interpreted as a reminiscence of Phoenician traders bringing apes to Greek markets. See O. Keller, Thiere des classischen Alterthums (Innsbruck, 1887), p. 1. The interpretation may perhaps be supported by an Assyrian bas-relief which represents a Herculean male figure carrying an ape on his head and leading another ape by a leash, the animals being apparently brought as tribute to a king. See O. Keller, op. cit., p. 11, fig. 2.

Cline identified the monkey species in 1991 as guenons, or blue monkeys, which have bluish fur over their green skins. Scholars generally assume that the appearance of the blue monkey in Aegean iconography was due to the import of the actual animal from north Africa; they were iconic religious animals in Egypt.

== See also ==
Further references to the Cercopes can be found by the following classical authors:

- Diodorus Siculus. Bibliotheca Historia. 4.31.7.
- Nonnus. Westermann, A. (ed.). Mythographi Graeci. Appendix Narrationum, 39, p. 375.
- Tzetzes, Johannes. Chiliades. ii.431, vv. 73 ff.
- Zenobius. Cent. v. 10, Ovídio, Metamorphosis. book XIV, vv. 75–100.
