= Eurybatus (mythology) =

In Greek mythology, Eurybatus (/jəˈrɪbətəs/; Ancient Greek: Εὐρύβατος) may refer to the following characters:

- Eurybatus, one of the Argonauts
- Eurybatus, one of the Cercopes, a pair of chthonic tricksters who disturbed Heracles while he served Omphale, queen of Lydia
- Eurybatus or Eurybarus, a mythological warrior.
