= Carnasium =

Coordinates: 37°15′59″N 21°56′56″E

Carnasium or Karnasion (Ancient Greek: Καρνάσιον) was a town of ancient Messenia, 8 stadia distant from Andania, and upon the river Charadrus. Pausanias identified it with Oechalia. In his time (2nd century), Carnasium was the name given to a grove of cypresses, in which were statues of Apollo Carneius, of Hermes Criophorus, and of Persephone. It was here that the mystic rites of the great goddesses were celebrated, and that the urn was preserved containing the bones of Eurytus, the son of Melaneus.

Its site is located near the modern Polichni.
