= Ophion (god) =

Serpent Titan in Greek mythology

In some versions of Greek mythology, Ophion (/oʊˈfaɪən/; Ancient Greek: Ὀφίων "serpent"; gen.: Ὀφίωνος), also called Ophioneus (Ὀφιονεύς) ruled the world with Eurynome before the two of them were cast down by Cronus and Rhea.

== Mythology ==
Pherecydes of Syros's Heptamychia is the first attested mention of Ophion. In it, at the time of creation, the primordial figure Zas ("Life") does battle with Ophion and defeats him, casting him down into Oceanus, the primordial sea. This parallels the Chaoskampf motif found in other mythical traditions, such as the battle between Marduk and Tiamat in the Enūma Eliš, or between Baal and Yam/Lotan in the Baal Cycle.

The story was apparently popular in Orphic poetry, of which only fragments survive.

Apollonius of Rhodes in his Argonautica (1.495f) summarizes a song of Orpheus:

He sang how the earth, the heaven and the sea, once mingled together in one form, after deadly strife were separated each from the other; and how the stars and the moon and the paths of the sun ever keep their fixed place in the sky; and how the mountains rose, and how the resounding rivers with their nymphs came into being and all creeping things. And he sang how first of all Ophion and Eurynome, daughter of Oceanus, held the sway of snowy Olympus, and how through strength of arm one yielded his prerogative to Cronos and the other to Rhea, and how they fell into the waves of Oceanus; but the other two meanwhile ruled over the blessed Titan-gods, while Zeus, still a child and with the thoughts of a child, dwelt in the Dictaean cave; and the earthborn Cyclopes had not yet armed him with the bolt, with thunder and lightning; for these things give renown to Zeus.

Lycophron (1191) relates that Zeus' mother, Rhea, is skilled in wrestling, having cast the former queen Eurynome into Tartarus. A scholium on Lycophron describes Ophion as a Titan.

Nonnus in his Dionysiaca has Hera say (8.158f):

I will go to the uttermost bounds of Oceanus and share the hearth of primeval Tethys; thence I will pass to the house of Harmonia and abide with Ophion.

Harmonia here is probably an error in the text for Eurynome. Ophion is mentioned again by Nonnus (12.43):

Beside the oracular wall she saw the first tablet, old as the infinite past, containing all the things in one: upon it was all that Ophion lord paramount had done, all that ancient Cronus accomplished.

We also have fragments of the writings of the early philosopher Pherecydes of Syros (6th century B.C.E.), who devised a myth or legend in which powers known as Zas and Chronos ("Time") and Chthonie ("Of the Earth") existed from the beginning and in which Chronos creates the universe. Some fragments of this work mention a birth of Ophioneus and a battle of the gods between Cronus (not Chronos) on one side and Ophioneus and his children on the other in which an agreement is made that whoever pushes the other side into Ogenos will lose, and the winner will hold heaven.

Eusebius of Caesarea in his Praeparatio Evangelica (1.10) cites Philo of Byblos as declaring that Pherecydes took Ophion and the Ophionidae from the Phoenicians.

== See also ==
- Ophites
