= Ophion (star cluster) =

Star cluster in constellation Ophiuchus

Observation data
- Distance: 650 ly

Physical characteristics

Associations
- Constellation: Ophiuchus

Ophion is a star cluster in the constellation Ophiuchus. The cluster consists of over 1,000 stars at around 20 million years of age. Ophion is located around 650 lightyears from Earth. The cluster is separating quickly for a star cluster, in a process known as velocity dispersion. As measured by Gaia, the velocity dispersion is 72,000 kilometres per hour (45,000 mph). The pace of diversion was likely aided by a supernova along with galactic tides, the most common source of dispersion in star clusters.

Ophion was discovered by Dylan Huson of Western Washington University using data from Gaia DR3.
