= Creophylus of Samos =

Legendary early Greek epic poet

Creophylus (Ancient Greek: Κρεώφυλος ὁ Σάμιος, Kreophylos ho Samios) is the name of a legendary early Greek epic poet, native to Samos or Chios. He was said to have been a contemporary of Homer and author of the lost epic Capture of Oechalia. According to some sources, Homer gave the poem to Creophylus in return for hospitality; one source says that Panyassis of Halicarnassus, in turn, stole it from Creophylus. Panyassis, however, is a much later poet who worked in writing: the story is presumably a way of saying that Panyassis, in his literary epic on the life of Heracles, plagiarised the work of Creophylus.

Creophylus may represent a tradition parallel to the Homeridae. In Plutarch's Lives in the biography of Lycurgus, Lycurgus in his travels "…had the first sight of Homer's works, in the hands, we may suppose, of the posterity of Creophylus… scattered proportions, as chance conveyed them, were in the hands of individuals; but Lycurgus first made them really known." (John Dryden transl.). Another descendant of Creophylus, Hermodamas of Samos, was said to be the teacher of Pythagoras of Samos (see Iamblichus, Porphyry, Diogenes Laërtius). So we have two examples of descendants of Creophylus teaching outsiders (non-Homeridae) the Epic tradition. It seems that the restrictions on the Homeridae in regards to teaching may have not been applicable to the descendants of Creophylus, Homer's host and friend.

He is mentioned disparagingly in Book X (600b-c) of the Republic, in which the reasons for banishing some forms of poetry and 'imitative art' from his ideal city are outlined, with Plato alluding to his name meaning 'meathead'.
