= Capture of Oechalia =

Greek epic attributed to either Homer or Creophylus of Samos

The Capture of Oechalia (traditionally The Sack of Oechalia, Ancient Greek: Οἰχαλίας Ἅλωσις) is a fragmentary Greek epic that was variously attributed in Antiquity to either Homer or Creophylus of Samos; a tradition was reported that Homer gave the tale to Creophylus, in gratitude for guest-friendship (xenia), and that Creophylus wrote it down.

Oechalia (also known as the "city of Eurytus") was an ancient Greek city whose capture by Heracles was said to be the main subject of the epic. It is debated, based on a scholium from a line in Euripides' Medea whether Medea's poisoning of Creon may have been another feature, which Franz Stoessl suggested will have been a comparative aside in the telling of Deianira, in her original guise as the "man-destroyer" of her etymology: "the innocent Deianeira, whose murder of Heracles is tragically inadvertent, will be a later invention," Malcolm Davies asserts, "perhaps the brain-child of Sophocles."

The ancient Greek geographer Strabo noted in his Geographica that the true location of the city was unknown even to him, saying that various sources referred to Oechalia by many different names and placed it in various locations around Greece. Further complicating the factual details behind the epic is the fact that there seemed to have been several different cities called Oechalia, only one of which was discussed in it. In his play The Women of Trachis, Sophocles however seems to locate the city of Oechalia on the island of Euboea, making reference to the fact that Heracles, who had sacked the city all for the love of Eurytus's beautiful daughter Iole, had just returned from the island after having taken her, as well as other Oechalians, captive in the opening scenes of the play. When the wife of Heracles, Deianira, asks who this beautiful woman is who has been brought to her home, Lichas responds by telling her that "she's a Euboean".
