= Apollodorus of Athens =

2nd century BCE Greek grammarian and historian

Apollodorus of Athens (Ancient Greek: Ἀπολλόδωρος ὁ Ἀθηναῖος, Apollodoros ho Athenaios; c. 180 BC – after 120 BC), son of Asclepiades, was a Greek scholar, historian, and grammarian, born in Athens. He was a pupil of Diogenes of Babylon, Panaetius the Stoic, and the grammarian Aristarchus of Samothrace, under whom he appears to have studied together with his contemporary Dionysius Thrax. He left (perhaps fled) Alexandria around 146 BC, most likely for Pergamon, and eventually settled in Athens.

== Literary works ==
- Chronicle (Χρονικά, Chronika), a Greek history in verse from the fall of Troy in the 12th century BC to roughly 143 BC (although later it was extended as far as 109 BC), and based on previous works by Eratosthenes of Cyrene. Its dates are reckoned by its references to the archons of Athens. As most archons only held office for one year, scholars have been able to pin down the years to which Apollodorus was referring. The poem is written in comic trimeters and is dedicated to the second-century BC king of Pergamon, Attalus II Philadelphus.
- On the Gods (Περὶ θεῶν, Peri theon, prose, in 24 books), lost but known through quotes to have included etymologies of the names and epithets of the gods, rifled and quoted by the Roman Epicurean Philodemus; further fragments appear in the Oxyrhynchus Papyri.
- A twelve-book essay about Homer's Catalogue of Ships, also based on Eratosthenes of Cyrene and Demetrius of Scepsis, dealing with Homeric geography and how it has changed along the centuries. Strabo relied greatly on this for books 8 through 10 of his own Geographica.
- Other possible works include an early etymology (possibly the earliest by an Alexandrian writer), and analyses of the poets Epicharmus of Kos and Sophron.
- Apollodorus produced numerous other critical and grammatical writings, which have not survived.
- His eminence as a scholar gave rise to several imitations, forgeries and misattributions. The Bibliotheca (or Library), an encyclopedia of Greek mythology, was traditionally attributed to him; it was not written by him, however, as it cites Castor the Annalist, a contemporary of Cicero, providing a terminus post quem after the time of Apollodorus. As a result, the author of the Bibliotheca is often referred to as "Pseudo-Apollodorus".
