= Pherecydes of Athens =

Ancient Greek historian and genealogist

Pherecydes of Athens (Ancient Greek: Φερεκύδης) (fl. c. 465 BC) was a Greek mythographer who wrote an ancient work in ten books, now lost, variously titled "Historiai" (Ἱστορίαι) or "Genealogiai" (Γενελογίαι). He is one of the authors (= FGrHist 3) whose fragments were collected in Felix Jacoby's Die Fragmente der griechischen Historiker.

He is generally thought to be different from the sixth-century Pre-Socratic philosopher Pherecydes of Syros, who was sometimes mentioned as one of the Seven Sages of Greece and was reputed to have been the teacher of Pythagoras. Although the Suda considers them separately, he is possibly the same person as Pherecydes of Leros.
