= Oechalia (Arcadia) =

Oechalia or Oichalia (Ancient Greek: Οἰχαλία) was a town of ancient Arcadia mentioned by Stephanus of Byzantium.

Its site is unlocated.
