= Women of Trachis =

Ancient Greek tragedy by Sophocles

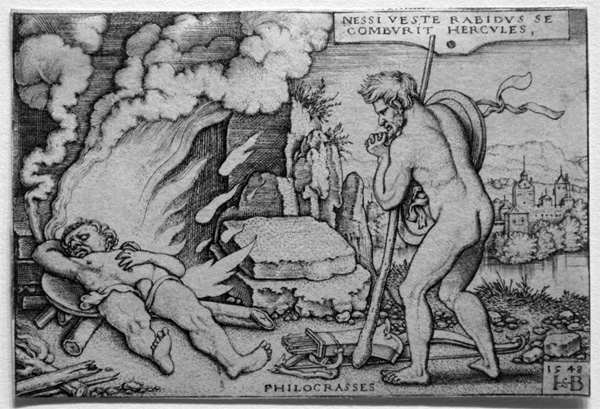
- Hercules on his funeral pyre by Hans Sebald Beham
- Original language: Ancient Greek
- Written by: Sophocles
- Chorus: Women of Trachis
- Characters: Deianeira; Nurse; Hyllus; Messenger; Lichas; Heracles; Old man
- Mute: Iole
- Genre: Athenian tragedy
- Setting: At Trachis, before the house of Heracles

Premiere
- Place: Athens

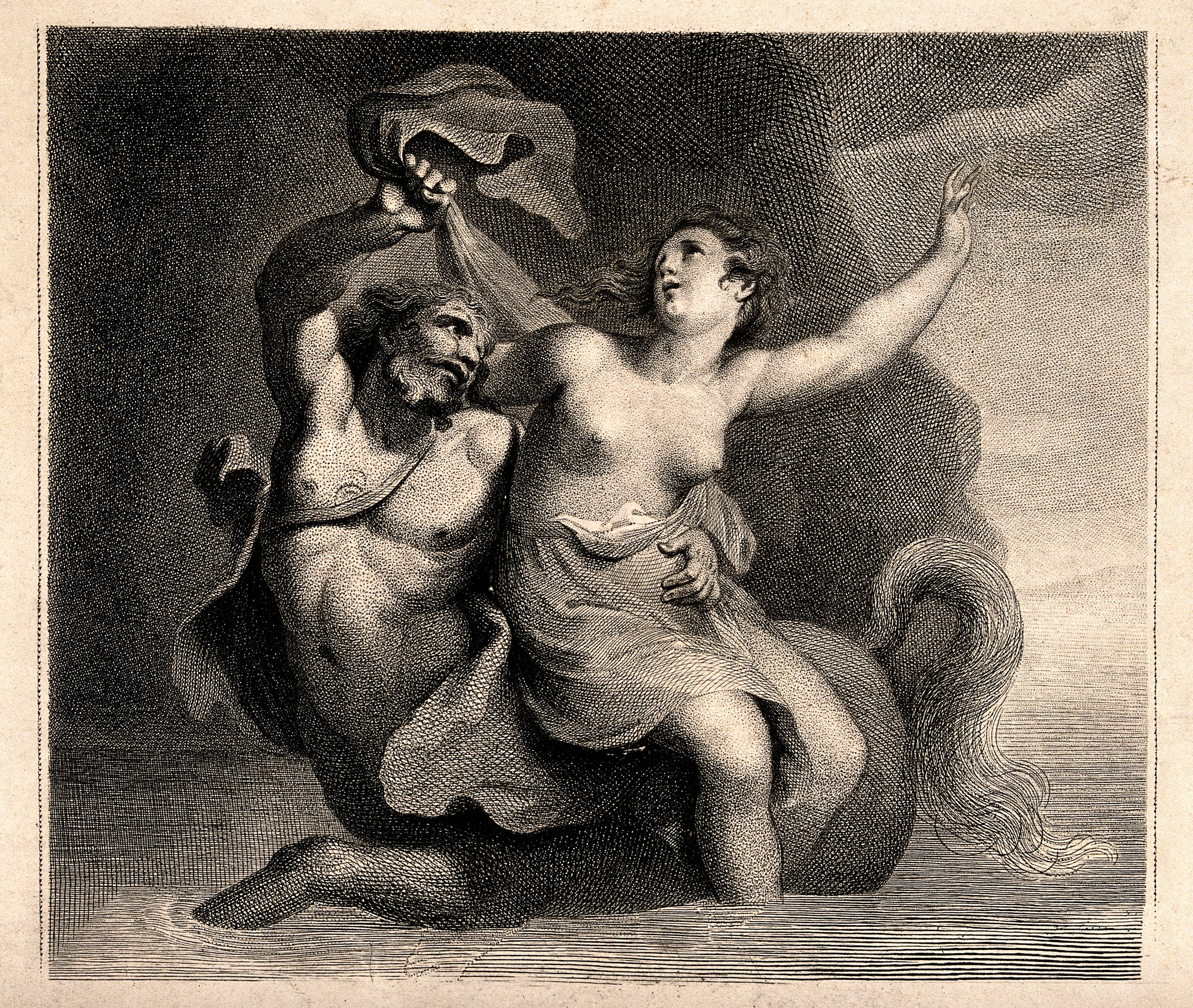
Artistic rendition of Deianeira being captured by the centaur, Nessus.

Women of Trachis or The Trachiniae (Ancient Greek: Τραχίνιαι, Trachiniai) c. 450–425 BC, is an Athenian tragedy by Sophocles.

Women of Trachis is generally considered to be less developed than Sophocles' other works, and its dating has been a subject of disagreement among critics and scholars.

== Synopsis ==
The story begins with Deianeira, the wife of Heracles, relating the story of her early life and her great difficulties in adjusting to her years of married life. Heracles was not her first suitor; the river god Achelous was first to woo her, but, with Zeus's intervention, Heracles defeated Achelous and took her as a wife. Now she is distraught over her husband's neglect of their family. Often off somewhere involved in some adventure, he rarely sees her or their children. It has been fifteen months since she last heard from him, so she does not know his whereabouts. She sends their son Hyllus to find him, for she is concerned about prophecies foretelling that Heracles will die if he stays where he is. After Hyllus sets off, a messenger arrives with word that Heracles, victorious in recent battle, is making offerings on Cape Cenaeum before coming home soon to Trachis. The messenger adds that Heracles's homecoming has been delayed by the popular demand wherever he goes to hear tales of his victories.

Lichas, a herald of Heracles, arrives with a procession of captives. He lies to Deianeira about why Heracles had laid siege to the city of Oechalia (in Euboea). He claims Eurytus, the city's king, had ordered Heracles enslaved, causing Heracles to vow revenge against him and his people. As part of his revenge, Heracles enslaved the women of Eurytus and ordered Lichas to take them to Trachis. Among the captured is Iole, daughter of Eurytus. Deianeira soon learns from another messenger the truth: Heracles laid siege to the city just to obtain Iole after the king refused to allow Heracles to take Iole as a secret lover. Extremely disappointed and upset, Deianeira uses the information to question Lichas more pointedly, and he soon confirms the truth of the messenger's story.

Unable to cope with her husband falling for a young woman, she decides to use a love charm on him, a magic potion that will win him back. When she was younger, she had been carried across the River Evenus by the centaur Nessus. Halfway through the crossing, he tried to sexually assault her, but Heracles heard her cries and came to her rescue, quickly shooting Nessus with an arrow. As he was dying, he told her his blood, now mixed with the poison of the Lernaean Hydra in which Heracles' arrow had been dipped, would keep Heracles from loving any other woman more than her as long as she followed his hastily given directions. So now, years later, Deianeira dyes a robe with the blood and has Lichas carry it to Heracles with strict instructions that no one else must wear it and it must be kept in darkness until he puts it on.

After Deianeira sends her gift securely off, a bad feeling comes over her. She throws some of the leftover material into sunlight and it reacts like boiling acid. Shocked, she realizes Nessus had lied about the love charm: it was a poison that would bring death to his killer. Hyllus returns and tells his mother that his father, poisoned by the robe, lies dying. In Heracles's horrific pain and fury, he brutally killed Lichas for having brought him the robe: "he made the white brain to ooze from the hair, as the skull was dashed to splinters, and blood scattered therewith" (as translated by Sir Richard C. Jebb).

Deianeira feels enormous shame for what she has done, amplified by her son's harsh words, and kills herself. Hyllus discovers soon after that his mother did not intend to kill her husband. The dying Heracles is carried to his home in agony and furious over what he believes was his wife's murder attempt. Hyllus explains the truth, and Heracles realizes that the prophecies he heard about his death have come true: he was to be killed by someone already dead, and it turned out to be Nessus.

Heracles's pain becomes so unbearable he begs and begs for someone to finish him off, bemoaning that his weakened state makes him like a woman. He makes Hyllus promise him two things under protest: first, while shedding no tears, to take Heracles to the highest point of Zeus's peak and burn him alive on a pillar, and second, to marry Iole. Heracles is then carried offstage to the unseen mountain, where he will be killed as requested.

== Date ==
The date of the first performance of Women of Trachis is unknown, and scholars have speculated a wide range of dates for its initial performance. Scholars such as T.F. Hoey believe the play was written relatively early in Sophocles' career, around 450 BC. Often cited as evidence for an early date is the fact that the dramatic form of Women of Trachis is not as developed as those of Sophocles' other surviving works, advancing the belief that the play comes from a younger and less skilled Sophocles. Additionally, the plot of the play is similar to a story related by Bacchylides in Bacchylides XVI, but in some respects significantly different from earlier known versions of Bacchylides' story. From this, Hoey and others have argued that Sophocles' interpretation was more likely to have influenced Bacchylides than vice versa. Serving as further evidence is the relationship between the character of Deianeira and that of Clytemnestra in Aeschylus' Oresteia, first produced in 458. In earlier known versions of this story, Deianeira has several masculine qualities, similar to those of Clytemnestra – who, in the Oresteia, purposely kills her husband Agamemnon. In Women of Trachis, however, Deianeira's character is softer and more feminine, and she is only inadvertently responsible for her husband's death. According to some scholars, Deianeira's character in Women of Trachis is intended as a commentary on Aeschylus' treatment of Clytemnestra; if so, Women of Trachis was probably produced reasonably soon after the Oresteia, although it is also possible that such commentary was triggered by a later revival of Aeschylus' trilogy. Hoey also sees echoes of Aeschylus' Prometheus Bound, particularly in the relevance of Women of Trachis to debates that were occurring during the 450s on the "relationship between knowledge and responsibility."

Other scholars, such as Cedric H. Whitman, argue for a production date during the 430s, close to but probably before Oedipus Rex. Evidence for a date near Oedipus Rex include a thematic similarity between the two plays. Whitman believes the two plays represent "another large step in the metaphysics of evil, to which Sophocles devoted his life." Thomas B. L. Webster also estimates a date in the 430s, close to 431, for a variety of reasons. One reason Webster gives for this dating is that there are a number of similarities between Women of Trachis and plays by Euripides that were known to be written between 438 and 417, and so may help narrow the range of dates, although it is unknown which poet borrowed from the other. A stronger reason Webster gives for this dating is that he believes that the structure of Woman of Trachis is similar to that of Sophocles' lost play Tereus, which Webster dates to this time period based largely on circumstantial evidence from Thucydides. Finally, Webster believes that the language and structure of Women of Trachis are consistent with such a date.

Other scholars, including Michael Vickers, argue for a date around 424 or 425, later than the generally accepted date range for the first performance of Oedipus Rex. Arguments in favor of such a date include the fact that events of the play seem to reflect events that occurred during the Peloponnesian War around that time. The Spartans believed they were descended from Heracles, and in 427 or 426, Sparta founded a colony in Trachis called Heraclea. The colony alarmed Athens, who feared the colony could be used to attack Euboea, and in Women of Trachis Heracles is said to be either waging war or planning to do so against Euboea. Vickers believes that the link to current events and to Sparta accounts for why Heracles is portrayed so coldly in the play. Vickers also argues that Sophocles chose the name "Lichas" for Heracles' messenger as a result of the link to current events, as Lichas was the name of a prominent Spartiate envoy during the war.

== Translations ==
- 1849 – Theodore Alois Buckley
- 1878 – Edward Hayes Plumptre: verse (full text available at Wikisource)
- 1883 – Lewis Campbell: verse (full text available at Wikisource)
- 1892 – Richard C. Jebb: prose (full text available at Wikisource)
- 1912 – Francis Storr: verse: full text
- 1938 – Esther S. Barlow: verse
- 1956 – Ezra Pound: verse
- 1957 – Michael Jameson: verse
- 1966 – Robert Torrance: verse (Full Text)
- 1990 – J. Michael Walton: verse
- 1994 – Hugh Lloyd-Jones: prose
- 2001 – Paul Roche: verse
- 2007 – George Theodoridis: prose: full text
- 2015 – Bryan Doerries: prose
- 2018 – Ian C. Johnston: verse: full text
- 2021 - Rachel Kitzinger and Eamon Grennan: verse: full text

== Commentaries ==
- Gilbert Austin Davies, 1908 (abridged from the larger edition of Richard Claverhouse Jebb)
- Easterling, Patricia E. (1982) Trachiniae. Cambridge Greek and Latin Classics. Cambridge University Press.
