= Demetrius of Scepsis =

Ancient Greek grammarian

Demetrius of Scepsis (Ancient Greek: Δημήτριος ὁ Σκήψιος) was a Greek grammarian of the time of Aristarchus and Crates (Strab. xiii. p. 609), the first half of the second century BC. He is sometimes simply called the Scepsian (Strab. ix. pp. 438, 439, x. pp. 456, 472, 473, 489), and sometimes simply Demetrius (Strab. xii. pp. 551, 552, xiii. pp. 596, 600, 602).

Diogenes Laërtius mentions him as one in a list of well-known namesakes.

He was the author of a very extensive work which is very often referred to, and bore the title Τρωικὸς διάκοσμος. It consisted of at least twenty-six books (Strab. xiii. p. 603 and passim; Athen. iii. pp. 80, 91; Steph. Byz. s.v. Σιλίνδιον). This work was an historical and geographical commentary on that part of the second book of the Iliad in which the forces of the Trojans are enumerated, known as the Trojan Battle Order or Trojan Catalogue (compare Harpocrat. s. vv. Ἀδράστειον, Θυργωνίδαι; Schol. ad Apollon. Rhod. i. 1123, 1165). The numerous other passages in which Demetrius of Scepsis is mentioned or quoted, are collected by Westermann on Vossius, De Hist. Graec., p. 179, &c.

Demetrius's work has been used by several ancient authors as important source for the Troad region. Among these authors is Strabo in Book 13 of his Geographica. Some of the fragments are also quoted by Athenaeus in his Deipnosophistae.
