= National Open Source-Intelligence Agency =

Proposed US government agency

- Seal of the US Intelligence Community

Agency overview
- Formed: Proposed
- Jurisdiction: United States Federal Government
- Parent department: Department of Defense

The National Open Source-Intelligence Agency (NOSA) is a proposed 19th member of the United States Intelligence Community (IC) to be tasked with the collection and exploitation of open-source intelligence (OSINT). Creation of the agency would consolidate open source efforts from across the US government into a new functional manager for the open-source intelligence discipline, drawing resources from the Open Source Enterprise of the Central Intelligence Agency, the Open Source Integration Center (OSIC) of the Defense Intelligence Agency, the National Geospatial-Intelligence Agency, as well as other open source focused entities across the government.

== History ==
=== Foreign Broadcast Information Service ===
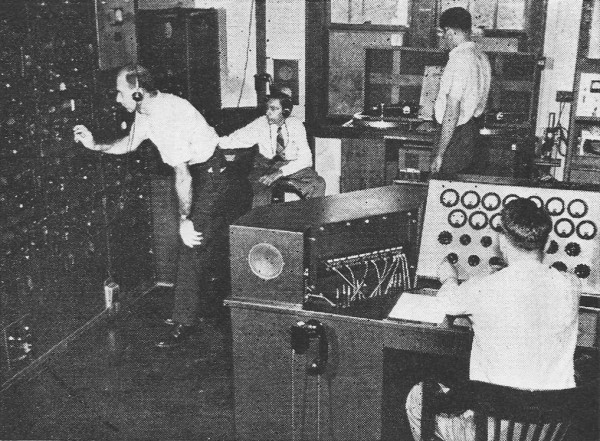
Members of the Foreign Broadcast Information Service listen to foreign radio intercepts in January 1945

The beginnings of open-source intelligence in the U.S. government originated with the Foreign Broadcast Information Service (FBIS), established in 1941 at the direction of President Franklin D. Roosevelt to collect intelligence on Axis radio propaganda directed at the United States. During WWII it was renamed the Foreign Broadcast Intelligence Service, and focused on aid to the war effort. Amid the wide ranging reorganization of American defense and intelligence infrastructure following the war, in 1946, the service was renamed the Foreign Broadcast Information Service (FBIS), and became a part of the Central Intelligence Agency (CIA) once the agency was formed from the National Security Act of 1947. The service's mission at CIA revolved around radio and press agency monitoring, built on what was already becoming an “almost mature, trained and disciplined” organization from the war experience. In 1967, the service's mission was expanded to cover foreign mass media transmitted by radio, television, and print. In the 1990's, the mission was expanded again to include information made available on the internet.

=== Internet age ===
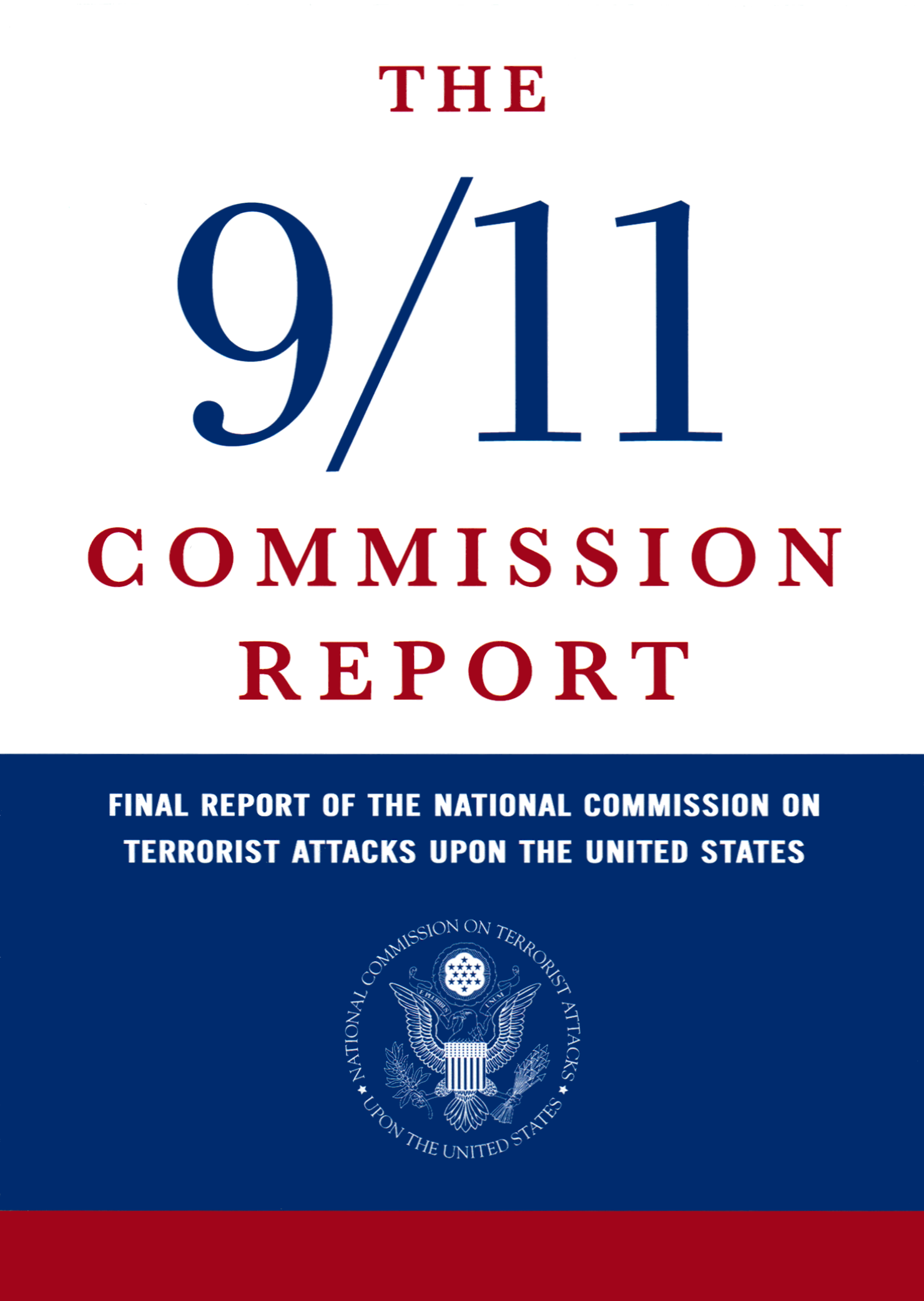
The 9/11 Commission recommended an independent intelligence agency for open source

In 1996, the Aspin–Brown Commission, created after Congress failed to pass the National Security Act of 1992, recommended an overhaul of the Intelligence Community's approach to OSINT, finding that "Intelligence lags behind in terms of assimilating open source information into the analytical process", and that efforts of the IC "to structure and make available to analysts pertinent open source data bases seems inexplicably slow." In 2000, Senator David Boren of Oklahoma, a member of the commission, original sponsor of the 1992 National Security Act, and chair of the Senate Select Committee on Intelligence wrote in a foreword to former CIA officer and advocate for an independent OSINT agency Robert Steele's book On Intelligence: Spies and Secrecy in an Open World, that few if any of the commissions recommendations had been implemented by the subsequent Directors of Central Intelligence who had the opportunity.

Congressman Rob Simmons of Connecticut introduced legislation for an independent agency in 2004, differed from Eliot Jardines, the first Assistant Deputy Director of National Intelligence for Open Source. While Simmons and Steele advocated an open, expansive and inclusive vision of open-source intelligence, "Jardines sought to institutionalize the collection and analysis of open source within the U.S. intelligence community in ways that did not overtly challenge the dominant institutional logic of secrecy." Around 2005, Jardines' view prevailed, and Simmons' legislation floundered, quashing plans for an independent agency for years to come.

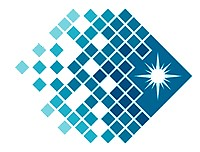
Logo of the Open Source Center circa 2010, featuring the distinctive star of the Central Intelligence Agency

Around the same time in 2005, the WMD Commission, tasked in part with evaluating readiness of US intelligence to respond to threats raised by the use of weapons of mass destruction in the wake of intelligence failures prior to the September 11 attacks and the 2003 invasion of Iraq, suggested the creation of an open source directorate within the CIA. By November 2005, CIA had announced FBIS would be combined into the new ODNI Open Source Center, tasked to collect and analyze open source information of intelligence value across print, broadcast, and online media.

In 2006, following recommendations in the 9/11 Commission Report which identified a need for greater use of open source information, and recommended the creation of an independent open source agency, Director of National Intelligence John Negroponte issued Intelligence Community Directive 301 on the National Open Source Enterprise, requiring the intelligence community to make open source intelligence the source of first resort. The directive was rescinded in 2012, restoring primary control of open source efforts to CIA by default via existing guidance in ICD 113 designating CIA the functional manager for OSINT.

At the end of 2013, CIA abruptly terminated the publicly available translation products and open source analysis which had operated since 1974, citing costs and the easy availability of alternate public sources. The long running program had been inherited from FBIS, and its sudden demise marked a significant curtailing of investment in government open source capabilities.

In October 2015 the ODNI Open Source Center was redesignated the Open Source Enterprise and moved to the CIA (original home of FBIS), and incorporated into a new Directorate of Digital Innovation created as part of a significant reorganization of the agency by CIA director John Brennan. While some believed the inclusion of the OSE in a directorate focused on cyber threats and digital technology could enhance the institution’s embrace of technology and analytic tools, some worried it would also hamper the outward orientation of the organization’s collection and analysis mission in support of the entire IC.

== Independent agency proposals ==
The creation of a dedicated intelligence organization for the collection and exploitation of Open-source intelligence first appeared in US law in section 1052 of the 2004 Intelligence Reform and Terrorism Prevention Act (IRTPA) which directed the newly created Director of National Intelligence to establish an "open source center" following the recommendations of the 9/11 Commission.

Within government, OSINT as a discrete topic, worthy of individual attention, seemed to reach its height of popularity in 2008, however interest reemerged as OSINT research by private citizens, news outlets, NGOs, and independent investigative outlets like Bellingcat and Oryx have proliferated online, and revelations about the role of OSINT in the 2022 Russian invasion of Ukraine, as well as the massive prioritization of OSINT by Chinese intelligence services in recent years has come to light.

=== Legislative history ===
In 2004, Congressman Rob Simmons of Connecticut introduced the Smart Nation Act to establish an independent open source intelligence agency. The act would have also established a primary national open source information collection and sharing capability outside the Intelligence Community, as a sister agency to the Broadcasting Board of Governors (now the U.S. Agency for Global Media). Simmons, a retired Colonel in the U.S. Army, previously commanded the 434th Military Intelligence Detachment (Strategic), a New Haven, Connecticut-based reserve unit associated with Yale University which wrote the first handbook for open source intelligence for the Army in 1994.

In the fiscal year (FY) 2021 appropriations act, Congress passed Public Law 116-260 S.623 "Independent Study on Open Source Intelligence", mandating the Director of National Intelligence, in consultation with House and Senate intelligence committees, contract a federally funded research and development corporation (FFRDC) or non-governmental entity to study the future of collection, processing, exploitation, analysis, dissemination, and evaluation of OSINT in the IC. Subsection (B)(1)(F) mandated the study identify "whether to establish a new agency as an element of the intelligence community dedicated to open-source intelligence." The report was due to Congress on or before September 23, 2021.

=== Support ===
- The Center for Strategic and International Studies (CSIS) Technology and Intelligence Task Force, chaired by current Director of National Intelligence Avril Haines, listed the creation of an independent open source agency as the first among a slate of three options it supported to reform ongoing deficiencies in the Open Source Enterprise.
- In 2023, Michael Morell, former acting Director of the CIA, has repeatedly spoken of his support for an independent agency for open source, and the use of OSINT as the "int of first resort."
- Amy Zegart, senior fellow at the Hoover Institution, wrote in Foreign Affairs that "secret agencies will always favor secrets. For intelligence to succeed in this era, open-source intelligence has to be foundational. And for it to be foundational, it has to have a dedicated organization focused relentlessly and single-mindedly on that mission.
- Former CIA officers Peter Mattis and Rodney Faraon wrote in The Hill, that "multiple small efforts is insufficient... to harness the current open source revolutionary potential." "The answer, we believe, rests on standing up a standalone open source entity."
- Chris Rasmussen, a long-time OSINT practitioner within the IC writing in his personal capacity as a concerned US citizen, argues for an OSINT Agency but one outside the Intelligence Community governed by an independent board. He argues that OSINT done "at scale" cannot co-exist bound within organizations designed to protect secrets. He says:
  The new entity must be built from the ground up, not to protect secrets, but to create quality and shareable OSINT at scale with sufficient full-time OSINT practitioners in large numbers enabled by remote and hybrid telework, limited security clearances, and the rapid growth of the OSINT knowledge base at the unclassified level for broad dissemination, not sucked to the highside [classified system] as a supplement to classified operations.

=== Concerns ===
The CSIS Technology and Intelligence Task Force expressed support for the creation of an open source agency among a slate of options to reform the Open Source Enterprise, but warned that "even championed by an independent agency, OSINT may never be able to thrive inside IC culture that preferences classified data."

== See also ==
- BBC Monitoring, a provider of open source intelligence to the British intelligence services administered by the public broadcaster of the British government
- Open Source Centre, a component of the Australian Office of National Intelligence which provides open source support to the Australian Intelligence Community
