= Zegart =

Zegart is a surname. Notable people with the surname include:

- Amy Zegart (born 1967), American academic
- Arthur Zegart (1916–1989), American documentary film producer
- Shelly Zegart (1941–2025), American quilter
