= International Honor Quilt =

1980 installation artwork by feminist artist Judy Chicago

- Also known as International Quilting Bee
- A section of the International Honor Quilt
- Artist: Judy Chicago
- Year: 1980; 46 years ago
- Type: Collective feminist art project
- Medium: Quilt pieces
- Location: Louisville, Kentucky
- Owner: The Hite Art Institute, University of Louisville (since 2013)
- Website: International Honor Quilt

The International Honor Quilt (also known as the International Quilting Bee) is a feminist collective art project initiated in 1980 by Judy Chicago as a companion piece to The Dinner Party. The piece is a collection of 539 two-foot-long quilted triangles that honor women from around the world. Through the Flower, Chicago's not-for-profit organization, gifted the collection to University of Louisville Hite Art Institute in 2013 to be available for research and to exhibit.

== History ==
=== Creation ===
In Judy Chicago's autobiography, Beyond the Flower, she discusses initiating the International Quilting Bee, stating that "people would be invited to submit their triangular quilts...honoring women of their own determination. By doing this, I intended to provide an opportunity for community participation and also to counter another criticism that had emerged, this time about my choices of women."

=== Community collaboration ===
Individual quilt panels were often created by groups of women after viewing or hearing about Chicago's Dinner Party. For example, a group from the Chrysallis Center at Saginaw Valley State University, Michigan, visited the Dinner Party exhibition in Chicago in 1981. Returning to Saginaw via bus that evening, they decided they needed to create a quilt panel and submit it to the project. Under the leadership of Rosalie (Riegle) Troester, an English instructor at the University, and Trish Nowicke, Campus Minister, a group of fourteen students created a multicolored butterfly wing as a symbolic representation of both the growth stage, and the student career counseling and support center of which they were members. They completed the project and forwarded their creation to Through the Flower for display at the next Dinner Party venue in Montreal.

=== Donation ===
In 2013, Judy Chicago donated the International Honor Quilt to the University of Louisville after quilt historian and advocate Shelly Zegart suggested it as the best place for the quilt.

== Description ==
The International Honor Quilt is a collection of 539 panels of triangular quilts honoring women, women's organizations, and women's issues.

=== Women represented ===
==== Mythological, religious, fictional ====
- Deborah
- Demeter
- Eve
- Isis
- Loch Ness Monster
- Nancy Drew
- Persephone
- Virgin Mary

==== Well-known women ====
- Abigail Adams
- Agatha Christie
- Ana Lupas
- Anaïs Nin
- Anna Pavlova
- Anne Frank
- Annie Oakley
- Betty Friedan
- Billie Jean King
- Chiang Ching
- Corrie ten Boom
- Dame Cicely Saunders
- Edna St. Vincent Millay
- Eleanor Roosevelt
- Elizabeth II
- Ellen Powell Tiberino
- Emily Brontë
- Emily Carr
- Emma Lazarus
- Emmy Noether
- Eva Hesse
- Florence Nightingale
- Frida Kahlo
- Fumiko Kaneko
- Georgia O'Keeffe
- Gertrude Stein
- Hannah Szenes
- Helen Keller
- Imogen Cunningham
- Isadora Duncan
- Jane Addams
- Janis Joplin
- Joan of Arc
- Joan Baez
- Joy Adamson
- Judy Chicago
- Kathe Kollwitz
- Katie Sandwina
- Lorena Hickok
- Louise Nevelson
- Margaret Atwood
- Margaret Sanger
- Maria Montessori
- Marie Curie
- Marie Stopes
- Mary Anning
- Mary Cassatt
- Mary Daly
- Mother Teresa
- Nancy Crow
- Nellie McClung
- Nikki Giovanni
- Paula Modersohn-Becker
- Pearl Chase
- Pearl S. Buck
- The Pointer Sisters
- Rachel Carson
- Rebecca Nurse
- Ruth Asawa
- Sandra Day O'Connor
- Sojourner Truth
- Sonia Delaunay
- Sophie Scholl
- Vonda N. McIntyre
- Winnie Madikizela-Mandela

=== Women's groups and organizations ===
- American Association of University Women (A.U.W.) (several panels)
- East Bay Heritage Quilters
- League of Women Voters
- National Organization for Women (N.O.W.) (several panels)
- Shakers

=== Countries represented ===
Women from around the world wanted to be a part of the feminist spirit of The Dinner Party as it toured. Twelve countries are represented with over 136 known municipalities. The University of Louisville's Digital Archives has detailed information about locations of all the quilt pieces.

- United States – (35 known locations)
- Canada – 105
- Australia – 30 (21 known locations)
- Germany – 27
- England – 12
- India – 5
- Austria – 3
- Scotland – 3
- Romania – 2
- South Africa – 2
- Israel – 1
- Japan – 1

== Impact ==
According to Kay Grubola, (Note: Kay Grubola was the vice president of the Kentucky Quilt Project in 2014, when she gave the statement quoted in this article.) the International Honor Quilt "was a model for public statements like the AIDS Quilt — they contacted Judy to find out how she did it." Cleve Jones, founder of the NAMES Project AIDS Memorial Quilt, listed Judy Chicago's Dinner Party as one inspiration for the project.

== See also ==
- 77 Women commemoration quilt
- Feminist art movement (United States)
- Quilt art
- Quilt of Belonging
- Women's history
