= NVTC =

NVTC may refer to:

- National Virtual Translation Center, a federal government agency of the United States
- Northern Virginia Transportation Commission, United States
