= Harold Brown (secretary of defense) =

American nuclear physicist and U.S. Secretary of Defense

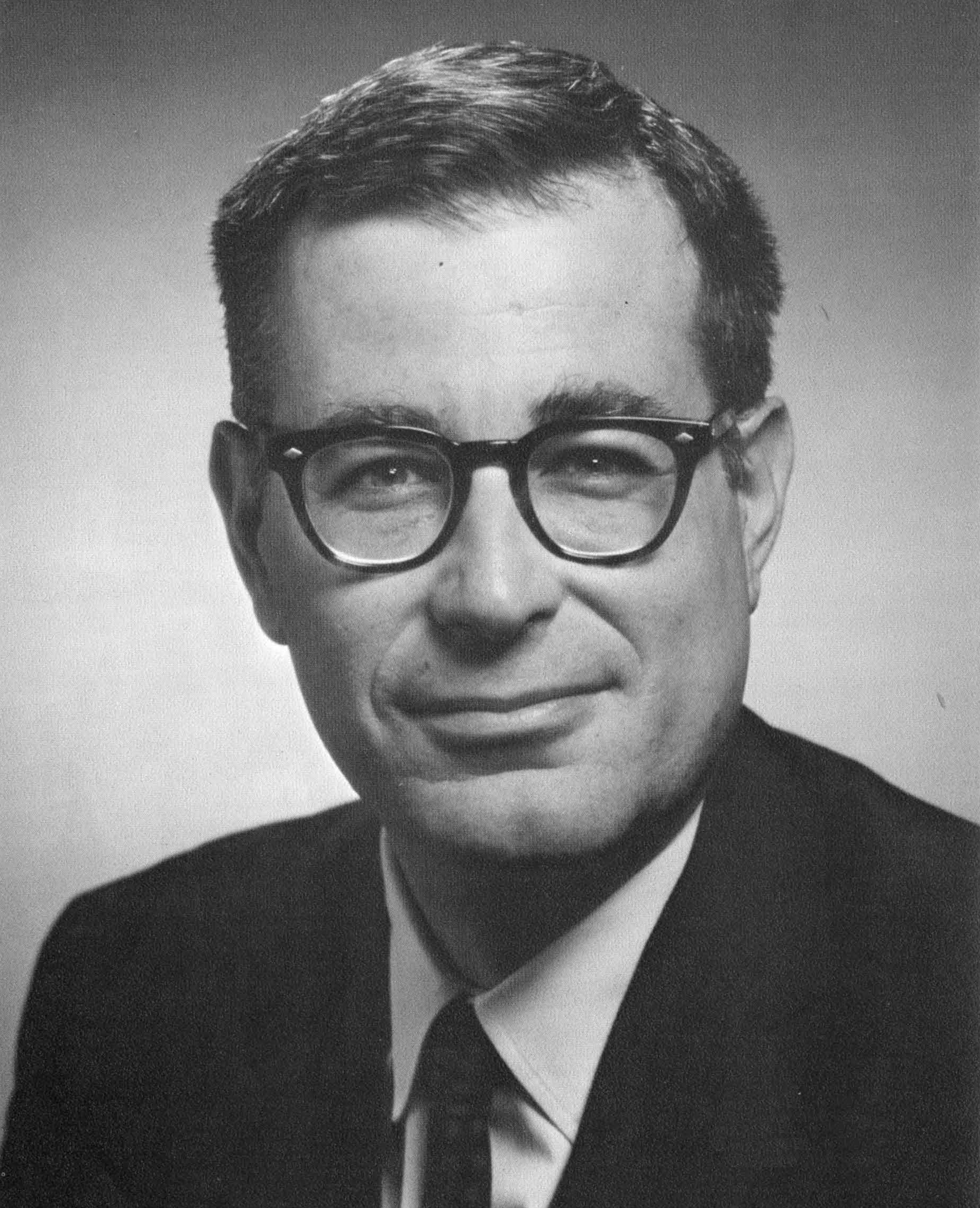
- Brown in 1970

14th United States Secretary of Defense
- In office January 20, 1977 – January 20, 1981
- President: Jimmy Carter
- Preceded by: Donald Rumsfeld
- Succeeded by: Caspar Weinberger

3rd President of the California Institute of Technology
- In office 1969–1977
- Preceded by: Lee Alvin DuBridge
- Succeeded by: Robert F. Christy (acting)

8th United States Secretary of the Air Force
- In office October 1, 1965 – February 15, 1969
- President: Lyndon B. Johnson
- Preceded by: Eugene M. Zuckert
- Succeeded by: Robert Seamans

2nd Director of Defense Research and Engineering
- In office May 8, 1961 – September 30, 1965
- President: John F. Kennedy; Lyndon B. Johnson
- Preceded by: Herbert York
- Succeeded by: John S. Foster Jr.

Personal details
- Born: September 19, 1927 New York City, U.S.
- Died: January 4, 2019 (aged 91) Rancho Santa Fe, California, U.S.
- Party: Democratic
- Spouse: Colene Dunning McDowell (m. 1953)
- Children: 2
- Education: Columbia University (BS, MS, PhD)
- Scientific career
- Fields: Nuclear physics Atomic physics
- Institutions: Lawrence Livermore National Laboratory; California Institute of Technology
- Thesis: Beta-spectra of gaseous argon-41 and oxygen-15 (1951)
- Doctoral advisor: Isidor Isaac Rabi

Harold Brown (September 19, 1927 – January 4, 2019) was an American nuclear physicist who served as United States Secretary of Defense from 1977 to 1981, under President Jimmy Carter. Previously, in the John F. Kennedy and Lyndon B. Johnson administrations, he held the posts of Director of Defense Research and Engineering (1961–1965) and United States Secretary of the Air Force (1965–1969).

A child prodigy, Brown graduated from the Bronx High School of Science at age 15, and earned a Ph.D. in physics from Columbia University at age 21. As Secretary of Defense, he set the groundwork for the Camp David Accords, took part in strategic arms negotiations with the Soviet Union, and supported, unsuccessfully, ratification of the SALT II treaty.

== Early life and career ==
Brown was born in Brooklyn, New York, the son of Abraham, a lawyer who had fought in World War I, and Gertrude (Cohen) Brown, a diamond merchant's bookkeeper. His parents were secular Jews and strong supporters of President Franklin D. Roosevelt. From a very young age Brown was drawn to mathematics and physics; he enrolled as a student at the Bronx High School of Science, from which he graduated at age 15 with a grade average of 99.5. He then immediately entered Columbia University, earning an A.B. summa cum laude at 17 years of age, as well as the Green Memorial Prize for the best academic record. He continued as a graduate student at Columbia, and was awarded a Ph.D. in physics in 1949 when he was 21.

After a short period of teaching and postdoctoral research, Brown became a research scientist at the Radiation Laboratory at the University of California, Berkeley. At Berkeley, he played a role in the construction of the Polaris missile and the development of plutonium. In 1952, he joined the staff of the University of California Radiation Laboratory at Livermore and became its director in 1960, succeeding Edward Teller, of whom he was a protégé. At Livermore, Brown led a team of six other physicists, all older than he was, who used some of the first computers, along with mathematics and engineering, to reduce the size of thermonuclear warheads for strategic military use. Brown and his team helped make Livermore's reputation by designing nuclear warheads small and light enough to be placed on the Navy's nuclear-powered ballistic missile submarines (SSBNs). During the 1950s he served as a member of, or consultant to, several federal scientific bodies and as senior science adviser at the 1958-1959 Conference on the Discontinuance of Nuclear Tests.

Brown worked under United States Secretary of Defense Robert McNamara as Director of Defense Research and Engineering from 1961 to 1965, and then as United States Secretary of the Air Force from October 1965 to February 1969, first under McNamara and then under Clark Clifford.

From 1969 to 1977, he was President of the California Institute of Technology (Caltech).

== U.S. Secretary of Defense ==
=== Appointment and initial agenda ===
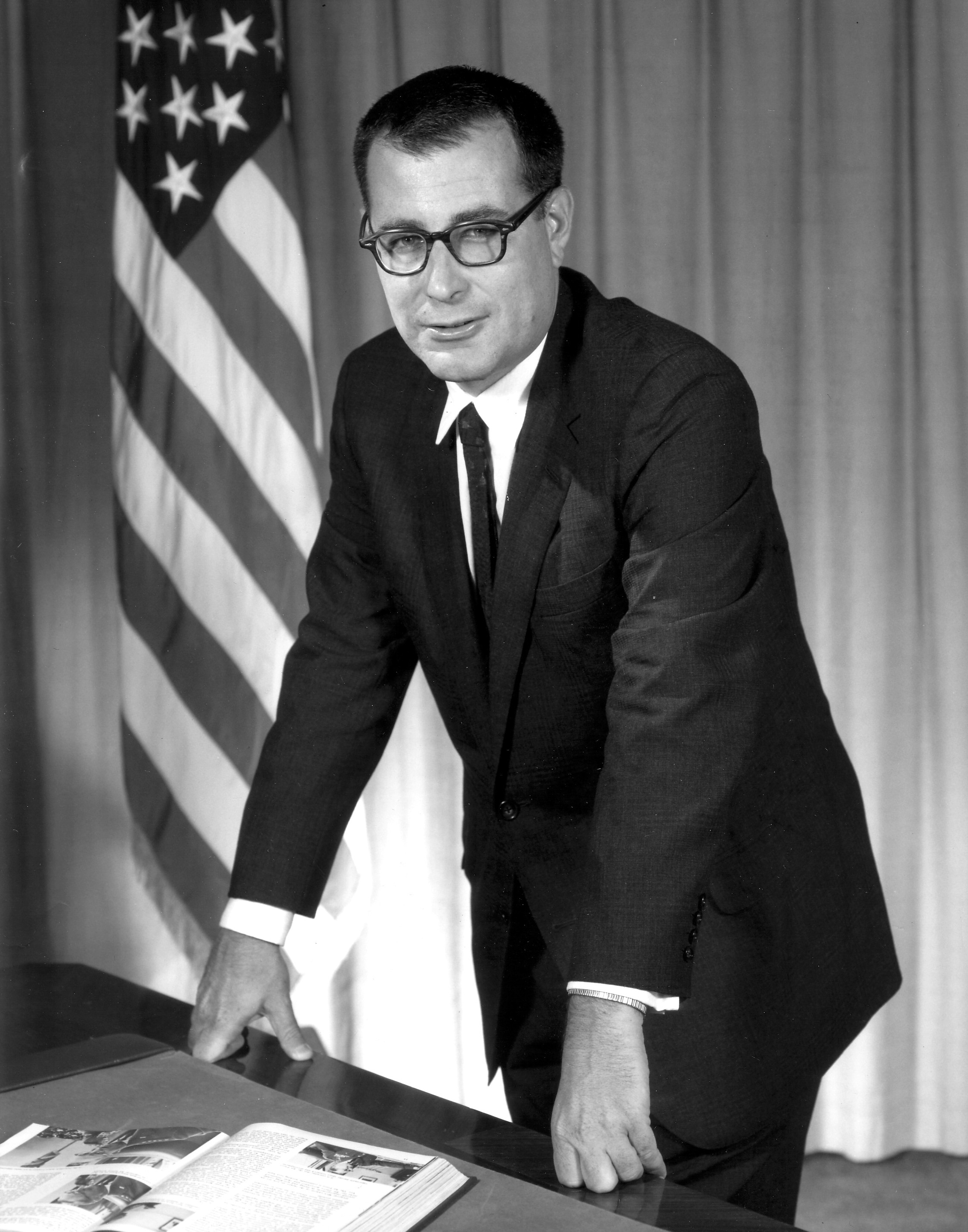
Brown's official portrait.

Although Brown had accumulated almost eight years of prior service in the Pentagon, he was the first natural scientist to become secretary of defense. He involved himself in practically all areas of departmental activity. Consistent with the Carter administration's objective to reorganize the federal government, Brown launched a comprehensive review of defense organization that eventually brought significant change. But he understood the limits to effective reform. In one of his first speeches after leaving office, "'Managing' the Defense Department-Why It Can't Be Done," at the University of Michigan in March 1981, he observed:

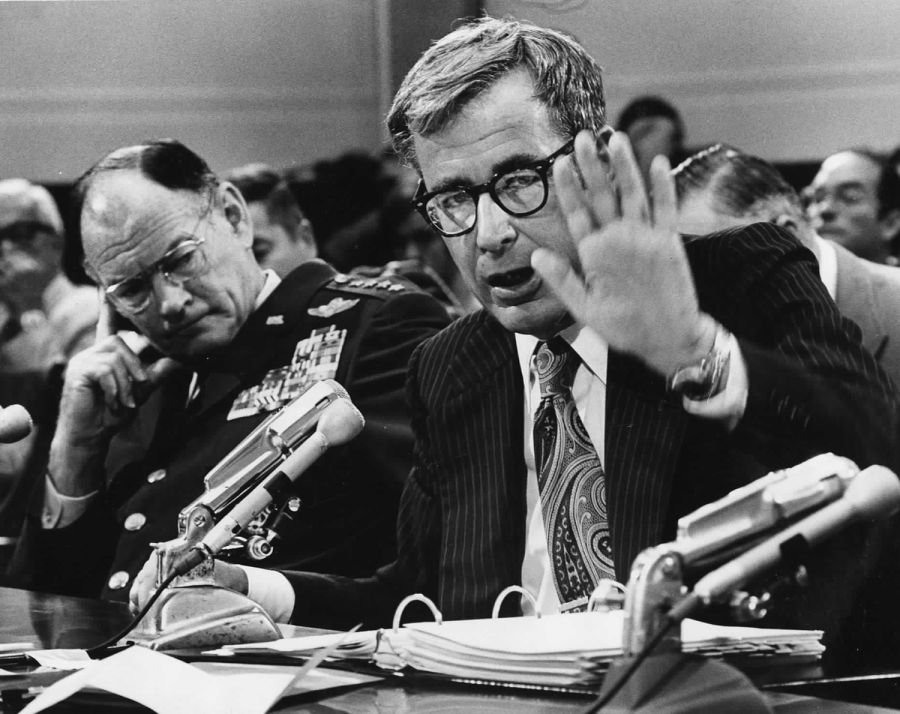
Secretary of Defense Harold Brown and Chairman of The Joint Chiefs of Staff General George S. Brown testifies on Capitol Hill on a defense budget in 1977.

... I want to note again the basic limitation of any attempt to manage the Defense Department in an idealized textbook fashion. The pull of the need to be able to fight a war, if necessary, will always limit the peacetime efficiency of the defense establishment. ... The pull of conflicting domestic interests represents democratic government. ... To manage defense efficiently and at the lowest possible cost along presumed business lines of management and organization is a useful standard. But there are prices we cannot afford to pay for meeting it exactly. One is the abandonment of democratic control. Another is the loss of a war. Defense cannot be "managed" like a business. But it can be led so as to preserve most effectively our national security interests.

With regard to strategic planning, Brown shared much the same concerns as his Republican predecessors—the need to upgrade U.S. military forces and improve collective security arrangements—but with a stronger commitment to arms control. Brown adhered to the principle of "essential equivalence" in the nuclear competition with the Soviet Union. This meant that "Soviet strategic nuclear forces do not become usable instruments of political leverage, diplomatic coercion, or military advantage; nuclear stability, especially in a crisis, is maintained; any advantages in force characteristics enjoyed by the Soviets are offset by U.S. advantages in other characteristics; and the U.S. posture is not in fact, and is not seen as, inferior in performance to the strategic nuclear forces of the Soviet Union." His later writings in his 2012 memoir, Star-Spangled Security, reinforced this agenda:

When I became secretary of defense in 1977, the military services, most of all the army, were disrupted badly by the Vietnam War. There was general agreement that the Soviet Union outclassed the West in conventional military capability, especially in ground forces in Europe.

According to The New York Times, experts say in retrospect that contrary to a popular narrative which asserts that President Ronald Reagan increased defense spending to ramp up competition with (and ultimately bankrupting) the Soviet Union, it was Carter and Brown who began "maintaining the strategic balance, countering Soviet aircraft and ballistic innovations by improving land-based ICBMs, by upgrading B-52 strategic bombers with low-flying cruise missiles and by deploying far more submarine-launched missiles tipped with MIRVs, or multiple warheads that split into independent trajectories to hit many targets".

=== Nuclear missiles ===
Brown considered it essential to maintain the triad of ICBMs, SLBMs, and strategic bombers; some of the administration's most important decisions on weapon systems reflected this commitment. Although he decided not to produce the B-1 bomber, he did recommend upgrading existing B-52s and equipping them with air-launched cruise missiles, and gave the go-ahead for development of a "stealth" technology, fostered by William J. Perry, under-secretary of defense for research and engineering, that would make it possible to produce planes (bombers as well as other aircraft) with very low radar profiles, presumably able to elude enemy defenses and deliver weapons on targets. The administration backed development of the MX missile, intended to replace in the 1980s the increasingly vulnerable Minuteman and Titan intercontinental missiles. To insure MX survivability, Brown recommended deploying the missiles in "multiple protective shelters"; 200 MX missiles would be placed in Utah and Nevada, with each missile to be shuttled among 23 different shelters of its own located along roadways-meaning a total of 4,600 such shelters. Although this plan was expensive and environmentally controversial, Brown argued that it was the most viable scheme to protect the missiles from enemy attack. For the sea leg of the triad, Brown accelerated development of the larger Trident nuclear submarine and carried forward the conversion of Poseidon submarines to a fully MIRVed missile capability.

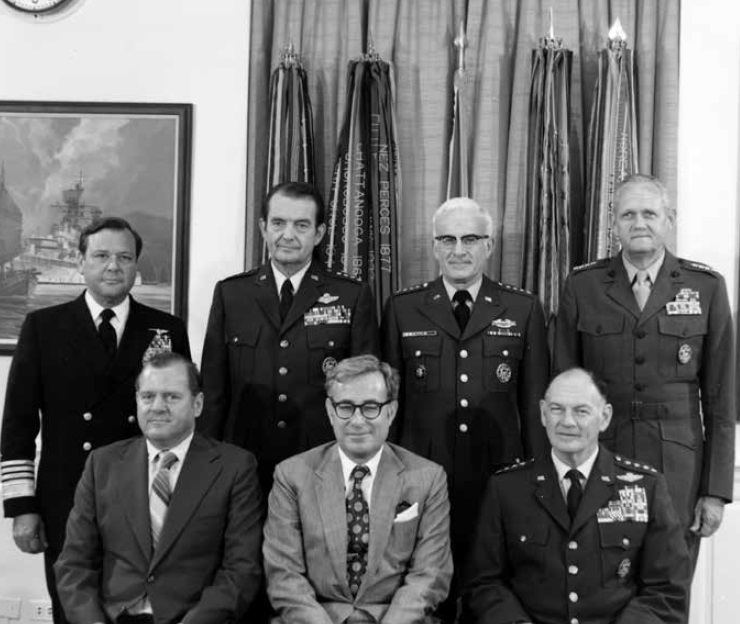
Secretary of Defense Harold Brown with Chairman of The Joint Chiefs of Staff General George S. Brown and Deputy Secretary of Defense Charles W. Duncan Jr and the other members of The Joint Chiefs of Staff at The Pentagon.

By early 1979, Brown and his staff had developed a "countervailing strategy", an approach to nuclear targeting that past secretaries of defense Robert McNamara and James R. Schlesinger had both earlier found attractive, but never formally codified. As Brown put it, "we must have forces and plans for the use of our strategic nuclear forces such that in considering aggression against our interests, our adversary would recognize that no plausible outcome would represent a success-on any rational definition of success. The prospect of such a failure would then deter an adversary's attack on the United States or our vital interests." Although Brown did not rule out the assured destruction approach, which stressed attacks on urban and industrial targets, he believed that "such destruction must not be automatic, our only choice, or independent of any enemy's attack. Indeed, it is at least conceivable that the mission of assured destruction would not have to be executed at all in the event that deterrence failed."

Official adoption of the countervailing strategy came with President Carter's approval of Presidential Directive 59 (PD 59) on July 25, 1980. In explaining PD 59 Brown argued that it was not a new strategic doctrine, but rather a refinement, a codification of previous explanations of our strategic policy. The heart of PD 59, as Brown described it, was as follows:

It is our policy-and we have increasingly the means and the detailed plans to carry out this policy-to ensure that the Soviet leadership knows that if they chose some intermediate level of aggression, we could, by selective, large (but still less than maximum) nuclear attacks, exact an unacceptably high price in the things the Soviet leaders appear to value most—political and military control, military force both nuclear and conventional, and the industrial capability to sustain a war. In our planning we have not ignored the problem of ending the war, nor would we ignore it in the event of a war. And, of course, we have, and we will keep, a survivable and enduring capability to attack the full range of targets, including the Soviet economic base, if that is the appropriate response to a Soviet strike.

Because the almost simultaneous disclosures of PD 59 and the stealth technology came in the midst of the 1980 United States presidential election campaign; some critics asserted that the Carter administration leaked them to counter charges of weakness and boost its re-election chances. Others charged that PD 59 made it more likely that the United States would initiate a nuclear conflict, based on the assumption that a nuclear war could somehow be limited. Brown insisted that the countervailing strategy was not a first strike strategy. As he put it, "Nothing in the policy contemplates that nuclear war can be a deliberate instrument of achieving our national security goals. ... But we cannot afford the risk that the Soviet leadership might entertain the illusion that nuclear war could be an option – or its threat a means of coercion – for them."

=== NATO ===
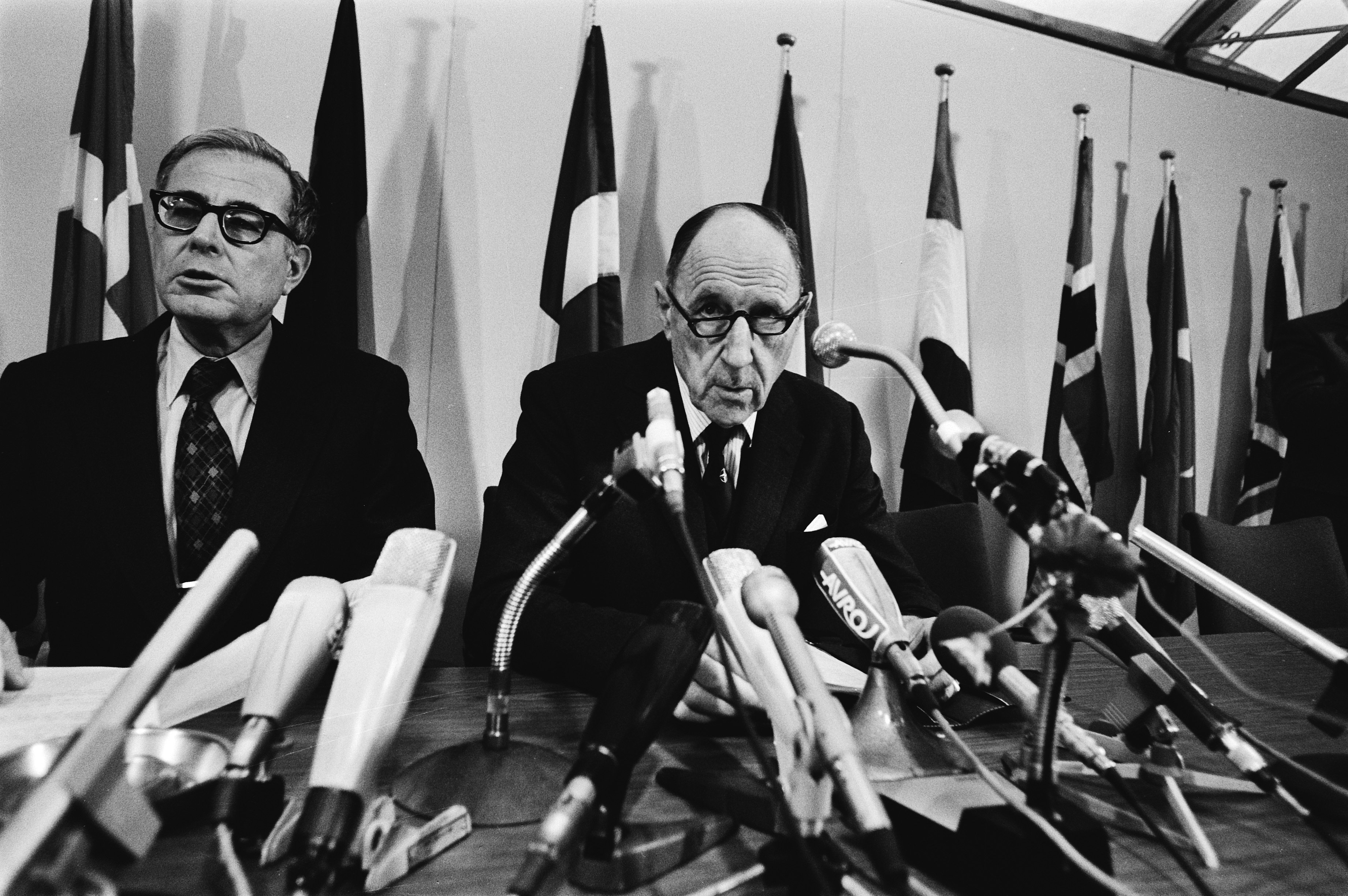
Brown and Joseph Luns in Europe (1979)

Brown regarded the strengthening of NATO as a key national security objective and worked hard to invigorate the alliance. With the assistance of Robert W. Komer, at first his special adviser on NATO affairs and subsequently under-secretary of defense for policy, Brown launched a series of NATO initiatives shortly after taking office. In May 1978 the NATO heads of government endorsed a long term defense program which included 10 priority categories: enhanced readiness; rapid reinforcement; stronger European reserve forces; improvements in maritime capabilities; integrated air defenses; effective command, control, and communications; electronic warfare; rationalized procedures for armaments collaboration; logistics co-ordination and increased war reserves; and theater nuclear modernization. To implement the last item, NATO defense and foreign ministers decided in December 1979, to respond to the Soviet deployment of new theater nuclear weapons—the SS-20 missile and the Backfire bomber—by placing 108 Pershing II missiles and 464 ground-launched cruise missiles (GLCMs) in several Western European countries beginning in December 1983. The NATO leaders indicated that the new missile deployment would be scaled down if satisfactory progress occurred in arms control negotiations with the Soviet Union. At Brown's urging, NATO members pledged in 1977 to increase their individual defense spending three percent per year in real terms for the 1979-86 period. The objective, Brown explained, was to ensure that alliance resources and capabilities-both conventional and nuclear-would balance those of the Soviet bloc. Although some NATO members hesitated to confirm the agreement to accept new missiles and did not always attain the three percent target, Brown was pleased with NATO's progress. Midway in his term he told an interviewer that he thought his most important achievement thus far had been the revitalization of NATO.

Brown also tried to strengthen the defense contributions of U.S. allies outside of NATO, particularly Japan and South Korea. He repeatedly urged the Japanese government to increase its defense budget so that it could shoulder a larger share of the Western allies' Pacific security burden. Although the Carter administration decided in c.July 1977 on a five year, phased withdrawal of United States ground forces from South Korea, it pledged to continue military modernization and other assistance to that country. Later, because of a substantial buildup of North Korean military forces and opposition to the troop withdrawal in the United States, the president shelved the plan, leaving approximately 40,000 U.S. troops in Korea. In establishing diplomatic relations with the People's Republic of China (PRC) on January 1, 1979, the United States formally recognized the PRC almost 30 years after its establishment. A year later Brown visited the PRC, talked with its political and military leaders, and helped lay the groundwork for limited collaboration on security issues.

=== Arms control ===
Arms control formed an integral part of Brown's national security policy. He staunchly supported the June 1979 SALT II treaty between the United States and the Soviet Union and was the administration's leading spokesman in urging the Senate to approve it. SALT II limited both sides to 2,250 strategic nuclear delivery vehicles (bombers, ICBMs, SLBMs, and air-to-surface ballistic missiles), including a sublimit of 1,200 launchers of MIRVed ballistic missiles, of which only 820 could be launchers of MIRVed ICBMs. It also placed restrictions on the number of warheads on each missile and on deployment of new land-based ballistic missile systems, except for one new type of light ICBM for each side. There was also a provision for verification by each side using its own national technical means.

Brown explained that SALT II would reduce the Soviet Union's strategic forces, bring enhanced predictability and stability to Soviet-U.S. nuclear relationships, reduce the cost of maintaining a strategic balance, help the United States to monitor Soviet forces, and reduce the risk of nuclear war. He rebutted charges by SALT II critics that the United States had underestimated the Soviet military buildup, that the treaty would weaken the Western alliance, that the Soviet Union could not be trusted to obey the treaty, and that its terms could not really be verified. Partly to placate Senate opponents of the treaty, the Carter administration agreed in the fall of 1979 to support higher increases in the defense budget. However, the Soviet invasion of Afghanistan in December 1979 ensured that the Senate would not accept the treaty at that time, forcing the president to withdraw it from consideration. When his term ended in 1981, Brown said that failure to secure ratification of SALT II was his greatest regret. The U.S. and the Soviet Union still followed the terms of the pact, even though it was non-binding, until 1986, when President Ronald Reagan accused the Soviet Union of violating the terms and withdrew from the pact.

=== Regional matters ===
==== Panama Canal ====
Besides broad national security policy matters, Brown had to deal with several more immediate questions, among them the Panama Canal issue. Control of the Panama Canal Zone had been a source of contention ever since Panama achieved its independence from Colombia in 1903 and granted the United States a concession "in perpetuity". In the mid-1960s, after serious disturbances in the zone, the United States and Panama began negotiations that went on intermittently until September 7, 1977, when the countries signed two treaties, one providing for full Panamanian control of the canal by the year 2000 and the other guaranteeing the canal's neutrality. The Defense Department played a major role in the Panama negotiations. Brown championed the treaties through a difficult fight to gain Senate approval (secured in March and April 1978), insisting that they were both advantageous to the United States and essential to the canal's future operation and security.

==== Middle East ====
In Middle East affairs, Brown supported President Carter's efforts as an intermediary in the Egyptian-Israeli negotiations leading to the Camp David Accords of September 1978 and the signing by the two nations of a peace treaty in March 1979. Elsewhere, the fall of the Shah from power in Iran in January 1979 eliminated a major U.S. ally and triggered a chain of events that played havoc with American policy in the region. In November 1979, Iranian revolutionaries occupied the U.S. embassy in Tehran and took more than 50 hostages. Brown participated closely in planning for a rescue operation that ended in failure and the loss of eight U.S. servicemen on April 24–25, 1980. Not until the last day of his administration, on January 20, 1981, could President Carter make final arrangements for the release of the hostages.

==== Soviet invasion of Afghanistan ====
The Soviet invasion of Afghanistan in December 1979 to bolster a pro-Soviet Communist government further complicated the role of the United States in the Middle East and Southwest Asia. In response to the events in Iran and Afghanistan and in anticipation of others, Brown activated the Rapid Deployment Joint Task Force (RDJTF) at MacDill Air Force Base, Florida, on March 1, 1980. Although normally a planning headquarters without operational units, the RDJTF could obtain such forces from the several services and command them in crisis situations. Brown explained that the RDJTF was responsible for developing plans for contingency operations, particularly in Southwest Asia, and maintaining adequate capabilities and readiness for such missions.

=== Budget ===
As with all of his predecessors, budget matters occupied a major portion of Brown's time. During the 1976 campaign, President Carter criticized the defense spending levels of the Ford administration and promised cuts in the range of $5 billion to $7 billion. Shortly after he became secretary, Brown suggested a series of amendments to Ford's proposed fiscal year 1978 budget, having the effect of cutting it by almost $3 billion, but still allowing a Total Obligational Authority (TOA) increase of more than $8 billion over the fiscal year 1977 budget. Subsequent budgets under Brown moved generally upward, reflecting high prevailing rates of inflation, the need to strengthen and modernize conventional forces neglected somewhat since the end of the Vietnam War, and serious challenges in the Middle East, Iran, Afghanistan, and elsewhere.

The Brown Defense budgets by fiscal year, in TOA, were as follows: 1978, $116.1 billion; 1979, $124.7 billion; 1980, $141.9 billion; and 1981, $175.5 billion. In terms of real growth, there were slight negative percentages in 1978 and 1979, and increases in 1980 and 1981. Part of the increase for fiscal year 1981 resulted from supplemental appropriations obtained by the Reagan administration; but the Carter administration by this time had departed substantially from its early emphasis on curtailing the department of defense budget. Its proposals for fiscal year 1982, submitted in January 1981, called for significant real growth over the TOA for fiscal year 1981.

In his 2012 memoir, Star-Spangled Security, Brown boasted that "the Defense Department budget in real terms was 10 to 12 percent more when we left than when we came in", which he opined was not an easy accomplishment, especially considering Carter's campaign promise to cut defense spending, and pressure to that effect from congressional Democrats. With the increased budget, Brown oversaw the development of "stealth" aircraft, and the acceleration of "the Trident submarine program and the conversion of older Poseidon submarines to carry MIRVs".

=== Departure ===
Brown left office on January 20, 1981, following President Carter's unsuccessful bid for re-election. During the 1980 campaign, Brown actively defended the Carter administration's policies, speaking frequently on national issues in public.

Brown received the Presidential Medal of Freedom from President Carter in 1981 and the Enrico Fermi Award from President Bill Clinton in 1993.

== Later life ==
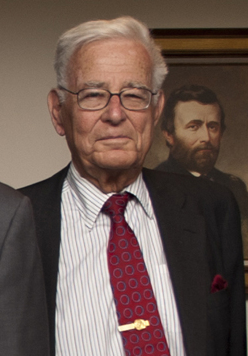
Brown in June 2013

After leaving the Pentagon, Brown remained in Washington, D.C., joining the Johns Hopkins University School of Advanced International Studies as a visiting professor and later the university's Foreign Policy Institute as chairman. He continued to speak and write widely on national security issues, and in 1983 published "Thinking About National Security: Defense and Foreign Policy in a Dangerous World"/ In later years, Brown was affiliated with research organizations and served on the boards of a number of corporations, like Altria (previously Philip Morris).

Brown was honored with Columbia College’s John Jay Award for distinguished professional achievement in 1980 and Alexander Hamilton Medal in 1990.

On January 5, 2006, he participated in a meeting at the White House of former Secretaries of Defense and State to discuss United States foreign policy with Bush administration officials.

In July 2011, Brown became a member of the United States Energy Security Council, which seeks to diminish oil's monopoly over the U.S. transportation sector and is sponsored by the Institute for the Analysis of Global Security (IAGS).

Brown died of pancreatic cancer on January 4, 2019, at the age of 91.

== See also ==
- Harold Brown Award
- Membership discrimination in California social clubs
- Aspin–Brown Commission
- List of Jewish United States Cabinet members

Political offices
Preceded by Herbert F. York	Director of Defense Research and Engineering; May 8, 1961 – September 30, 1965	Succeeded by John S. Foster Jr.
Preceded by Eugene M. Zuckert	8th United States Secretary of the Air Force; October 1, 1965 – February 15, 1969	Succeeded by Robert Seamans
Preceded by Donald Rumsfeld	14th United States Secretary of Defense; January 21, 1977 – January 20, 1981	Succeeded by Caspar Weinberger
Academic offices
Preceded by Lee DuBridge	3rd President of the California Institute of Technology; 1969–1977	Succeeded by Robert Christy acting
