= ICD (disambiguation) =

ICD is the International Statistical Classification of Diseases and Related Health Problems, an international standard diagnostic tool.

ICD may also refer to:

== Organizations ==
- Information Control Division of the US Army in Germany after WWII
- United States Army Medical Research Institute of Chemical Defense (USAMRICD or ICD)
- Iranian Club, Dubai
- Islamic Corporation for the Development of the Private Sector, of the Islamic Development Bank
- International Clothing Designs, UK clothing importer

== Science and technology ==
- In-circuit debugger, in electronic hardware development
- Interface control document, in systems and software engineering
- MPLAB devices ICD (In-circuit debugger)
- Interatomic Coulombic decay, a relaxation process

=== Medicine ===
- Intrauterine contraceptive device
- Immunogenic cell death
- Implantable cardioverter-defibrillator
- Impulse control disorder
- Isobaric counterdiffusion

== Other uses ==
- Doctor of Canon Law (Latin: Iuris Canonici Doctor)
- Incentive-centered design
- Inland container depot of Container Corporation of India
- Independence Commemorative Decoration (postnominal letters), an award in the Rhodesian honours system

== See also ==
- Intelligence Community Directive 301 (ICD-301)
