= Stèphanie de Montaneis =

Stèphanie de Montaneis was a purported mid-13th century physician from Lyons mentioned in Muriel Joy Hughes's Women Healers in Medieval Life and Literature.

In the relevant section, concerning physicians training their daughters in medicine, Hughes states:

"Étienne de Montaneis, a physician in Lyons, in all probability trained his daughter, Stèphanie, in the art of healing, for she was referred to in 1265 as medica."

However, in Hughes's stated source book, George's Guigue's publication of Lyon's archives as Bibliothèque historique du Lyonnais, the relevant passage, which concerns a land grant to an abbey in January 1265, is as follows:

"Nos suror Bruna, himilis abbatissa Sancti Petri monialium Lugdunensis, notum facimus universis presentes literas inspecturis quod Martina, relicta Jaquemeti del Clos defuncti, civis Lugdunensis, coram nobis constituta, sciens, prudens et spontanea, vendit, tradit, cedit et concedit Andree, marito Agnetis, sororis fratris Petri, reclusi Sancti Yrenei Lugdunensis, pro precio centum solidorum viennensium, de quibus dicta Martina venditrix se tenet coram nobis integre pro pagata, quandam dimidiam pedam terra cum quadum domuncula sita ibidem, que demidia oeda sita est juxta terram Guillielmi, Pelliparii, ex una parte, et juxta terram Stephane, medice, quondam filie Stephani de Montaneis, medici, ex altera."

Which translated, means:

"We, Sister Bruna, humble abbess of the nuns of Saint Peter of Lyon, make it known to all who shall inspect these present letters that Martina, widow of the deceased Jaquemet del Clos, a citizen of Lyon, appearing before us, knowing, wise and voluntary, sells, transfers, assigns and grants to Andrew, husband of Agnes, sister of Brother Peter, recluse of Saint Irenaeus of Lyon, for the price of one hundred Viennese solidi, which the said seller Martina acknowledges before us as fully paid, a certain half foot of land with a little house situated therein, which half foot of land is located next to the land of William, the Furrier [or Tanner], on one side, and next to the land of Stephen, a physician, formerly the son of Stephen of Montaneis, physician, on the other."

Which seems to imply that Stèphanie de Montaneis's existence was based on a faulty translation.

Stèphanie de Montaneis' name is included on the tiles of the Heritage Floor of Judy Chicago's art installation The Dinner Party.
