= World News Connection =

World News Connection was a compilation of current international news translated into the English language. The United States Department of Commerce National Technical Information Service compiled and distributed it from non-U.S. media sources, usually within 24–72 hours from the time of the original publication or broadcast.

It provided the full text of newspaper articles, television and radio broadcasts, online sources, conference proceedings, periodicals, and non-classified technical reports. This information was collected and translated to aid decision makers at the highest levels of the executive and legislative branches of the U.S. Government who needed to know what was happening abroad and how it was being reported locally. WNC was especially useful for access to local thoughts and perceptions for those who didn't know the local language. It covered 130 countries, including many out of the way places not generally covered by other news services. It also contained news analyses by OSC specialists.

World News Connection was the online offering from the Open Source Center (OSC) (formerly the Foreign Broadcast Information Service (FBIS)) that replaced the hard-copy regionally oriented "pink books" that used to be published. Due to a shift in the 1990s toward copyright compliance, the online version was a limited rendition (about half) of what is available for internal government use.

DIALOG, a commercial search service under ProQuest, offered a fee-based means of accessing WNC content. WNC material was also available from Acquire Media, Country Watch, East View Information Services, NISC Pty Ltd (South Africa), and Westlaw.

The World News Connection shut down on December 31, 2013.

== See also ==
- BBC Monitoring
- National Virtual Translation Center
