= Offset strategy =

Compensation for disadvantage

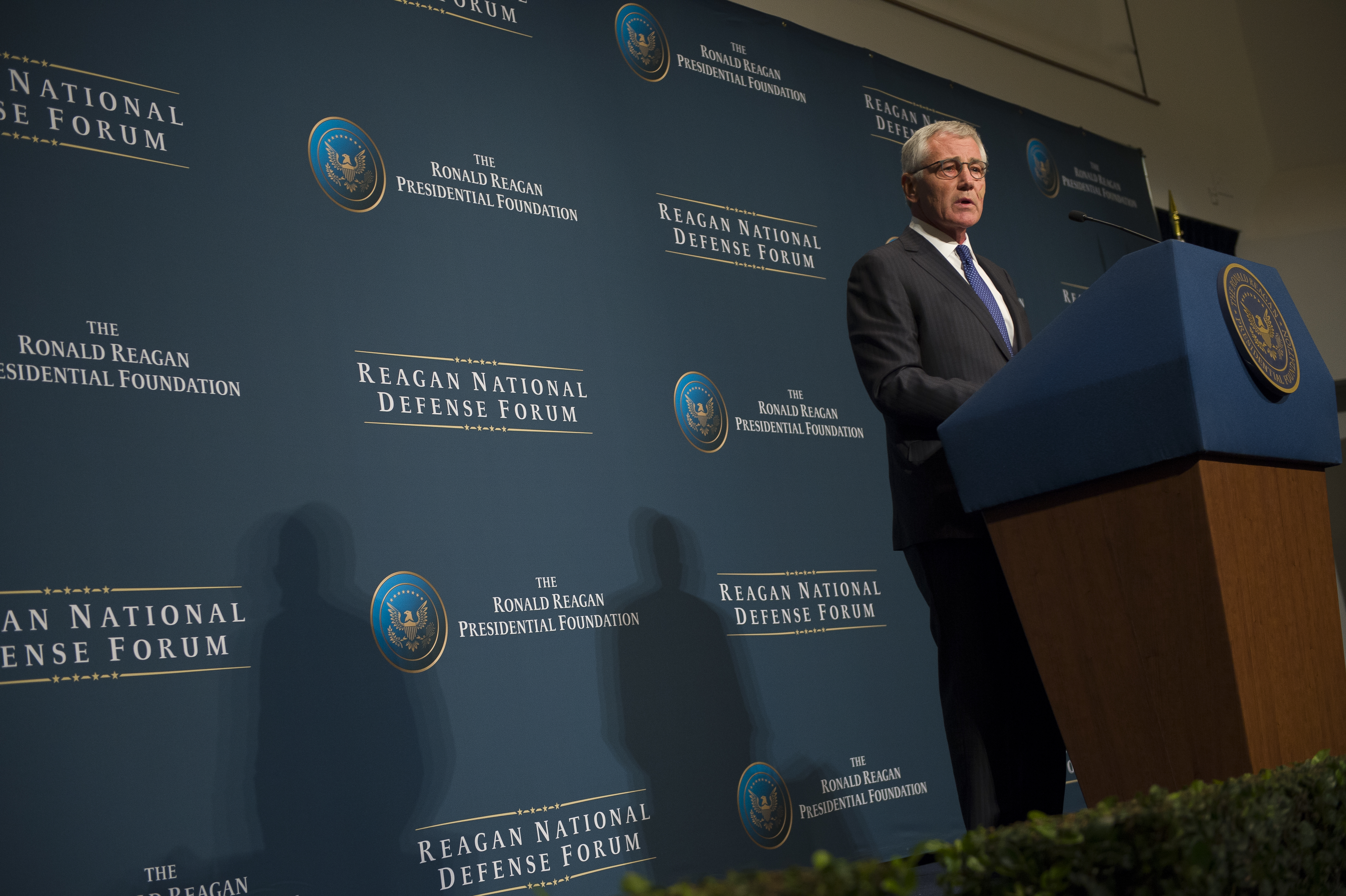
Secretary of Defense Chuck Hagel announces the Defense Innovation Initiative and a Third Offset Strategy during the Reagan National Defense Forum at The Ronald Reagan Presidential Library in Simi Valley, Calif., Nov. 15, 2014.

An offset is some means of asymmetrically compensating for a disadvantage, particularly in a military competition. Rather than match an opponent in an unfavorable competition, changing the competition to more favorable footing enables the application of strengths to a problem that is otherwise either unwinnable or winnable only at unacceptable cost. An offset strategy consequently seeks to deliberately change an unattractive competition to one more advantageous for the implementer. In this way, an offset strategy is a type of competitive strategy that seeks to maintain advantage over potential adversaries over long periods of time while preserving peace where possible.

== 1950s: First Offset Strategy ==
The term is used officially to characterize the capabilities of the U.S. military in comparison to possible opponents. Two periods from the Cold War are treated as canonical cases. In the 1950s, President Eisenhower emphasized nuclear deterrence to avoid the larger expenditures necessary to conventionally deter the Warsaw Pact. In a second period from about 1975 to 1989 the term “Offset Strategy” returned, again referring to technological superiority to offset quantitative inferiority in conventional forces.

== Second Offset Strategy ==
Following the Vietnam War, U.S. defense expenditures declined. By the mid-1970s, the U.S. Department of Defense’s annual budget fell by nearly $100 billion in FY 2015 dollars when compared to the peak in defense spending during the late 1960s. Warsaw Pact forces outnumbered NATO forces by three to one in Europe and DoD did not have the funds to increase forces sufficiently to match. Secretary of Defense Harold Brown therefore sought technological means to “offset” the numerical advantages held by U.S. adversaries and restore deterrence stability in Europe.

Secretary Brown's “Offset Strategy” emphasized new intelligence, surveillance, and reconnaissance (ISR) platforms, improvements in precision-guided weapons, stealth technology, and space-based military communications and navigation. These initiatives were guided by a long-range research and development plan for component technologies and systems led by DARPA.

Key resulting systems include the Airborne Warning and Control System (AWACS) found on the E-2s and E-3s, the F-117 stealth fighter and its successors, modern precision-guided munitions, the Global Positioning System (GPS), and improved reconnaissance, communications, and battle management. Although the U.S. never used Offset Strategy's technologies against the Soviet forces, they directly led to the ease with which the United States expelled Iraqi Forces from Kuwait during Desert Storm. Some historians and military analysts treat the Cold War Offset Strategy as a source of a new "American Way of War" which redirected American military innovation toward a new era of persistent conflict and hybrid wars.

== Third Offset Strategy ==
A Third Offset Strategy is associated with the Defense Innovation Initiative announced by Secretary of Defense Chuck Hagel at the 2014 Reagan Defense Forum, and U.S. strengths in particular technologies and warfighting domains to offset growing disadvantages U.S. forces face against anti-access/area denial (A2/AD) systems.

The Defense Department's Third Offset Strategy, which seeks to outmaneuver advantages made by top adversaries primarily through technology, is at heart based on the time-honored military concepts of being able to win a war if necessary but also having enough capability to deter one. The U.S. Department of Defense's Defense Innovation Initiative was announced in November 2014. A core component of the initiative is the formation of a Long-Range Research and Development Planning Program that will purportedly target several promising technology areas, including robotics and system autonomy, miniaturization, big data, and advanced manufacturing, while also seeking to improve the U.S. military's collaboration with innovative private sector enterprises.

The Center for Strategic and Budgetary Assessments released a report outlining the potential components of a Third Offset Strategy in October 2014, shortly before Secretary Hagel's announcement. The report emphasizes the development of next-generation power projection platforms like unmanned autonomous strike aircraft, the acceleration of the LRS-B, additional investments in undersea warfare systems like Unmanned Underwater Vehicles, and steps to reduce U.S. and partner vulnerability to the loss of space-based communications. The principles of the Third Offset Strategy were reflected in the 2018 National Defense Strategy.

== See also ==
- Competitive advantage
