= Dan Butler (civil servant) =

American intelligence officer

Assistant Deputy Director of National Intelligence for Open Source

Personal details
- Born: Daniel S. Butler (United States) U.S.
- Profession: Intelligence officer

DNI Seal

Daniel S. Butler is the second Assistant Deputy Director of National Intelligence for Open Source (ADDNI/OS). As such, he is responsible for developing strategic direction, establishing policy and managing fiscal resources for open source exploitation as well as document and media exploitation for the Office of the Director of National Intelligence (ODNI).

== Air Force Office of Special Investigations ==
Prior to joining the ODNI, Mr. Butler was executive director of the U.S. Air Force Office of Special Investigations (AFOSI), at Andrews Air Force Base, MD. In this capacity, he served as adviser to the AFOSI Commander, oversaw the AFOSI Special Investigations Career Program and was responsible for executive-level policy coordination, liaison, and representation to national and international organizations.

== Naval Criminal Investigative Service ==
Mr. Butler worked for seven years at Headquarters Naval Criminal Investigative Service in Washington, D.C., where he was Deputy Assistant Director for Government Liaison and Public Affairs, and executive assistant to the Director and Coordinator of Strategic Planning. He was appointed to the Senior Executive Service in December 2000.

== US Navy ==
Mr. Butler served on active duty with the United States Navy from 1981 to 1991 as an intelligence officer. After his release from the Navy in 1991, he served as a Naval Reserve officer assigned to the Joint Military Intelligence College as an adjunct professor. He retired from the Naval Reserve in 2002.

Government offices
Preceded by Eliot A. Jardines	Assistant Deputy Director of National Intelligence for Open Source; April 2008 – Present	Succeeded by Incumbent
