= Intelligence Community Directive 301 =

Intelligence Community Directive 301 is a rescinded United States Intelligence Community Directive issued in 2006 to emphasise open source intelligence as the source of first resort among the intelligence community. The directive was motivated by the 9/11 terrorist attacks, creating interest for intelligence disciplines to work collectively to assess and predict threats to the United States. Intelligence Community Directive 301 outlined responsibilities and established policies for the intelligence community regarding open source intelligence activities. It was rescinded in 2012.

== Background ==
Intelligence Community Directive 301 (ICD-301) took effect on July 11, 2006 when it was signed by the first Director of National Intelligence, John Negroponte, under the Bush Administration. The directive outlines responsibilities for oversight and management needed for open-source intelligence activities within the intelligence community.

The goal of ICD-301 was establishing priority of open source information as the intelligence community's first consulted source type, or "source of first resort". Following the 9/11 terrorist attacks motivated a movement for the intelligence community to utilize many different disciplines of intelligence collectively to better assess and predict threats to the United States.

ICD-301 outlined responsibilities of the Assistant Deputy Director of National Intelligence for Open Source, the Open Source Committee, the Open Source Advisors Board, the Director of National Intelligence Open Source Center (now the Open Source Enterprise) and the remainder of the intelligence community. These entities are responsible for the effective and efficient conduct of open source activities. The directive repealed the Director of Central Intelligence Directive 1/7 intelligence community open source program established on September 26, 2000.

ICD-301 was rescinded in 2012, as ICD 113 provided sufficient responsibility and oversight guidelines. ICD 301 was the second directive in the 300 series, which addressed methods of collection. Among this series are; ICD-300 concerning management of intelligence collection and covert action this ICD prefaced ICD-301 being signed in 2006. ICD-302 concerning media exploitation was signed in 2007 and ICD-304 on human intelligence collection signed into action in 2009 were the two ICD's that followed ICD-301. ICD-310 and ICD 311 dealt with human based foreign intelligence collection and counter intelligence within and from outside the United States respectively.

== Policies ==
ICD-301 established two main policies:

1)The Director of National Intelligence sought to further emphasize the use of open source information and analysis, through a more structured and fluid information sharing system among all intelligence community members.

2) Policies within the intelligence community:

- Centralize strategy, oversight and evaluation under the Assistant Deputy Director of National Intelligence for Open Source.
- Responsibility to share information to the maximum extent possible among intelligence community, public/ private sector, other United States Government agencies, and foreign partners.
- Sharing open source collection and exploitation tools or capabilities to the fullest extent, to be validated by the Assistant Deputy Director of National Intelligence for Open Source and to be potentially standardized by the intelligence community.
- Open source intelligence will support all other types of intelligence gathering and exploitation efforts.
- Open source exploiters and analysts will follow proper information security protocol set by the Director of National Intelligence.
- All open source exploiters will validate and verify their information sources appropriately set by the Director of National Intelligence.
- Feedback processes will be coordinated with the Assistant Deputy Director of National Intelligence for Open Source to evaluate return on investment, customer satisfaction, and inform strategy on resource decision making.

== Authorities and Responsibilities ==
ICD-301 outlines the authorities and responsibilities of five main groups as well as miscellaneous responsibilities:

1)Assistant Deputy Director of National Intelligence for Open Source responsibilities;

- Responsibilities and Authorities within the Open Source Enterprise;
1. Intelligence community open source strategy aligns with Presidential priorities.
2. Tasking, oversight, policy direction, and evaluation of open source intelligence exploitation organizations.
3. Advise tasking of open source collection activities outside the National Intelligence Program.
4. Oversight and deployment of National Open Source Enterprise.
5. Coordination between the Chief Financial Officer, and the Deputy Director of National Intelligence for Customer Outcomes to establish program guidelines of Presidential priorities.
6. Oversight of the Program Manager compliance between the Chief Financial Officer, and the Deputy Director of National Intelligence for Customer Outcomes.
- Coordinating requirements that share common concern.
1. Oversight of collection tools and services for exploitation purposes.
2. Open source, interagency, information sharing oversight.
3. Guidance role to the Director of the Central Intelligence Agency, on behalf of the Director of National Intelligence, and the Deputy Director of National Intelligence for Collection.
- Assistant Deputy Director of National Intelligence for Open Source will provide the Assistant Deputy Director of National Intelligence for Technology and the Assistant Deputy Director of National Intelligence with capability information and report intelligence gaps that cannot be met with off the self capabilities either it be commercial or governmental.
- The Assistant Deputy Director of National Intelligence for Open Source will act as the chair of the National Open Source Committee.
- Assistant Deputy Director of National Intelligence for Open Source will manage the board of advisors for open source.
- Assistant Deputy Director of National Intelligence for Open Source will serve as the chair for the National Media Exploitation Center, and National Virtual Translation Center.

2) National Open Source Center responsibilities;

- The National Open Source Center, is tasked to provide guidance to the National Open Source Enterprise, and consists of senior members from;
1. Assistant Deputy Director of National Intelligence for Open Source as chair.
2. Office of the Under Secretary of Defense for Intelligence.
3. Department of Homeland Security.
4. The Central Intelligence Agency .
5. National Security Agency.
6. National Geospatial-Intelligence Agency.
7. Department of State's Bureau of Intelligence and Research.
8. Defense Intelligence Agency.
9. Federal Bureau of Investigation.
10. Office of the Associate Director of National Intelligence and Chief Information Officer.
11. Other members as determined by the Assistant Deputy Director of National Intelligence for Open Source.
- The Open Source Center will advise as well as report to the Deputy Director of National Intelligence for Collections and when requested;
1. Provide resource recommendation, and strategy.
2. Develop operational strategies in tradecraft, information verification, and training.
3. Coordinate with the Associate Director of National Intelligence and Chief Information Officer and the Associate Director of National Intelligence of Science and Technology to develop standards on data storage, interfacing, and metadata tagging.
4. Inform on open source intelligence gaps, and capabilities.
5. Provide recommendations to other intelligence agencies on open source exploitation.
- The National Open Source Committee will form groups to address items of interest within the intelligence community.

3) The Open Source Advisors Board responsibilities;

- Will consist of senior experts both within and outside the United States Government, The Deputy Director of National Intelligence for Collection is responsible for creating the board, it will provide guidance to the Office of the Director of National Intelligence, and other United States Government agencies.
- When established the board will publish a carter that must be approved by The Deputy Director of National Intelligence for Collection, and will be reviewed annually.

4) Responsibilities of the Director of National Intelligence Open Source Center and the Director of the Central Intelligence Agency as and Executive Agent;

- Aid in exploitation of open source information as well as facilitates sharing of products, information, and services among United States Governmental agencies.
- The Director of the Central Intelligence Agency, will act as the Executive Agent over the Center and will govern day-to-day operations ensuring compliance with the strategy set in place by the Assistant Deputy Director of National Intelligence for Open Source.
- The Center will build on former Foreign Broadcast Information Service, that includes personnel from across the intelligence community and United States Government organizations.
- The Center will act as a service on common concern and;
1. Support development and implementation of open source strategy, policy, and program decision.
2. Participates in the National Open Source Committee.
3. Makes open source information is available to all customers in a timely manner.
4. Helps United States Government partners and customers with open source exploitation.
5. Acquires proper licensing to provide access to all open source consumers.
6. Provides expertise to government agencies when requested.
7. Develop and promote open source programs to expose members of the intelligence community to open source, and trains them in exploitation.
8. Trains intelligence community personnel to follow proper information security protocol with open source intelligence.
9. The Center will provide common concern open source collection, analysis, procurement, dissemination, unless otherwise directed.

5) Responsibilities of the intelligence community elements; Intelligence community elements will;

- Collect, analyze, and disseminate open source materials, via the Associate Director of National Intelligence and Chief Information Officer's information sharing standard.
1. Make open source information available across the entire intelligence community unless forbidden by law.
2. Accurately source information and material to meet unique requirements.
3. Avoid duplication of information by keeping the Assistant Deputy Director of National Intelligence for Open Source up to date on activities.
4. Appoint an open source coordinator within each agency and department to participate in the Open Source Enterprise.
5. Provide participants for National Open Source Committee activities and working groups.
6. Support the Open Source Centers staffing needs.
7. Maximize use of open source information, expertise, and capabilities to aid collection strategies.
8. Institutionalize information sharing along Federal lines to help build a complete repository of open source information.
9. Implement a technological means for efficient data sharing that complies with common intelligence community policies, services and standards.
10. Inform the Assistant Deputy Director of National Intelligence for Open Source if there are any unique open source collection or analysis capabilities.

6) Additional miscellaneous responsibilities;

- The Department of State will provide the Open Source Center with maps, foreign, publications, and geographic data when requested.
- The National Geospatial Agency will provide imagery and geospatial data for other Federal agencies upon request.
- The Deputy Director of National Intelligence for Management is responsible for executing the Director of National Intelligence's milestone decisions, and coordinating activities defined as important by the intelligence community.
- The Associate Director of National Intelligence and Chief Information Officer is responsible for coordinating with other open source providers that proper technological means of information sharing are in place.
- The Deputy Director of National Intelligence for Analysis is responsible to making sure the intelligence community uses open source information efficiently and effectively.
- The Deputy Director of National Intelligence for Customer Outcomes, is charged with developing a method to assess customer satisfaction, to be used in future strategies, return on investments, and resource decision making.
- The National Counterintelligence Executive will support open source activities, tradecraft, exploitation, and information security trainings.
