= Eliot A. Jardines =

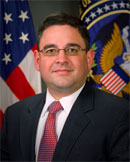

Assistant Deputy Director of National Intelligence for Open Source

Personal details
- Born: birth date unknown New York City, New York; United States
- Profession: Intelligence officer

DNI Seal

Eliot A. Jardines was the first Assistant Deputy Director of National Intelligence for Open Source (ADDNI/OS) in the United States.

== Early life and education ==
Born in New York City to a Cuban father and Costa Rican mother, Jardines is fluent in Spanish and was raised in Fairfield, Connecticut. As a teenager, he achieved the rank of Eagle Scout (Boy Scouts of America). He is a graduate of the University of New Mexico with a dual degree in political science and Latin American studies. He received a Master of Arts degree in international studies from the University of Connecticut and a Master of Science in Strategic Intelligence degree from the Joint Military Intelligence College. He is currently pursuing a doctorate in Executive Leadership at George Washington University.

== Military career ==
Jardines served in military intelligence assignments overseas and in the United States in both the active Army and the Army Reserve. He got his start in open source intelligence as a member of the US Army's 434th Military Intelligence Detachment (Strategic), which was affiliated with Yale University and commanded by then Colonel Rob Simmons, a former Connecticut Congressman. According to press reports, Jardines ran OSINT efforts at the 66th Military Intelligence Group in Augsburg, Germany.

== Business career (1996–2005) ==
Mr. Jardines was the founder and president of Open Source Publishing, Inc., a privately held firm providing open source intelligence support to the public and private sectors. The firm was acquired by Radiance Technologies, Inc., where he served as the director of the Radiance Open Source Intelligence Division.

== Assistant Deputy Director of National Intelligence (2005–2008) ==
Assuming his position on 5 December 2005, he was responsible for developing strategic direction, establishing policy and managing fiscal resources for open source exploitation as well as document and media exploitation for the Office of the Director of National Intelligence (ODNI).

He is notable as the foremost U.S. federal government authority with respect to Open source intelligence, for establishing the National Open Source Enterprise and for authoring ICD301. According to an intelligence blogger, Jardines was a contender for the CIA Director position when Porter Goss resigned.

== Current position ==
Jardines returned to the private sector as the Chief Knowledge Officer of CENTRA Technology, Inc. in April 2008. He currently serves on the Loudoun County Criminal Justice Board, Clarke County Sheriff's Office Advisory Council, and the Shenandoah University Business School Advisory Board.

Government offices
Preceded by Initial ADDNI/OS	Assistant Deputy Director of National Intelligence for Open Source; December 2005 – April 2008	Succeeded by Dan Butler (civil servant)
