= Shelly Zegart =

American quilt collector and advocate (1941–2025)

- Zegart in 2018, wrapped in a quilt
- Born: Rochelle Weiss; March 11, 1941; Pittsburgh, Pennsylvania
- Died: July 22, 2025 (aged 84); Louisville, Kentucky
- Education: University of Michigan
- Known for: Quilting art advocacy work
- Spouse: Kenneth Norton Zegart (m. 1962; died 2025)
- Children: 2, including Amy Zegart, Terri Zegart
- Website: www.shellyquilts.com

Rochelle Zegart (née Weiss; March 11, 1941 – July 22, 2025) was an American quilt collector, historian, and advocate. She was involved in the establishment of several quilting organizations and is best known for her work promoting quilting as an art form and archiving quilting history.

== Early life and education ==
Shelly Zegart was born Rochelle Weiss in Pittsburgh, Pennsylvania on March 11, 1941. Her mother, Thelma (1915–2011), was born in Monongahela, Pennsylvania, and was a pianist and member of an all-female band that travelled the East Coast of the United States in the 1930s. Her father, David H. Weiss (1905–1979), was a Jewish refugee who fled from Czechoslovakia to the United States. He served 6 terms as a Pennsylvania state representative starting in 1937, then as assistant district attorney, and then was elected as a judge.

Zegart was raised in Monessen, Pennsylvania, and had two siblings. The family was one of the few Jewish families in their town. (Note: For more information about the history of Jewish people in the state, see History of the Jews in Pennsylvania.) As a child, she was interested in collecting, and often went antiquing with her mother.

She earned a Bachelor's degree in education at the University of Michigan. In 1968 she moved with her family to Louisville, Kentucky.

== Quilting career ==
She developed an interest in quilts in the 1970s and began decorating her home with them. From then on, she was a quilt collector, lecturer, exhibition curator and an author on various aspects of quilt history and aesthetics. Zegart owned a personal collection of nineteenth- and twentieth-century quilts. Zegart's collection was popular with Japanese audiences and international quilt enthusiasts. She worked against the exclusion of quilts from the art world and the diminishment of women's art as "women's work", and advocated for quilting to be taken seriously and treated just like any other art form.

Zegart was an early leader of quilt documentation in the United States. Zegart, Eleanor Bingham Miller, and Eunice Ray came together in 1981 to found The Kentucky Quilt Project, the first statewide quilt documentation project in the United States. This project grew into Kentucky to the World, which she founded in 2013 and was the CEO of until her death. She co-founded the Alliance for American Quilts (also known as the Quilt Alliance) in 1993 and led its development until 2006, and was involved in the establishment of the Quilt Index. Her first international project was a 1987 exhibit of Kentucky quilts for the Women's Committee of the National Trust of Australia in Sydney.

Her book American Quilt Collections: Antique Quilt Masterpieces was published by Nihon Vogue Ltd. in Tokyo in the late 1990s. In her latest days, she was executive producer and host of the nine-part documentary series Why Quilts Matter, History, Art & Politics, which aired on KET (Kentucky's public television station) and other PBS stations across the United States. Zegart spoke at events for groups such as the Rotary Club of Louisville, and appeared on KET's Kentucky Collectibles show, appraising the value of a quilt and discussing its history with a guest. She gave lectures on topics such as "Quilts as Women's Art", "Political Quilts", and "Misperceptions versus Reality in the World of Old Quilts." She also wrote articles about quilting history, including the history of individual quilts, both antique and contemporary.

In 2001, the Art Institute of Chicago acquired Zegart's collection. Her personal files, along with the records of the Kentucky Quilt Project and the Alliance for American Quilts, were donated to the University of Louisville. Zegart also donated her personal library of quilt and decorative arts publications to Western Kentucky University. She facilitated Judy Chicago's 2014 donation of the International Honor Quilt to the University of Louisville. Her work and legacy was highlighted in the 2008 exhibition titled Shelly Zegart: Passionate About Quilts.

== Personal life ==
She married her husband, Kenneth Zegart, on June 17, 1962. Kenneth was an OB/GYN and a hobbyist magician. The two antiqued and visited flea markets together, and shared a passion for women's art. Some of the quilts they bought were displayed on the walls of Kenneth's clinic, and according to Kentucky to the World, this act "exemplified the shared values of their marriage: thoughtful beauty, respect for women’s stories, and the power of art to create comfort." Shelly was Jewish, and according to Kentucky to the World, she "lived the idea of tikkun olam, the Jewish call to repair the world."

Kenneth died on May 6, 2025. Shelly died weeks later, on July 22, 2025, at her home in Louisville. She was 84. Her services were held at Congregation Adath Israel Brith Sholom.

The Zegarts' daughter, Amy Zegart, is a professor and expert in national intelligence and cybersecurity.

== Awards and legacy ==
In 2020, Kentucky Governor Andy Beshear awarded her the Folk Heritage Award for her work advocating for the quilting medium and for quilt artists.

== List of works ==
=== Writing ===
- "Old Maid, New Woman" (1986), originally published in The Quilt Digest
- "The Ties That Bind Friendship Quilt" – May 1995
- American Quilt Collections: Antique Quilt Masterpieces (1997)

== See also ==
=== Topics ===
- Culture of Kentucky
- History of quilting
- Feminist art movement (and in the United States)
- List of quilters
- Women artists
- Women in the art history field
- Women's history
- Women's studies

=== People ===
- Barbara Brackman
- Eleanor Burns
- Judy Chicago
- Suzanne Lacy
- Bonnie Leman
- Alma Lesch

=== Miscellaneous ===
- The Women's Art Collection
- Studio Art Quilt Associates
