= Open Source Enterprise =

US government organization

Coordinates: 38.9552°N 77.3602°W

The Open Source Enterprise (OSE) is a United States government organization dedicated to open-source intelligence. Initially part of the Office of the Director of National Intelligence, it is now part of the Directorate of Digital Innovation at the Central Intelligence Agency (CIA). Former iterations of the organization were the Open Source Center (OSC) and the Foreign Broadcast Information Service (FBIS).

== History ==
In the fall of November 1992, Senator David Boren, then chairman of the Senate Select Committee on Intelligence, sponsored the National Security Act of 1992, attempting to achieve modest reform in the U.S. Intelligence Community. His counterpart on the House Permanent Select Committee on Intelligence was Congressman Dave McCurdy. The House version of the legislation included a separate Open Source Office, at the suggestion of Larry Prior, a Marine Reservist with Marine Corps Intelligence Command experience then serving on the House Permanent Select Committee on Intelligence staff.

The Aspin-Brown Commission stated in 1996 that US access to open sources was "severely deficient" and that this should be a "top priority" for both funding and DCI attention.

In issuing its July 2004 report, the 9/11 Commission recommended the creation of an open source intelligence agency, but without further detail or comment. Subsequently, the WMD Commission (also known as the Robb-Silberman Commission) report in March 2005 recommended the creation of an Open Source Directorate at the CIA.

Following these recommendations, in November 2005 the Director of National Intelligence announced the creation of the DNI Open Source Center. The Center was established to collect information available from "the Internet, databases, press, radio, television, video, geospatial data, photos and commercial imagery." In addition to collecting openly available information, it would train analysts to make better use of this information. Central to the establishment of the new organization was Assistant Deputy Director of National Intelligence for Open Source (ADDNI/OS), Eliot A. Jardines. The OSC absorbed the CIA's previously existing Foreign Broadcast Information Service (FBIS), originally established in 1941, with FBIS head Douglas Naquin named as director of the Center.

In response to the Cuban Missile Crisis and START Treaty, FBIS was tasked with monitoring for clandestine and encoded messages from all nations and coordinating broadcast media contact points who could instantly broadcast urgent messages on "All Channels" and "All Calls" and mutually receive messages in all languages and codings from any foreign broadcast station. This task continues despite the Open Source Center's DNI reorganization.

On October 1, 2015, the OSC changed its name to Open Source Enterprise and was absorbed into the CIA's Directorate of Digital Innovation. On December 21, 2022, Randy Nixon was appointed as director of OSE, having previously served as the CIA's Director of Digital Futures. Nixon served as director until September 2025.

== Services ==
OSE provides material to the National Technical Information Service (NTIS) and other government officials through the online news service World News Connection.

== Facilities ==
The headquarters of OSE is located in the Reston Town Center development in Reston, Virginia, in the former headquarters of the FBIS. The construction of the facility sparked some controversy in Reston, a planned community, due to the presence of a chained linked and barbed wire fence surrounding the buildings. In the late 1980s, the CIA agreed to install a more aesthetically pleasing fence around the buildings.

From 1943 until 2017, OSE operated a facility at Caversham Park alongside the UK's equivalent open-source intelligence service, BBC Monitoring. In an information-sharing collaboration at Caversham, BBC Monitoring handled media from 25% of the world while Open Source handled the remaining 75%. The division was closed in October 2017.

== See also ==
- Open Source Intelligence
- Foreign Broadcast Information Service
