= Quilt of Belonging =

Textile arts project

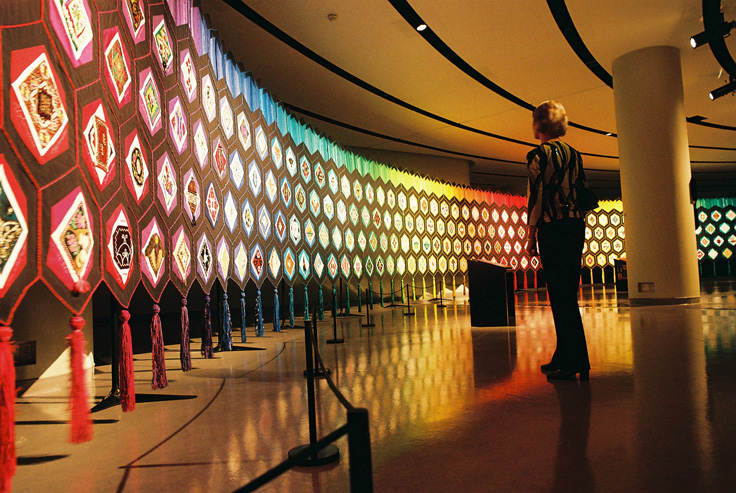
The Quilt of Belonging as seen during its inaugural exhibition at the Canadian Museum of Civilization in Gatineau (Ottawa). Photographer: Nick Wolochatiuk

The Quilt of Belonging is a collaborative textile arts project initiated by Canadian artist Esther Bryan.

The 120-foot (37 m) long by 10.5-foot (3.2 m) high (36 metres by 3.5 metres) tapestry includes 263 quilt blocks, and portrays the cultural legacies of Canada’s First Peoples and of every nation in the world, all of which are part of Canada’s social fabric.

== History ==
The Quilt of Belonging was an art-in-community project, created by volunteers from Victoria to Newfoundland to the Arctic Circle, each of whom were invited to contribute a quilt piece reflecting their cultural backgrounds. The work was completed between 1999 and 2005. The materials in the pieces range from sealskin to African mud-cloth, from embroidered silk to gossamer wings of butterflies.

The inaugural exhibition of the completed Quilt of Belonging and the launch of the Quilt of Belonging book took place April 1, 2005 at the Canadian Museum of Civilization in Gatineau (Ottawa). The quilt, which was designed as a traveling exhibit, then went on a five-year tour across Canada, including communities in the arctic. It was the first art exhibit of its kind to tour in Inuit communities.

In 2017, as part of Canada's 150th birthday celebration, the Quilt of Belonging is making another tour across Canada, including a three week stop at the Canadian National Exhibition in August.

== Related reading ==
- Quilt of Belonging: The Invitation Project, by Esther Bryan and Friends, Boston Mills Press.
- The Quilt of Belonging, Stitching Together the Stories of a Nation, by Janice Weaver, Maple Tree Press.
- Coming to Canada, Building a Life in a New Land, by Susan Hughes, Maple Tree Press.
