= The Dinner Party =

Installation artwork by feminist artist Judy Chicago

- Artist: Judy Chicago
- Year: 1979
- Type: Mixed media
- Location: Brooklyn Museum, Brooklyn, New York
- Owner: Brooklyn Museum

The Dinner Party is an installation artwork by American feminist artist Judy Chicago. There are 39 elaborate place settings on a triangular table for 39 mythical and historical famous women. Kali, Judith, Sacajawea, Virginia Woolf, Susan B. Anthony, and Georgia O'Keeffe are among the symbolic guests.

Each place setting includes a hand-painted china plate, ceramic cutlery and chalice, and a napkin with an embroidered gold edge. Each plate, except the ones corresponding to Sojourner Truth and Ethel Smyth, depicts a brightly colored, elaborately styled vulvar form. The settings rest on intricately embroidered runners, executed in a variety of needlework styles and techniques. The table stands on The Heritage Floor, made up of more than 2,000 white luster-glazed triangular tiles, each inscribed in gold scripts with the name of one of 998 women and one man who have made a mark on history. (The man, Kresilas, was included by mistake, as he was thought to have been a woman called Cresilla.)

The Dinner Party was produced from 1974 to 1979 as a collaboration and first exhibited in 1979. Despite art world resistance, it toured to 16 venues in six countries on three continents to a viewing audience of 15 million. It was retired to storage from 1988 until 1996, as it was beginning to suffer from constant traveling. In 2007, it became a permanent exhibit in the Elizabeth A. Sackler Center for Feminist Art at the Brooklyn Museum, New York.

== About the work ==
The Dinner Party at the Brooklyn Museum

The Dinner Party was created by artist Judy Chicago, with the assistance of numerous volunteers, with the goal to "end the ongoing cycle of omission in which women were written out of the historical record." According to the artist, “The Dinner Party suggests that women have the capacity to be prime symbol-makers, to remake the world in our own image and likeness” (SNYDER, 1981, p. 31).

The table is triangular and measures 48 feet (14.63 m) on each side. There are 13 place settings on each of the table's sides, making 39 in all. Wing I honors women from Prehistory to the Roman Empire, Wing II honors women from the beginnings of Christianity to the Reformation and Wing III from the American Revolution to feminism.

Each place setting features a table runner embroidered with the woman's name and images or symbols relating to her accomplishments, with a napkin, utensils, a glass or goblet, and a plate. Many of the plates feature a butterfly- or flower-like sculpture representing a vulva. A cooperative effort of female and male artisans, The Dinner Party celebrates traditional female accomplishments such as textile arts (weaving, embroidery, sewing) and china painting, which have been framed as craft or domestic art, as opposed to the more culturally valued, male-dominated fine arts.

While the piece is composed of typical craftwork such as needlepoint and china painting and normally considered low art, "Chicago made it clear that she wants The Dinner Party to be viewed as high art, that she still subscribes to this structure of value: 'I'm not willing to say a painting and a pot are the same thing,' she has stated. 'It has to do with intent. I want to make art.'"

The white floor of triangular porcelain tiles, called the Heritage Floor, is inscribed with the names of a further 998 notable women (and one man, Kresilas, an ancient Greek sculptor, mistakenly included as he was thought to have been a woman called Cresilla), each associated with one of the place settings.

In 2002, the Elizabeth A. Sackler Foundation purchased and donated The Dinner Party to the Brooklyn Museum, where it lives in the Elizabeth A. Sackler Center for Feminist Art, which opened in March 2007.

In 2018, Chicago created a limited edition set of functional plates based on the Dinner Party designs. The designs that were reproduced were Elizabeth I, Primordial Goddess, Amazon, and Sappho.

== Design details ==
The Dinner Party took six years and $250,000 to complete, not including volunteer labor. It began modestly as Twenty-Five Women Who Were Eaten Alive, a way in which Chicago could use her "butterfly-vagina" imagery and interest in china painting in a high-art setting. She soon expanded it to include 39 women arranged in three groups of 13. The triangular shape has long been a feminine symbol. The table is an equilateral triangle, to represent equality. The number 13 represents the number of people who were present at the Last Supper, an important comparison for Chicago, as the only people there were men. She developed the work on her own for the first three years before bringing in others. Over the next three years, over 400 people contributed to the work, most of them volunteers. About 125 were called "members of the project", suggesting long-term efforts, and a small group was closely involved with the project for the final three years, including ceramicists, needle-workers, and researchers. The project was organized according to what has been called "benevolent hierarchy" and "non-hierarchical leadership", as Chicago designed most aspects of the work and had the final control over decisions made.

The 39 plates start flat and begin to emerge in higher relief toward the end of the chronology, meant to represent modern woman's increasing independence and equality. The work also uses supplementary written information such as banners, timelines, and a three-book exhibition publication to provide background information on each woman and the process of making the work.

== Women represented in the place settings ==
The first wing of the triangular table has place settings for female figures from the goddesses of prehistory through to Hypatia at the time of the Roman Empire. This section covers the emergence and decline of the Classical world.

The second wing begins with Marcella and covers the rise of Christianity. It concludes with Anna van Schurman in the seventeenth century at the time of the Restoration.

The third wing represents the Age of Revolution. It begins with Anne Hutchinson and moves through the twentieth century to the final places paying tribute to Virginia Woolf and Georgia O'Keeffe.

The 39 women with places at the table are:

Wing I: From Prehistory to the Roman Empire
1. Primordial Goddess
2. Fertile Goddess
3. Ishtar
4. Kali
5. Snake Goddess
6. Sophia
7. Amazon
8. Hatshepsut
9. Judith
10. Sappho
11. Aspasia
12. Boadicea
13. Hypatia

Wing II: From the Beginnings of Christianity to the Reformation
14. Marcella
15. Saint Bridget
16. Theodora
17. Hrosvitha
18. Trota of Salerno
19. Eleanor of Aquitaine
20. Hildegarde of Bingen
21. Petronilla de Meath
22. Christine de Pisan
23. Isabella d'Este
24. Elizabeth I
25. Artemisia Gentileschi
26. Anna van Schurman

Wing III: From the American to the Women's Revolution
27. Anne Hutchinson
28. Sacajawea
29. Caroline Herschel
30. Mary Wollstonecraft
31. Sojourner Truth
32. Susan B. Anthony
33. Elizabeth Blackwell
34. Emily Dickinson
35. Ethel Smyth
36. Margaret Sanger
37. Natalie Barney
38. Virginia Woolf
39. Georgia O'Keeffe

=== Women represented in the Heritage Floor ===
The Heritage Floor, which sits underneath the table, features the names of 998 women (and one man, Kresilas, mistakenly included as he was thought to have been a woman called Cresilla) inscribed on white handmade porcelain floor tilings. The tilings cover the full extent of the triangular table area, from the footings at each place setting, continues under the tables themselves and fills the full enclosed area within the three tables. There are 2,304 tiles with names spread across more than one tile. The names are written in the Palmer cursive script, a twentieth-century American form. Chicago states that the criteria for a woman's name being included in the floor were one or more of the following:

1. She had made a worthwhile contribution to society
2. She had tried to improve the lot of other women
3. Her life and work had illuminated significant aspects of women's history
4. She had provided a role model for a more egalitarian future.

Accompanying the installation are a series of wall panels that explain the role of each woman on the floor and associate her with one of the place settings.

== Response ==
In a 1981 interview, Chicago said that the backlash of threats and hateful castigation in reaction to the work brought on the only period of suicide risk she had ever experienced in her life, characterizing herself as "like a wounded animal". She said that she sought refuge from public attention by moving to a small rural community and that friends and acquaintances took on administrative support roles for her, such as opening her mail, while she threw herself into working on Embroidering Our Heritage, the 1980 book documenting the project.

=== Immediate critical response (1980–1981) ===
The Dinner Party prompted many varied opinions. Feminist critic Lucy Lippard stated, "My own initial experience was strongly emotional... The longer I spent with the piece, the more I became addicted to its intricate detail and hidden meanings", and defended the work as an excellent example of the feminist effort. These reactions are echoed by other critics, and the work was glorified by many.

Just as adamant, however, were the immediate criticisms of the work. Hilton Kramer, for example, argued, "The Dinner Party reiterates its theme with an insistence and vulgarity more appropriate, perhaps, to an advertising campaign than to a work of art". He called the work not only a kitsch object but also "crass and solemn and singleminded", "very bad art,... failed art,... art so mired in the pieties of a cause that it quite fails to acquire any independent artistic life of its own".

Maureen Mullarkey also criticized the work, calling it preachy and untrue to the women it claims to represent. She especially disagreed with the sentiment that she labels "turn 'em upside down and they all look alike", an essentializing of all women that does not respect the feminist cause. Mullarkey also called the hierarchical aspect of the work into question, claiming that Chicago took advantage of her female volunteers.

Mullarkey focused on several particular plates in her critique of the work, specifically Emily Dickinson, Virginia Woolf, and Georgia O'Keeffe, using these women as examples of why Chicago's work was disrespectful to the women it depicts. She states that Dickinson's "multi-tiered pink lace crotch" was opposite the woman that it was meant to symbolize because of Dickinson's extreme privacy. Woolf's inclusion ignores her frustration at the public's curiosity about the sex of writers, and O'Keeffe had similar thoughts, denying that her work had any sexed or sexual meaning.

The Dinner Party was satirized by artist Maria Manhattan, whose counter-exhibit The Box Lunch at a SoHo gallery was billed as "a major art event honoring 39 women of dubious distinction", and ran in November and December 1980.

In response to The Dinner Party being a collaborative work, Amelia Jones makes note that "Chicago never made exorbitant claims for the 'collaborative' or nonhierarchical nature of the project. She has insisted that it was never conceived or presented as a 'collaborative' project as this notion is generally understood ... The Dinner Party project, she insisted throughout, was cooperative, not collaborative, in the sense that it involved a clear hierarchy but cooperative effort to ensure its successful completion."

New York Times art reviewer Roberta Smith declares that all of the details are not equal. She believes that "the runners tend to be livelier and more varied than the plates. In addition, the runners grow strong as the work progresses, while the plates become weaker, more monotonous and more overdone, which means the middle two-thirds of the piece is more successful." With the runners becoming more detailed as the work progresses, Smith notes that the backs of the runners are difficult to see and they "may be the best and boldest parts of all." Similarly, Smith stated that "its historical import and social significance may be greater than its aesthetic value".

Regarding the place settings, Janet Koplos believes that the plates are meant to serve as canvases, and the goblets offer vertical punctuation. She feels, however, that the "standardized flatware is historically incorrect early on and culturally skewed. The settings would be stronger as plates and runners alone."

=== Race and identity ===
In a 1984 article, Hortense J. Spillers critiqued Judy Chicago and The Dinner Party, asserting that, as a white woman, Chicago recreates the erasure of the black feminine sexual self. Spillers calls to her defense the place setting of Sojourner Truth, the only black woman. After thorough review, it can be seen that all of the place settings depict uniquely designed vaginas, except for Sojourner Truth. The place setting of Sojourner Truth is depicted by three faces, rather than a vagina. Spillers writes, "The excision of the female genitalia here is a symbolic castration. By effacing the genitals, Chicago not only abrogates the disturbing sexuality of her subject, but also hopes to suggest that her sexual being did not exist to be denied in the first place..." Much like Spillers's critique, Alice Walker published her critical essay in Ms. magazine noting "Chicago's ignorance of women of color in history (specifically black women painters), focusing in particular on The Dinner Party's representation of black female subjectivity in Sojourner Truth's plate. Walker states, "It occurred to me that perhaps white women feminists, no less than white women generally, can not imagine black women have vaginas. Or if they can, where imagination leads them is too far to go."

Esther Allen further criticizes Chicago in her article "Returning the Gaze, with a Vengeance". Allen claims that The Dinner Party excludes women from Spain, Portugal, or any of these empires' former colonies. This means that several very prominent women of Western history were excluded, such as Frida Kahlo, Teresa of Ávila, Gabriela Mistral, and more. Chicago herself responded to these criticisms, claiming that all of these women are included on the "Heritage Floor" and that focusing solely on who is at the table is "to over-simplify the art and ignore the criteria my studio team and I established and the limits we were working under". Further, Chicago states that, in the mid-1970s, there was little or no knowledge about any of these women.

=== Larger retrospective response ===
Critics such as Mullarkey have returned to The Dinner Party in later years and stated that their opinions have not changed. Many later responses to the work, however, have been more moderate or accepting, even if only by giving the work value based on its continued importance.

Amelia Jones, for example, places the work in the context of both art history and the evolution of feminist ideas to explain critical responses of the work. She discusses Hilton Kramer's objection to the piece as an extension of Modernist ideas about art, stating, "the piece blatantly subverts modernist value systems, which privilege the 'pure' aesthetic object over the debased sentimentality of the domestic and popular arts" . Jones also addresses some critics' argument that The Dinner Party is not high art because of its huge popularity and public appeal. Where Kramer saw the work's popularity as a sign that it was of a lesser quality, Lippard and Chicago herself thought that its capability of speaking to a larger audience should be considered a positive attribute.

The "butterfly vagina" imagery continues to be both highly criticized and esteemed. Many conservatives criticized the work for reasons summed up by Congressman Robert K. Dornan in his statement that it was "ceramic 3-D pornography", but some feminists also found the imagery problematic because of its essentializing, passive nature. However, the work fits into the feminist movement of the 1970s, which glorified and focused on the female body. Other feminists have disagreed with the main idea of this work because it shows a universal female experience, which many argue does not exist. For example, lesbians and women of ethnicities other than white and European are not well represented in the work.

Jones presents the argument regarding the collaborative nature of the project. Many critics attacked Chicago for claiming that the work was a collaboration when instead she was in control of the work. Chicago, however, had never claimed that the work would be this kind of ideal collaboration and always took full responsibility for the piece.

Artist Cornelia Parker nominated it as a work she would like to see "binned", saying, "Too many vaginas for my liking. I find it all about Judy Chicago's ego rather than the poor women she's supposed to be elevating – we're all reduced to vaginas, which is a bit depressing. It's almost like the biggest piece of victim art you've ever seen. And it takes up so much space! I quite like the idea of trying to fit it in some tiny bin – not a very feminist gesture but I don't think the piece is either."

== Controversy at the University of the District of Columbia ==
In 1990, The Dinner Party was considered for permanent housing at the University of the District of Columbia. It was part of a plan to bring in revenue for the school, as it had proved to be very successful. The work was to be donated as a gift to the school, and it was to join an expanding collection of African-American art, including a large group of paintings by Washington abstractionist Sam Gilliam and works by Elizabeth Catlett, Romare Bearden, Alma Thomas, Hale Woodruff, Jacob Lawrence and Lois Mailou Jones, among others. These – along with works by a group of local white Color Field painters and some white UDC faculty members also in the university collections – were to become the core of what was presented in early 1990 as a ground-breaking multicultural art center, a hopeful coalition between artists of color, feminists and other artists depicting the struggle for freedom and human equality.

Judy Chicago donated The Dinner Party with the understanding that one of the school's buildings would be repaired to house it. The money for these repairs had already been allocated and did not come from the school's working budget. On June 19, 1990, UDC trustees formally accepted the gift of The Dinner Party by unanimous vote. Soon, however, reporters from the right-wing Washington Times began writing stories that claimed that The Dinner Party "had been banned from several art galleries around the country because it depicts women's genitalia on plates" and that the "Board of Trustees will spend nearly $1.6 million to acquire and exhibit a piece of controversial art." Misunderstandings about the monetary situation were emphasized and perpetuated by media sources. Eventually, the plans were cancelled owing to concerns that the collection would negatively affect the school's working budget.

== Companion piece ==
The International Honor Quilt (also known as the International Quilting Bee) is a collective feminist art project initiated in 1980 by Judy Chicago as a companion piece to The Dinner Party.

== See also ==
- International Honor Quilt
- Famous Women Dinner Service
- Vagina and vulva in art

== Bibliography ==
- Chicago, Judy. The Dinner Party: From Creation to Preservation. London: Merrell (2007). ISBN 1-85894-370-1.
