= Ana Lupaș =

Romanian artist

- Born: 1940; Cluj, Romania

Ana Lupaș (born 1940, Cluj) is a Romanian installation artist, textile artist, and photographer. She studied at the Institute of Fine and Decorative Art in Cluj-Napoca. Her art is influenced by neo-avant-garde movements such as land art, post-minimalism and Arte Povera, as well as folklore and local practices. She uses materials such as wool, cotton, linen, not only to challenge artistic norms, but also out of necessity, as she faced harsh living conditions under the communist dictatorship of the time. She managed a hidden local artistic community and worked somewhat secretly, creating artworks as a form of silent resistance against the totalitarian regime of Nicolae Ceaușescu, during which many of her family members - part of the pre-war political and intellectual elite - were imprisoned, tortured and killed.

She refused to obey the rules of communist ideology, where individual expression was not allowed, and with constant censorship and monitoring from higher up. The nature of her work, non-figurative, visual and conceptual, made it hard to pinpoint, and thus allowed her to slip through the cracks of censorship. She worked in remote locations, away from the centers of power. Much of her work represents dehumanization under communist dictatorship, as well as resistance, individuality and the preservation of cultural heritage. She has intensive interaction with nature and the farming population, which were in danger under the large-scale modernization and destruction of the countryside under the regime.

She first exhibited her art in 1965 at the National Exhibition for Decorative Arts, Bucharest. In 2016 her work was exhibited at the Museion, Museo d'Arte Moderna e Contemporanea in Bolzano, Italy. The same year the Tate purchased her large scale work "The Solemn Process 1964–2008 (1964–74/76; 1980–5; 1985–2008)". Her work "Coats to Borrow (1989) was purchased in 2022 by the Stedelijk Museum in Amsterdam (curated by Leontine Coelewij), which hosted a temporary exhibition of her work in 2024, a collaborative project with the Kunstmuseum Liechtenstein. The two museums are working to develop a catalogue of her entire career.

As early as the 1960s, Lupaș became interested in the expressive power of textiles, and the relationship between object and body covering. Near the end of the decade, Lupaș began working on two specific pieces that would capture this idea. She began working on the series Identity Shirts in 1969. This series used "pieces of cloth...overwritten like palimpsests with the sewing machine, with pens, with ink, and even with blood." She is also well known for Humid Installation (1970), which affirmed her interest in depicting her native Romania's farming culture. She currently lives in Cluj-Napoca.

== Artworks and Installations ==
=== The Solemn Process (1964-2008) ===
The work took five decades to complete and was first shown in 2008 at Taxispalais in Innsbruck. The Solemn Process included mixed media of, straw, metal and photographs, and used local workers to help build and pose with some of the sculptures, which were eventually included in the art piece itself. As years went by, some sculptures had to be re-built into longer lasting materials. Lupaș wanted to mimic the harvesting process of Romania, as well as illustrating that art itself, can be an evolving process.

=== Humid Installation (1970) ===
Humid Installation consists of wet fabric hung above trenches in the Transylvanian countryside. The countryside was less subjected to the eyes of the regime, and thus Lupaș created the installation with the help of the locals. The artwork represents work as a collective experience of humankind.

The installation was meant to be ephemeral, but got immortalized by chance thanks to a passing photographer.

=== Coats to Borrow (1989) ===
The installation consists of handmade coats hanging or lying on orange-painted metal furniture. The coats were made with old clothes and textiles she handed to her artist group, Atelier 35, with members encourage to sew their names inside the coats. They became objects of networking and resistance under the communist rule.
