= Presidential Directive 59 =

US atomic weapons policy

Declassified text of PD-59, heavily redacted

Presidential Directive 59 (PD-59) was a top secret document titled "Nuclear Weapons Employment Policy" prepared by the Carter administration and dated 25 July 1980 that contained plans for carrying out an extended nuclear war.

Carter's National Security Advisor Zbigniew Brzezinski described it as an addition to National Security Decision Memorandum 242, a Nixon administration document that it superseded.

Parts of its contents were leaked shortly after its creation, causing a public furore about nuclear escalation.

A redacted version of PD-59 has since been declassified and released publicly.
