= National Virtual Translation Center =

The National Virtual Translation Center (NVTC) is a United States government organization established in February 2003 which provides "timely, accurate, and cost-effective translations for the U.S. Intelligence Community and other federal agencies."

Section 907 of the USA PATRIOT Act adopted in 2001 requested a report on the establishment of such a translation center. It was then formed by section 313 of the Intelligence Authorization Act for Fiscal Year 2003. The Federal Bureau of Investigation is the executive agency in charge of the organization.

NVTC's language-technology tools and linguists can accurately translate over 120 languages in text, audio, and visual formats. Its primary customers are intelligence and military organizations, for whom there is no fee. Other federal government organizations may arrange translation support services from NVTC with reimbursement.

== See also ==
- World News Connection
- Defense Language Office
