= Amy Zegart =

American academic (born 1967)

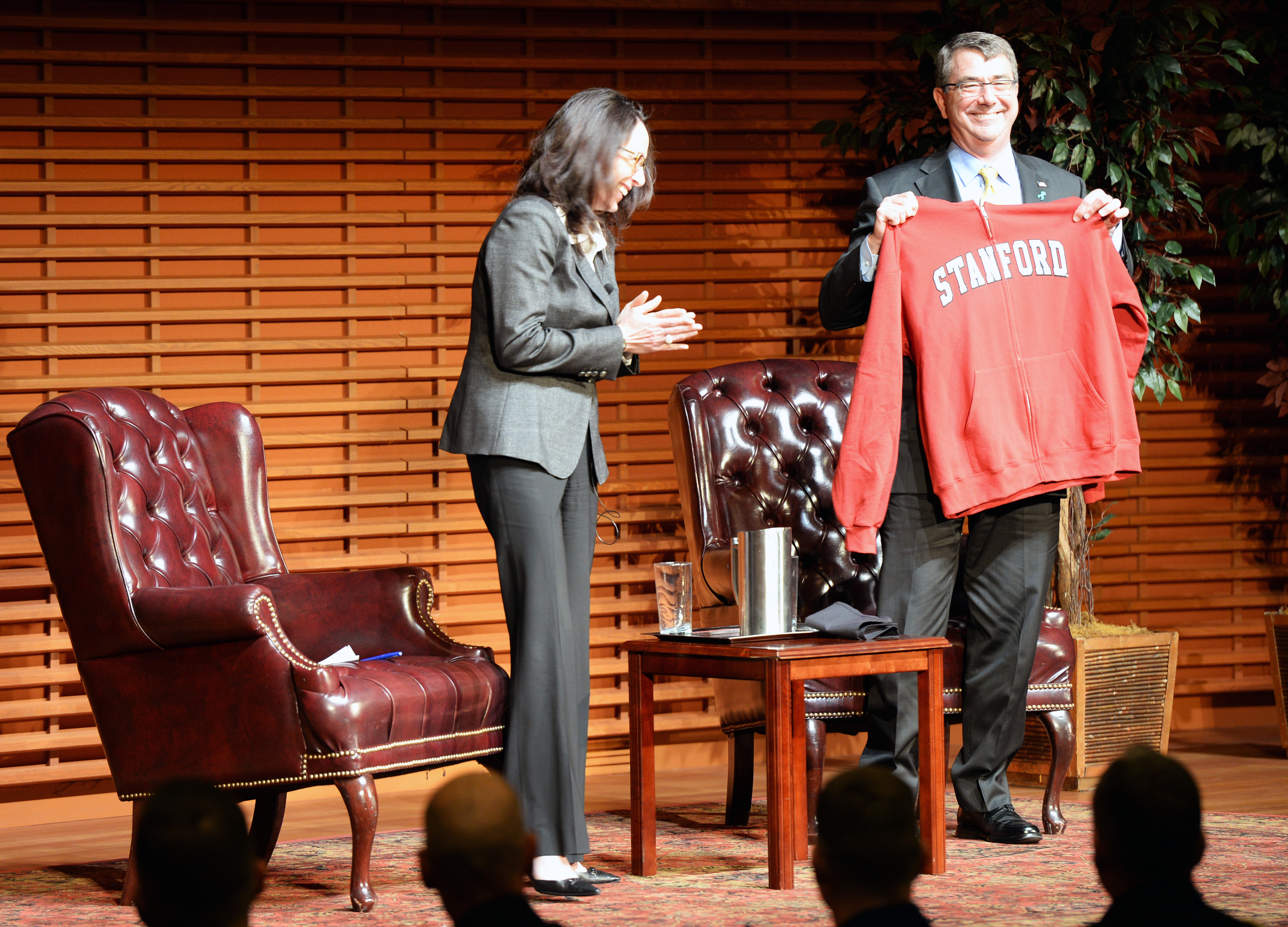
- Secretary of Defense Ash Carter receives a Stanford sweater from Dr. Amy Zegart at the Drell Lecture at Stanford University on April 23, 2015.
- Born: 1967 (age 58–59); Louisville, Kentucky, U.S.
- Occupation: Professor
- Board member of: Council on Foreign Relations; Kratos Defense & Security Solutions
- Parent: Shelly Zegart

Academic background
- Education: Harvard University (BA); Stanford University (PhD)
- Academic advisor: Condoleezza Rice

Academic work
- Discipline: Political scientist
- Sub-discipline: National security
- Institutions: Hoover Institution; Stanford University

Amy Zegart (born 1967) is an American political scientist currently serving as the Morris Arnold and Nona Jean Cox Senior Fellow at the Hoover Institution, a senior fellow at the Freeman Spogli Institute of International Studies (FSI), and professor of political science (by courtesy) at Stanford University. She is also a contributing writer to The Atlantic. From 2013 to 2018, she served as co-director of FSI's Center for International Security and Cooperation (CISAC) and founder and co-director of the Stanford Cyber Policy Program.

== Early life and education ==
Zegart was born in 1967 in Louisville, Kentucky, to Kenneth and Shelly Zegart. She received an A.B. in East Asian Studies magna cum laude from Harvard University then earned a Ph.D. in Political Science at Stanford University, where she studied under Condoleezza Rice. While in graduate school, she spent time on President Bill Clinton's National Security Council staff.

== Career ==
Shortly after graduating from Harvard, Zegart moved to Hong Kong, where she continued studying East Asia for a year on a Fulbright Scholarship. Following this, she began work as an associate with McKinsey & Company, where she advised Fortune 100 companies on strategy and organizational effectiveness. Zegart then attended graduate school. After completing her Ph.D., she served as a professor of public policy at the UCLA Luskin School of Public Affairs and a fellow at the Burkle Center for International Relations. In 2011, Zegart moved to Stanford University.

Zegart is a leading expert on the United States Intelligence Community and national security policy. She has written five books on the topic: Flawed By Design, which chronicled the evolution of the relationship between the United States Department of Defense, the Central Intelligence Agency, and the National Security Council; Spying Blind, which examined U.S. intelligence agencies in the period preceding the September 11 attacks in 2001; Eyes on Spies, which examined the weaknesses of U.S. intelligence oversight; and Spies, Lies, and Algorithms, which examined espionage in the digital age.

Zegart currently serves as a member of the board of directors of the Council on Foreign relations and Kratos Defense & Security Solutions, a military contractor and weapons manufacturer that received a $29m government contract in 2016 to produce directed-energy weapon systems.

== Personal life ==
Zegart currently resides in Palo Alto, California, and is married to a retired screenwriter.

== Publications ==
- Flawed by Design: The Evolution of the CIA, JCS, and NSC, Stanford University Press, 1999. ISBN 9780804735049
- Spying Blind: The CIA, the FBI, and the Origins of 9/11, Princeton University Press, 2007. ISBN 9780691120218
- Eyes on Spies: Congress and the United States Intelligence Community, Hoover Institution Press, 2011. ISBN 9780817912840
- Rice, Condoleezza; Zegart, Amy (2018). Political Risk: How Businesses and Organizations Can Anticipate Global Insecurity. New York City: Twelve. ISBN 9781455542352. OCLC 1019846069.
- "Spies, Lies, and Algorithms," Foreign Affairs, May/June 2019.
- Lin, Herbert; Zegart, Amy (2019). Bytes, Bombs, and Spies: The Strategic Dimensions of Offensive Cyber Operations. Washington: Brookings Institution Press. ISBN 9780815735472.
- "Intelligence Isn't Just for Governments Anymore," Foreign Affairs, November 2020.
- "Spies Like Us," Foreign Affairs, July/August 2021.
- Spies, Lies, and Algorithms: The History and Future of American Intelligence, Princeton University Press, 2022. ISBN 9780691147130
