= Aspin–Brown Commission =

American commission

The Aspin–Brown Commission, more properly known as the Commission on the Roles and Capabilities of the US Intelligence Community, was commissioned by the United States Congress after the National Security Act of 1992 failed to be passed. The Commission produced a report in 1996. In the year 2000, the U.S. Senator David L. Boren, Democrat of Oklahoma, wrote in the foreword to Robert D. Steele's book On Intelligence: Spies and Secrecy in an Open World that these reforms had not yet been implemented by any of the Directors of Central Intelligence who had an opportunity to do so. The commission was successively chaired by Les Aspin and Secretary of Defense Harold Brown.
