= Posthomerica =

Epic poem by Quintus of Smyrna

- by Quintus Smyrnaeus
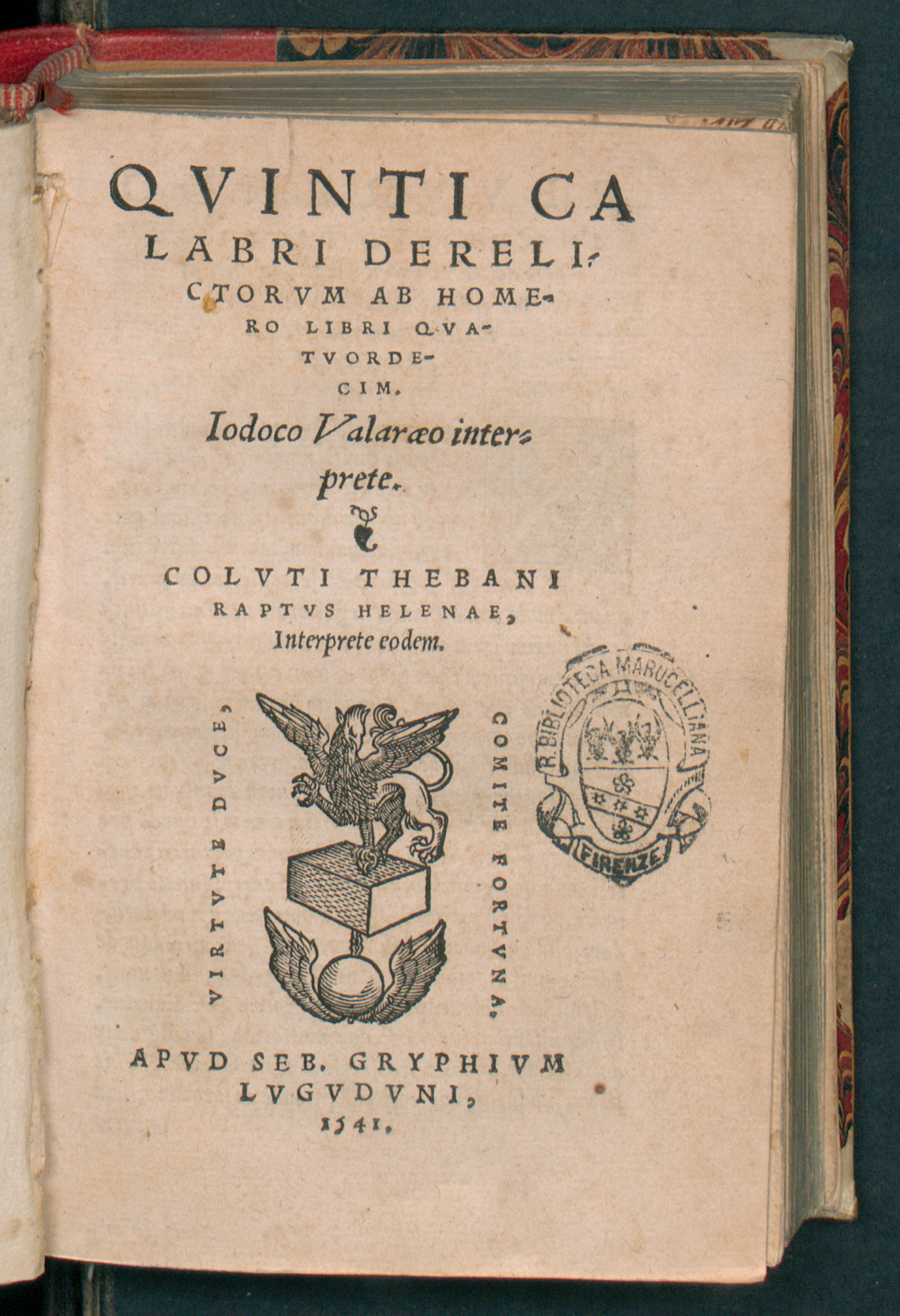
- Printed Latin translation of the Posthomerica, 1541
- Original title: τὰ μεθ’ Ὅμηρον
- Written: 3rd to 4th century AD
- Language: Ancient Greek
- Subject: Trojan War
- Genre: Epic poetry
- Meter: Dactylic hexameter

The Posthomerica (Ancient Greek: τὰ μεθ’ Ὅμηρον, romanized: tà meth’ Hómēron, lit. 'Things After Homer') is an epic poem in Greek hexameter verse by Quintus of Smyrna. Probably written in the 3rd century AD, it tells the story of the Trojan War, between the death of Hector and the fall of Ilium (Troy). The poem is an abridgement of the events described in the epic poems Aethiopis and Iliou Persis by Arctinus of Miletus, and the Little Iliad by Lesches, all now-lost poems of the Epic Cycle.

The first four books, covering the same ground as the Aethiopis, describe the doughty deeds and deaths of Penthesileia the Amazon, of Memnon, son of Eos, and of Achilles; and the funeral games in honour of Achilles. Books five through twelve, covering the same ground as the Little Iliad, span from the contest between Ajax and Odysseus for the arms of Achilles, the death of Ajax by suicide after his loss, the exploits of Neoptolemus, Eurypylus and Deiphobus, the deaths of Paris and Oenone, to the building of the wooden horse. The remaining books, covering the same ground as Iliou Persis, relate the capture of Troy by means of the wooden horse, the sacrifice of Polyxena at the grave of Achilles, the departure of the Greeks, and their dispersal by the storm.

== Summary ==
=== Book 1 ===
Quintus dispenses with the customary invocation of the Muses in order to make his first line continue from the end of the Iliad. Book 1 tells of the arrival of the proud Amazon queen Penthesileia, (Note: Featured in the Aethiopis.) the daughter of Ares, who comes from the Thermodon River with a group of Amazon warriors after accidentally killing her sister while aiming at a stag. She has come to share the hardships of war and to escape her people. The welcome she receives from the hard-pressed Trojans includes Priam's hope that she will save Troy and kill Achilles, although Andromache doubts that she is capable of doing so. Priam prays to Zeus that Penthesileia may return safely, but an eagle carrying a dove appears as an omen foretelling her death. Penthesileia enjoys initial successes in battle, killing Podarces, but is defeated by Achilles, who kills her by impaling her and her horse. Achilles is struck by her beauty and regrets that he did not make her his wife. He then kills Thersites for mocking his admiration of the beautiful victim. The book closes with burial of the dead.

=== Book 2 ===
The Trojans debate their situation. Thymoetes is despondent, Priam encouraging. The wise Polydamas' suggestion that Helen should be given back meets with an angry response from Paris. The rest of the book is similar in plan to Book 1. Trojan hopes are raised by the arrival of Priam's nephew Memnon, (Note: Featured in the Aethiopis, in Sophocles' Memnon or Aithiopes, and in Aeschylus' Memnon and The Weighing of Souls.) son of Dawn, and his Ethiopian troops. Like Penthesileia, he is royally entertained, enjoys initial success in the battle, and is defeated by Achilles. Memnon kills Nestor's son Antilochus before Achilles kills him. His divine mother, the Dawn, has his body carried away by the winds and metamorphoses his troops into birds. (Note: Not mentioned in Proclus' summary of the Aethiopis. Quintus' account thereof is close to that given by Dionysius in his didactic poem on fowling, Ixeutica, a summary of which survives; cf. Ovid's Metamorphoses (13.576–622).) In her grief Dawn refuses to let the sun rise and retreats to Hades until Zeus persuades her to return. The book closes with mourning, both divine and human.

=== Book 3 ===
Apollo warns Achilles to stop the slaughter and, when he defiantly continues, shoots him in the ankle with an arrow. The wound will eventually prove fatal. The Trojans are initially afraid to confront the injured Achilles, but after his death there is a desperate struggle over his body, in which Ajax, son of Telamon, takes the lead on the Greek side. Ajax kills Glaucos, who falls on top of Achilles, and also injures Aeneas, while Odysseus helps him defend the body. Ajax stuns Paris with a rock, forcing him to abandon his attempt to take Achilles' corpse. The Trojans fall back and the body is recovered. Book 3, like Books 1 and 2, ends with mourning. Achilles is lamented by Phoenix, Briseis, the Nereids, and his mother (Thetis), and the preparations for his funeral (Note: Featured in the Aethiopis. Quintus' account recalls the funeral of Patroclus in Book 23 of the Iliad, and alludes to the description of Achilles' funeral in the Odyssey (24.43–84).) are described. Calliope tells Thetis that Achilles will always be remembered, while Poseidon consoles Thetis with an assurance that Achilles will join the gods and receive special worship.

=== Book 4 ===
The gods react variously to Achilles' death, and the Greeks prepare to resume hostilities. But Thetis wishes to hold funeral games in honor of her son, and in the remainder of the book these competitions are described. They involve all-in wrestling, the long jump, and horse riding, all of which featured in the games of the Roman imperial period; and Nestor's verse encomium of Achilles probably reflects the artistic contests commonly included in games in Quintus' time.

=== Book 5 ===
Achilles' armor is displayed by Thetis, and there is a long description of the shield. (Note: Described by Homer in Book 18 of the Iliad. Quintus alludes to some of the Homeric scenes but shows considerable independence, incorporating more of the horrors of war and including an allegorical scene, the lofty Mount of Virtue. The effect is disconcerting: Quintus and Homer cannot both be right; lines 97–98 hardly remedy this problem.) She offers the armor as a reward for the man who recovered Achilles' body. Ajax (son of Telamon) and Odysseus claim the prize, and the invidious decision between them is left to Trojan prisoners of war. After hearing the speeches, they award the armor to Odysseus. (Note: By Quintus' time, countless rhetoricians and poets had composed speeches for Ajax and Odysseus.) Quintus has narrated the fighting (Note: The contest and its denouement were described in the Aethiopis and Little Iliad. The fullest surviving version of the episode is in Book 13 of Ovid's Metamorphoses, where, unsurprisingly, several similar arguments are deployed.) in Book 4 so as to show that this is the wrong decision. Ajax, raging with disappointment, plans to slaughter the Greeks during the night, but Athena diverts his fury against a flock of sheep. Once his madness leaves him, he feels humiliated and kills himself. (Note: The Aethiopis omits the story of Ajax' madness. Quintus' account owes some details to Sophocles' Ajax.) He is lamented by his half-brother Teucer and his concubine Tecmessa. Odysseus tries to conciliate the army with a patently insincere speech. The book closes with Ajax' funeral, which recalls that of Achilles at the end of Book 3. Four of the first five books have ended in lamentation, and each side has lost two champions.

=== Book 6 ===
Menelaus tests the Greeks' resolve by proposing retreat, (Note: The testing of troops is inspired by a similar episode in Book 2 of the Iliad, the battle scenes by parts of Book 11.) but Diomedes threatens to kill anyone who tries to leave before Troy is taken. In response to advice from the seer Calchas that this will not happen unless Achilles' son Neoptolemus (Note: Mentioned in both the Iliad (19.327–33) and the Odyssey (11.505–37).) is present, Odysseus and Diomedes set sail for Scyros to fetch him. (Note: Their embassy to Scyros was recounted in the Little Iliad. Sophocles and Euripides wrote plays entitled Men of Scyros, now lost, treating the same episode.) Eurypylus, (Note: Featured in the Little Iliad and in a homonymous tragedy of Sophocles, now lost.) leader of the Cetaeans, comes with his army to the aid of the Trojans. He is the grandson of Heracles and the son of Telephus, who once fought Achilles. Like Penthesileia in Book 1 and Memnon in Book 2, he is royally received. There is a long description of his shield, which depicts the Labours of Heracles; this complements the description of Achilles' shield in Book 5. The second half of the book tells of various encounters in battle between the Greeks and the Trojans, with Eurypylus leading the Trojan attack and killing many Argive soldiers.

=== Book 7 ===
Some of the Greeks hold funerals for Nireus and Machaon, victims of Eurypylus. Machaon's grief-stricken brother Podalirius is offered consolation by Nestor. The Greek forces are driven back to their wall by Eurypylus. A truce allows burial of the dead. Meanwhile Odysseus and Diomedes find Neoptolemus eager to join the war, in spite of the pleading of his mother, Deidamia. (Note: Her tearful farewells are inspired by the scene between Jason and his mother, Alcimede, in Book 1 of Apollonius' Argonautica.) They return to Troy just in time to rescue the Greek cause. Neoptolemus is given his father's armor, and he rushes into battle. The book closes with his formal welcome from Phoenix and the Greek commanders. Both sides are now confident of success.

=== Book 8 ===
Eurypylus and Neoptolemus lead out their forces, and each is successful in the battle. Eventually they meet, exchange proud words, and fight. Eurypylus is slain. (Note: His killing was narrated in the Little Iliad and mentioned in the Odyssey (11.519–21).) Neoptolemus runs riot, killing so many Trojans that Quintus expresses surprise at his body count. Ares rallies the Trojans but is warned by Zeus not to fight Neoptolemus. (Note: The second half of the book is inspired by the interventions of Ares and Athena in Book 5 of the Iliad.) Apollo encourages the Trojans, and fierce fighting ensues. Just as the Greeks seem about to break into the city, Ganymede begs Zeus not to let him see Troy's destruction. Zeus hides the city in cloud, and Nestor warns the Greeks not to incur divine anger. They stop fighting, bury their dead, and honor the exploits of Neoptolemus. Both sides keep watch through the night.

=== Book 9 ===
The Trojans bury Eurypylus, and Neoptolemus prays at the tomb of his father, Achilles. Deïphobus encourages the fearful Trojans to fight, and both he and Neoptolemus slay countless victims. Finally they meet, but Deïphobus is removed from the battlefield by Apollo. Poseidon supports the Greeks and warns Apollo not to kill Neoptolemus. Calchas reveals that Troy may not be captured without the help of Philoctetes. Odysseus and Diomedes go to fetch him from the island of Lemnos. (Note: Their embassy was told in the Little Iliad. Sophocles' tragedy Philoctetes will have been known to Quintus. Euripides wrote a play, now lost, on the same subject.) They find him living in a cave and still suffering from the putrid wound whose stench had caused the Greeks to abandon him. (Note: Philoctetes and his wound are mentioned in the Iliad (2.721–25).) Although Philoctetes considers Odysseus responsible for leaving him behind, he forgives him and is persuaded to accompany them to Troy, where he is cured by Podalirius, honored, and offered compensation.

=== Book 10 ===
In an opening similar to that of Book 2, the wise Polydamas advises the Trojans to fight defensively from their walls, but Aeneas is for continuing the battle. (Note: The opening debate recalls that between Polydamas and Hector in Book 18 of the Iliad.) Intense fighting ensues. Philoctetes, whose baldric is described at length, shoots many victims with the bow of Heracles and eventually wounds Paris with a poisoned arrow. (Note: In the Little Iliad, Paris was killed by Philoctetes in the battle itself.) Paris, mortally wounded, seeks help from Oenone, (Note: Her story had been familiar at least since the Hellenistic period.) the wife whom he deserted in favor of Helen. She rejects his plea with scorn. Hera and the Seasons discuss what will happen after his death. Hecuba and Helen lament him, and the remorseful Oenone leaps on his funeral pyre. Paris and Oenone are buried next to one another, with their headstones facing in opposite directions.

=== Book 11 ===
The first part of the book tells of the battle on the plain. Aeneas and Eurymachus are urged on by Apollo. The Trojans are driven back by Neoptolemus and his Myrmidons, but Aeneas rallies them. A dust storm settles over the battle. When Athena intervenes on the Greek side, Aphrodite removes Aeneas from the battlefield, (Note: The removal of Aeneas from the fighting is based on the Iliad (5.311–17, 445–46), and several other scenes are inspired more generally by Books 5 and 13.) and the Trojans retreat within their walls. The second part of the book describes the Greeks' assault on the city on the following day. (Note: The narrative of the siege shares common elements with the messenger's speech in Euripides' Phoenician Women (1090–1199) and Virgil's account of the attack on the Trojan camp in the Aeneid (9.503–89).) The Greeks approach the gates under their shields, led by Odysseus, while Ares gives Aeneas the strength to retaliate by throwing huge rocks. Philoctetes shoots at Aeneas, but his shield protects him and the arrow strikes Mimas instead. The result is an impasse.

=== Book 12 ===
Prompted by an omen of a hawk and dove, the seer Calchas advises the Greeks to resort to trickery. Odysseus suggests a wooden horse. (Note: The story of the wooden horse was told in the Little Iliad and The Sack of Troy, and is recounted in the Odyssey (8.492–520; cf. 4.271–89, 11.523–32).) Neoptolemus and Philoctetes wish to continue fighting, but an omen from Zeus guarantees the plan. Epeius is inspired by Athena to construct the horse. A fight between the gods on opposing sides in the war is quelled by Zeus. (Note: The battle between the gods is inspired by the Theomachy in Book 20 of the Iliad.) Sinon (Note: Sophocles wrote plays entitled Sinon and Laocoön, now lost, and many other authors treated the subject. The best-known extant account is that in Virgil's Aeneid (2.13–249), where the narrator is Aeneas.) volunteers to stand by the horse and persuade the Trojans to take it inside their city. The rest of the Greeks, with Nestor and Agamemnon, sail away to Tenedos, leaving Sinon as a heavily disfigured messenger. Quintus invokes the Muses to help him list those who entered the horse; among them are Neoptolemus, Menelaüs, Odysseus, Sthenelus, Diomedes, and Philoctetes. When questioned by the Trojans, Sinon maintains his story that the horse is a tribute to Athena Tritogeneia. The priest Laocoön urges them to burn the horse, but his sudden blinding by Athena persuades them that they should ignore his advice and drag it into Troy. Two serpents emerge from the sea and devour Laocoön and his sons. Troy is filled with sinister omens: sacrifices refuse to catch fire, statues weep, and the temples are stained with blood. Cassandra warns the Trojans of their danger, but they prevent her from attacking the horse and begin their final carouse.

=== Book 13 ===
As the Trojans sleep, Sinon summons the Greeks. The slaughter begins. Ilioneus vainly begs Diomedes for his life, but Priam is eager to be killed when confronted by Neoptolemus. Hector's young son Astyanax is murdered; his mother, Andromache, begs for death but is taken into slavery. Antenor is spared as reward for past hospitality. Calchas warns the Greeks not to harm Aeneas, who is destined to found a new city. Menelaüs kills Helen's new husband, Deïphobus, but Aphrodite prevents him from killing Helen. Locrian Ajax rapes Cassandra in the temple of Athena, incurring the goddess' wrath. The city is set ablaze. Aethra, Theseus' mother, unexpectedly meets her grandsons. Priam's daughter Laodice prays to be swallowed up by the earth. (Note: Most of these events were narrated in the Sack of Ilium. The best-known extant account is that in Virgil's Aeneid (2.250–804), where the narrator is Aeneas.)

=== Book 14 ===
The women of Troy are assigned to their new masters. Helen's beauty prevents the Greeks from blaming her. There are general celebrations, with bards singing of the war. Menelaüs forgives Helen. Achilles appears to Neoptolemus in a dream, gives him moral advice, and demands the sacrifice of Polyxena to appease his continuing anger over Briseïs. Her sacrifice, and the misery of her mother Hecuba, are described at length. Hecuba is metamorphosed into a dog made of stone. (Note: Polyxena's sacrifice and Hecuba's metamorphosis feature in Euripides' Hecuba and Ovid's Metamorphoses (13.429–575). Sophocles wrote a Polyxena, now lost.) The voyage gets under way, with very different emotions experienced by the Greeks and the captive women. Athena complains to Zeus of Locrian Ajax' sacrilege and is lent the weapons of storm. (Note: The storm scene has elements in common with that in Book 1 of the Aeneid (34–123). The storm and the assigning of the women are described in Euripides' Trojan Women (48–97, 235–92).) The ships are scattered. Ajax is defiant to the end. (Note: His death is mentioned in Book 4 of the Odyssey (499–511).) Many perish on the Capherean Rocks. Poseidon destroys all trace of the Greeks' walls at Troy. (Note: Their destruction is foretold in Book 12 of the Iliad (3–33).) The survivors come to land. (Note: Most of these events were treated in the Sack of Ilium and the Returns from Troy.) The Odyssey can begin.

== The major characters ==
- The Argives (Ἀργεĩοι):
  - Agamemnon — King of Mycenae; leader of the Greeks.
  - Achilles — Son of Thetis; champion of the Greeks.
  - Odysseus — King of Ithaca.
  - Ajax the Greater — son of Telamon, with Diomedes, he is second to Achilles in martial prowess.
  - Menelaus — King of Sparta; husband of Helen and brother of Agamemnon.
  - Diomedes — son of Tydeus, King of Argos.
  - Nestor — King of Pylos.
  - Ajax the Lesser — son of Oileus
  - Calchas — Seer
  - Neoptolemus — Son of Achilles
  - Philoctetes — Wielder of Heracles' bow
- Trojans:
  - Aeneas — son of Anchises and Aphrodite.
  - Alexander (Paris) — son of Priam and husband of Helen.
  - Priam — King of Troy.
  - Polydamas — Son of Priam; Strategist.
  - Deiphobus — Brother of Hector
  - Cassandra — Prophetess of Troy
  - Hecuba — Wife of Priam; Queen of the Trojans.
  - Andromache — Wife of Hector
- Trojan allies:
  - Penthesileia — Amazonian queen
  - Memnon — King of the Aithiopians
  - Eurypylus — Commander of the Mysians
- Major gods:
  - Zeus
  - Hera
  - Apollo
  - Aphrodite
  - Ares
  - Athena
  - Hermes
  - Poseidon
  - Hephaestus
- Minor gods:
  - Eris
  - Iris
  - Thetis
  - Themis

== Relationship to previous epics ==
Its style has been criticized by many scholars as subpar to Homer, but it is valuable as the earliest surviving account of this period in the Trojan War. The Iliad ends with "Such was the funeral of Hector, tamer of horses"; later poets changed this to however it might fit their needs. Quintus used it as an opening line: "Such was the funeral of Hector. And now there came an Amazon..."

The purpose of the story seems to be to complete the Iliad and give the characters a sense of closure. Many of the characters who had hated an ally in prior works, such as Philoctetes to Odysseus in Sophocles' play, now easily overcome the anger to create harmony.

== Translations ==
- English
  - Verse translation by Arthur Way, published in 1913 under the title The Fall of Troy by Harvard University Press
  - Prose translation by Frederick M. Combellack, published in 1968 under the title The War at Troy: What Homer Didn't Tell by University of Oklahoma Press
  - Verse translation by Alan James, published in 2004 under the title The Trojan Epic: Posthomerica by Johns Hopkins University Press
  - Prose translation by Neil Hopkinson, published in 2018 by Harvard University Press
- French
  - Prose translation by René Tourlet, published in 1800 under the title Guerre de Troie depuis la mort d’Hector jusqu’à la ruine de cette ville by Chez Lesguilliez
  - Prose translation by E. A. Berthault, published in 1884 under the title Le Guerre de Troie, ou, La Fin de L'Iliade by Hachette Livre
  - Prose translations by Francis Vian, published in 1963, 1966 and 1969 under the titles La Suite d'Homère, Tome I, La Suite d'Homère, Tome II and La Suite d'Homère, Tome III by Les Belles Lettres
- German
  - Verse translation by C. F. Platz, published in 1857 under the title Quintus von Smyrna by Verlag der J. B. Metzler
  - Verse translation by J. J. C. Donner, published in 1866 under the title Die Fortsetzung der Ilias by Krais & Hoffmann
  - Prose translation by Ursula Gärtner, published in 2012 under the title Der Untergang Trojas by WBG Academic
- Italian
  - Verse translation by Emanuele Lelli, published in 2013 under the title Il Seguito dell'Iliade by Bompiani
- Spanish
  - Prose translation by Inés Calero Secall, published in 1991 under the title Posthoméricas by Ediciones Clásicas, S.A.
  - Prose translation by Francisco A. García Romero, published in 1997 under the title Posthoméricas by Akal
  - Prose translation by Mario Toledano Vargas, published in 2004 under the title Posthoméricas by Editorial Gredos

== Critical editions ==
- A. Zimmermann, Quinti Smyrnaei Posthomericorum libri XIV, Leipzig 1891 (reprinted Stuttgart 1969).
- F. Vian, La suite d'Homère. Texte établi et traduit par Francis Vian, I-III, Paris 1963–9.
- G. Pompella, Quinti Smyrnaei Posthomerica. Olms-Weidmann, Hildesheim & New York 2002.
- Alan James, Quintus of Smyrna, The Trojan War: Posthomerica, English translation, Johns Hopkins 2004.
- Neil Hopkinson, "Quintus Smyrnaeus, Posthomerica", Loeb edition, English translation, Harvard University Press 2018.
