= Quintus Smyrnaeus =

4th-century Greek poet

Quintus Smyrnaeus (also Quintus of Smyrna; Greek: Κόϊντος Σμυρναῖος, Kointos Smyrnaios) was a Greek epic poet whose Posthomerica, following "after Homer", continues the narration of the Trojan War. The dates of Quintus Smyrnaeus' life and poetry are disputed: by tradition, he is thought to have lived in the latter part of the 4th century AD, but earlier dates have also been proposed.

His epic in fourteen books, known as the Posthomerica, covers the period between the end of Homer's Iliad and the end of the Trojan War. Its primary importance is as the earliest surviving work to cover this period, the archaic works in the Epic Cycle, which he knew and drew upon, having been lost. His materials are borrowed from the cyclic poems from which Virgil (with whose works he was probably acquainted) also drew, in particular the Aethiopis (Coming of Memnon) and the Iliupersis (Destruction of Troy) of Arctinus of Miletus, and the Ilias Mikra (Little Iliad) of Lesches. His work is closely modeled on Homer.

== Life ==
The dates of Quintus's life are controversial, but they are traditionally placed in the latter part of the 4th century AD. Way suggests that "His date is approximately settled by two passages in the poem, viz. vi. 531 sqq., in which occurs an illustration drawn from the man-and-beast fights of the amphitheatre, which were suppressed by Theodosius I. (379–395 AD); and xiii. 335 sqq., which contains a prophecy, the special particularity of which, it is maintained by Koechly, limits its applicability to the middle of the fourth century AD."

Some scholars suggest an earlier date in the 3rd or even the 2nd century, arguing that his Posthomerica shows an influence from the "Second Sophistic", the school of Greek orators who flourished in the 1st and 2nd centuries. According to his own account (xii. 310), he began composing poetry in his early youth while tending sheep near Smyrna (present-day İzmir).

A Christian poet of the 4th century, Dorotheus, known for his Greek epic poem The Vision of Dorotheus, has been identified as the son of Quintus Smyrnaeus. At the end of the manuscript of his Vision, he identifies himself as "Dorotheus, son of Quintus the poet". This identification is supported by the facts that there is no other poet Quintus in this period and Dorotheus uses the same Homeric poetic structure as Quintus.

== The Posthomerica ==
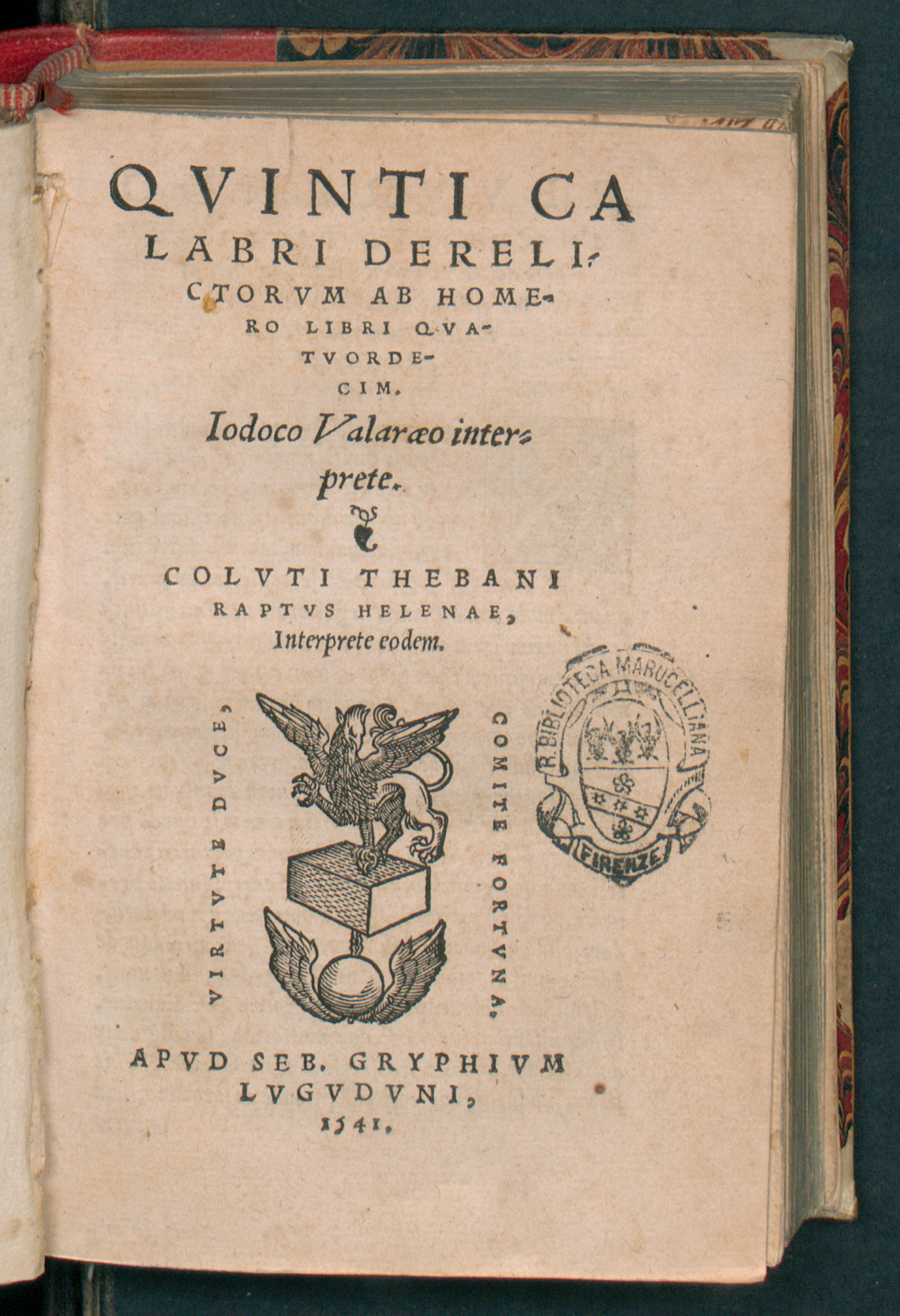
Posthomerica, 1541

The plot of Posthomerica begins where Homer's Iliad ends, immediately after Hector's body was regained by the Trojans. The first four books, covering the same ground as the Aethiopis of Arctinus of Miletus, describe the doughty deeds and deaths of the Amazon Penthesileia and of Aethiopian king Memnon, the son of the dawn goddess Eos, both slain by Achilles, and the death of Achilles himself and the funeral games in his honour.

Books five through twelve, covering the same ground as the Little Iliad of Lesches, span the contest between Aias and Odysseus for the arms of Achilles, the death of Aias of suicide after his loss, the exploits of Neoptolemus, Eurypylus and Deiphobus, the deaths of Paris and Oenone, and the building of the wooden horse. As well as drawing inspiration from Lesches' work, it is likely that these books gathered source material from Greek tragedy, such as Sophocles' depiction of Ajax.

The remaining books, covering the same ground as Arctinus' The Sack of Troy, relate the capture of Troy by means of the wooden horse, the sacrifice of Polyxena at the grave of Achilles, the departure of the Greeks, and their dispersal by storm.

== Editions ==
The editio princeps by Aldus Manutius was published at Venice, 1504 under the title Quinti Calabri derelictorum ab Homero libri XIV. Aldus calls him Quintus Calabrus, because the only known manuscript of his poem was discovered at Otranto in Calabria by Cardinal Bessarion, in 1450. His familiar name was first given him by his editor Lorenz Rhodomann, in 1577, who included a Latin translation by Michael Neander.

There has been a renewed interest in the poet and his poem in the twentieth century, with A. Way's translation (Loeb Classical Library vol. 19, 1913); a new edition of the text with partial commentary and French translation done by Francis Vian (3 vols. published by Budé, 1963, 1966, 1969); Frederick Combellack's English translation; Alan James and Kevin Lee's detailed commentary on book 5; and Alan James's English translation, with newly edited text and commentary.
