= Frederick M. Combellack =

- Born: May 30, 1906; Placerville, California, U.S.
- Died: February 27, 2002 (aged 95)
- Education: Stanford University; University of California
- Occupation: Classicist

Frederick Malcolm Combellack (May 30, 1906 – February 27, 2002) was an American classicist. He was a professor of Greek literature at the University of Oregon. He was a Guggenheim Fellow in 1942. He served on the board of directors of the American Philological Association in 1962, and he became its president in 1968. Combellack translated Quintus of Smyrna's epic poem the Posthomerica into prose English. It was published in 1968 under the name The War at Troy: What Homer Didn't Tell, and includes an introduction and notes written by Combellack.
