= Elasippus =

The name Elasippus may refer to:

- Elasippus, in Greek mythology, one of the Achaean soldiers killed by Penthesilea (Quintus Smyrnaeus, Fall of Troy, 1. 229)
- Elasippus, in Plato's myth of Atlantis, one of the ten sons of Poseidon and Cleito
- Elasippus, encaustic painter mentioned by Pliny the Elder (Naturals Historia 25. 122)
