= Aithiopes =

The Aithiopes is a tragedy by the 5th century BCE Athenian playwright Sophocles that survives only in fragments.

== Content ==
Jebb et al. believe that the Aithiopes by Sophocles ought to be identified with his play the Memnon. Lloyd-Jones says that the plot, though almost entirely unknown, is probably based on the story of the Ethiopian prince Memnon who was killed by Achilles, after having himself killed Nestor's son Antilochus in the Trojan War, which was described in the “lost post-Homeric epic Aethiopis”

== Date ==
Unfortunately, no date more precise than the 5th century BC can as yet be reliably ascribed to the writing or production of the play.

== Extant Sources ==
There are a number of sources for the play listed by Jebb and Lloyd-Jones; these include, among others Athenaeus, Deiphosophists 3, 122B, Photius Galeanus Lex. p. 22, and Photius 808 Theodoridis
