= Penthesilea =

Amazonian queen in Greek mythology

- Member of the Amazons
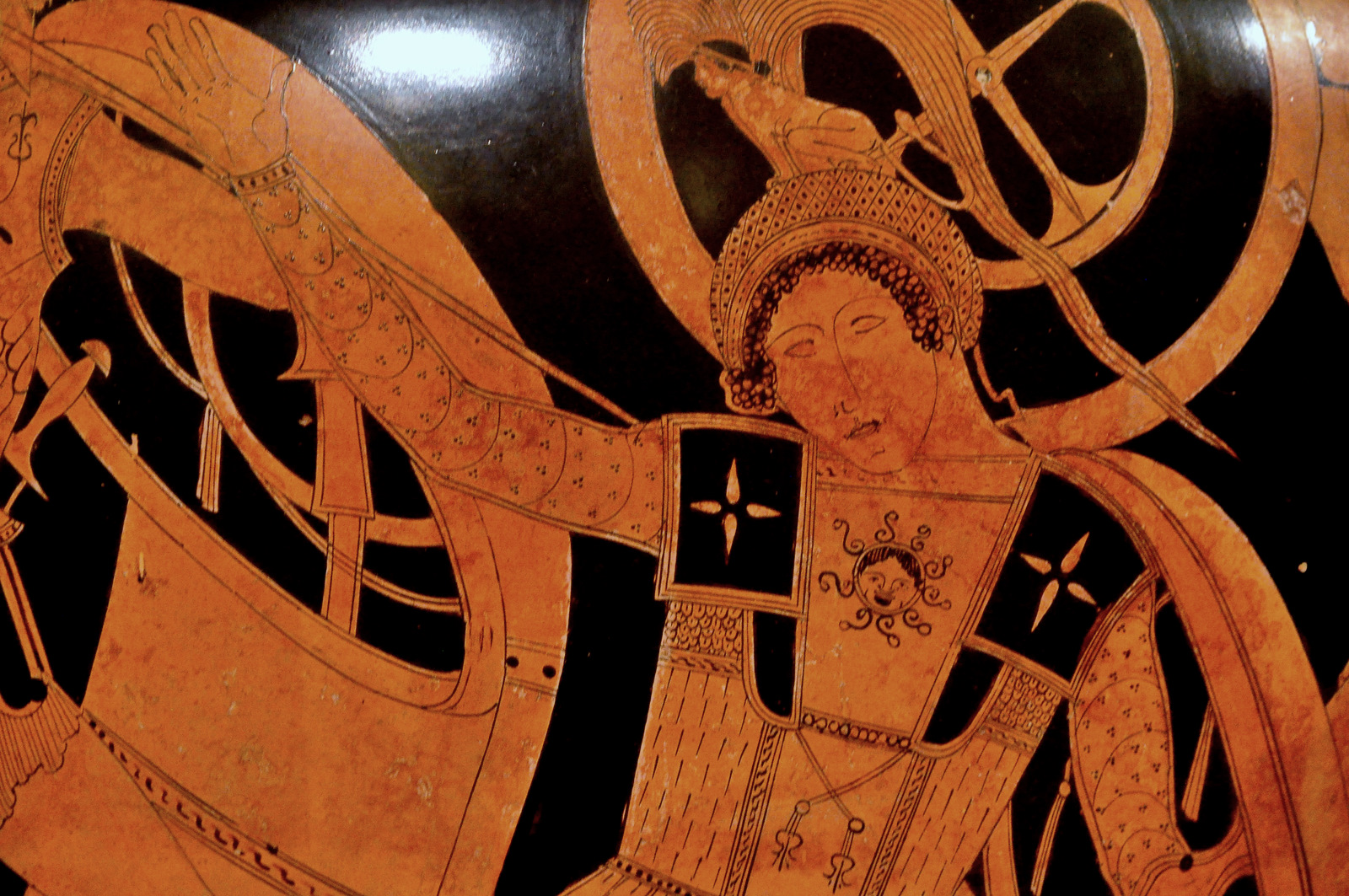
- Ancient Greek depiction of Penthesilea

Genealogy
- Parents: Ares and Otrera
- Siblings: Hippolyta, Antiope, Melanippe

Penthesilea (Ancient Greek: Πενθεσίλεια, romanized: Penthesíleia) was an Amazonian queen in Greek mythology, the daughter of Ares and Otrera and the sister of Hippolyta, Antiope, and Melanippe. She assisted Troy in the Trojan War, during which she was killed by Achilles or Neoptolemus. The asteroid 271 Penthesilea, discovered in 1887, was named in her honor.

== In the Epic Cycle ==
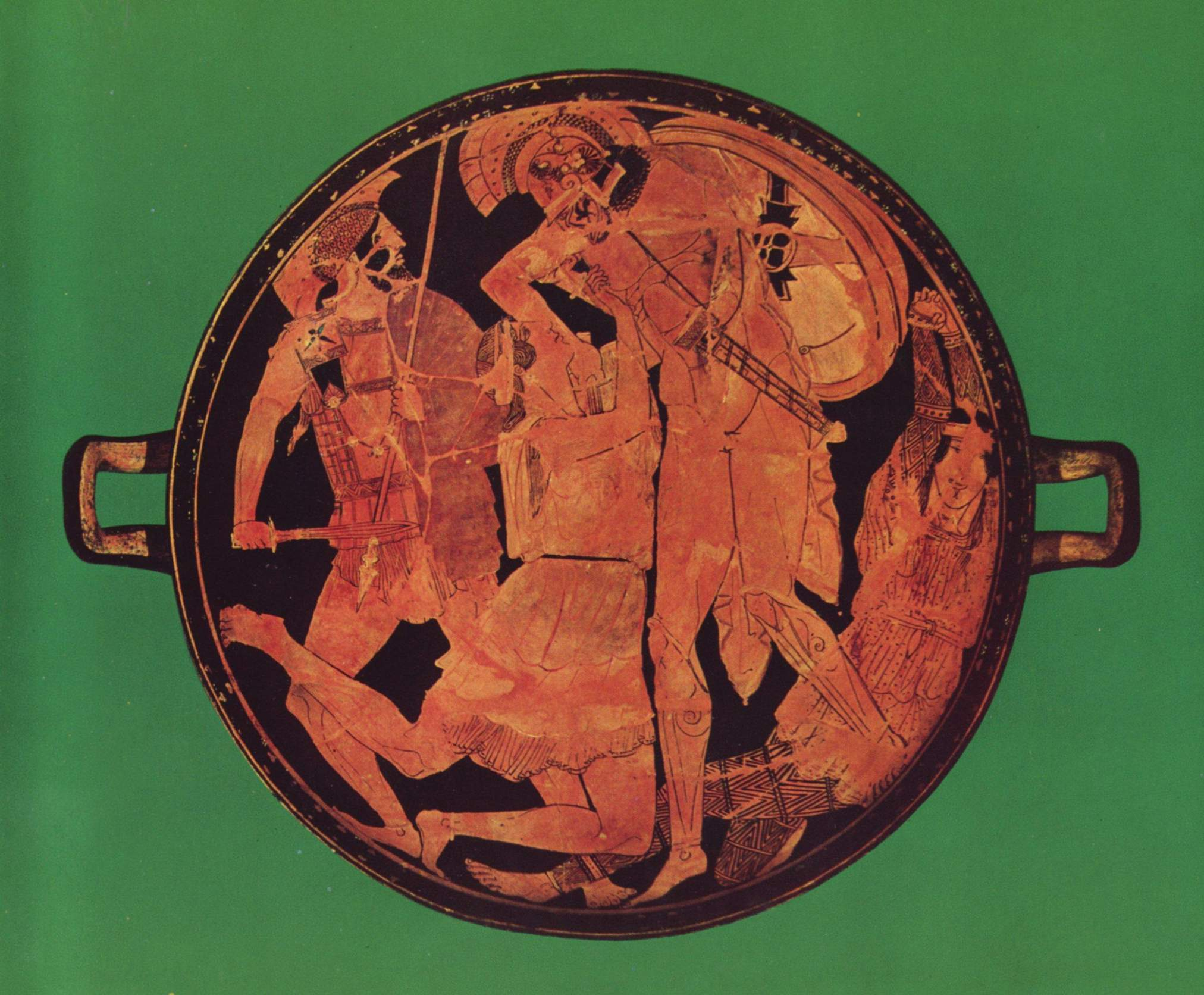
Achilles kills Penthesilea; tondo of an Attic red-figure kylix, 470–460 BC, found at Vulci

In the five-book epic Aethiopis, which was part of the Epic Cycle (or Cycle of Troy) on the Trojan War, the coming to Troy of Penthesilea and Memnon was described in detail. The Aethiopis was published in the 8th century BC and is attributed to Arctinus of Miletus. The main character of the epic is Achilles, who fights Penthesilea and Memnon before he is himself killed. Although Aethiopis has been lost, the Epic Cycle has been adapted and recycled in different periods of the classical age. The tradition of retelling the epic fall of Troy is indebted to Homer's Iliad and Odyssey, which were grounded in oral storytelling and were only written down when the Greek alphabet was adopted in ancient Greece. Some ancient comments on the Iliad indicate that the battle was originally part of the poem, the Amazons arriving during Hector's funeral.

In the Aethiopis Penthesilea is a Thracian woman warrior. She was an Amazon and daughter of Ares, who comes to help the Trojans. She arrived with twelve other Amazon warriors. After a day of distinguishing herself on the battlefield, Penthesilea confronts Achilles and a fight ensues. Achilles kills her, and Thersites taunts Achilles by accusing him of having fallen in love with Penthesilea. Thersites is killed by Achilles after he punches Thersites so hard he dies; he then travels to the island of Lesbos to be purified before returning to Troy and fighting Memnon.

According to Homer, the Trojan king Priam had fought the Amazons in his youth on the Sangarius River in Phrygia, some 350 miles (560 km) east of Troy. Later writers of antiquity located Amazons geographically in Anatolia and started an epic tradition where Greek heroes, such as Heracles and Theseus, fought an Amazon warrior of distinction. The Aethiopis version of the Penthesilea legend has become known as the Homeric tradition.

=== Other traditions ===
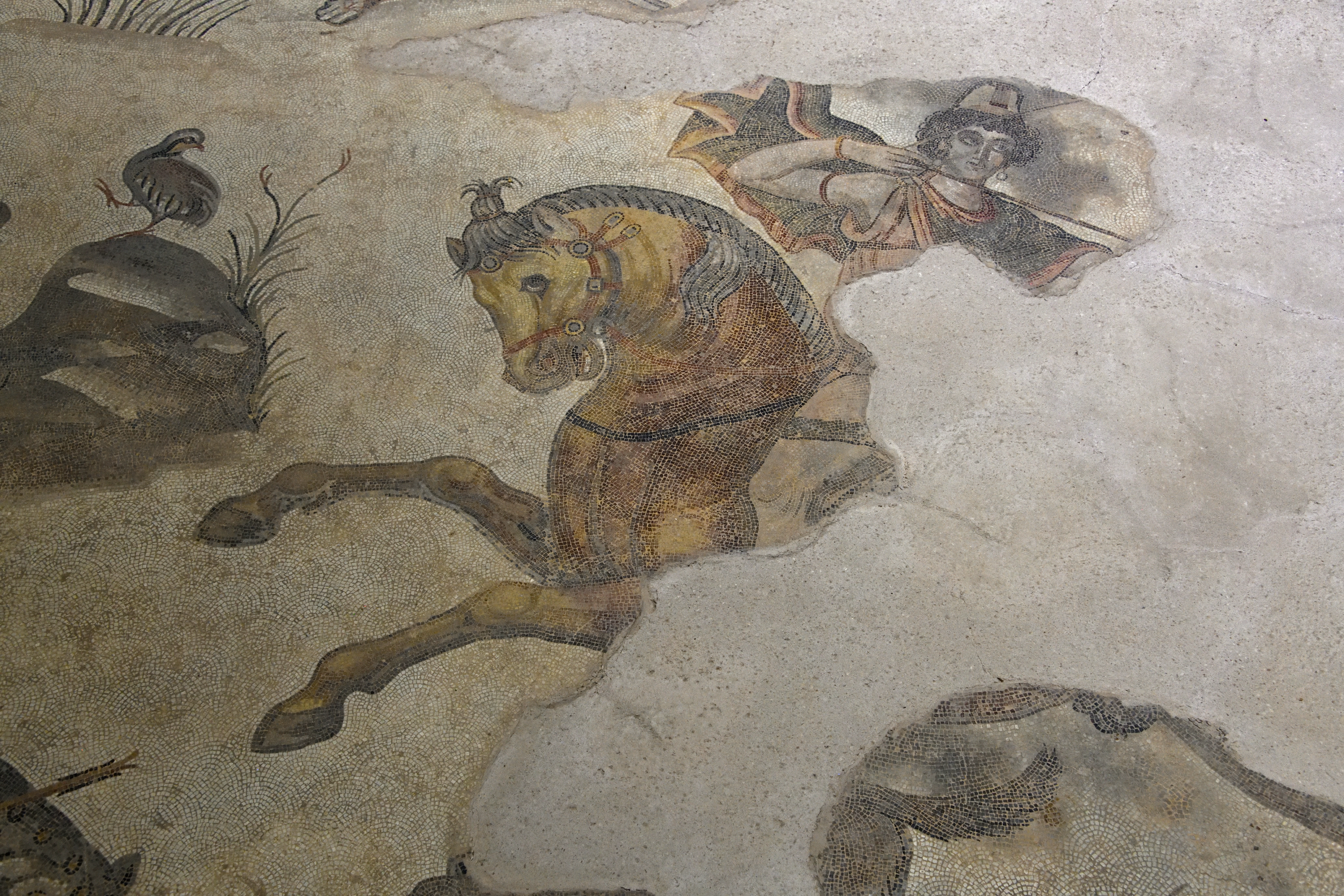
Penthesilea on a late antique mosaic

Different traditions of the Penthesilea legend appear to have existed at the time the Epic Cycle was published. One myth states that it was Neoptolemus who killed Penthesilea, instead of Achilles. In a lost poem of Stesichorus, believed to have been published in the 7th or 6th century BC, Penthesilea rather than Achilles had killed Hector.

== Portrayal in antiquity ==
=== Literature ===
==== Pseudo-Apollodorus ====
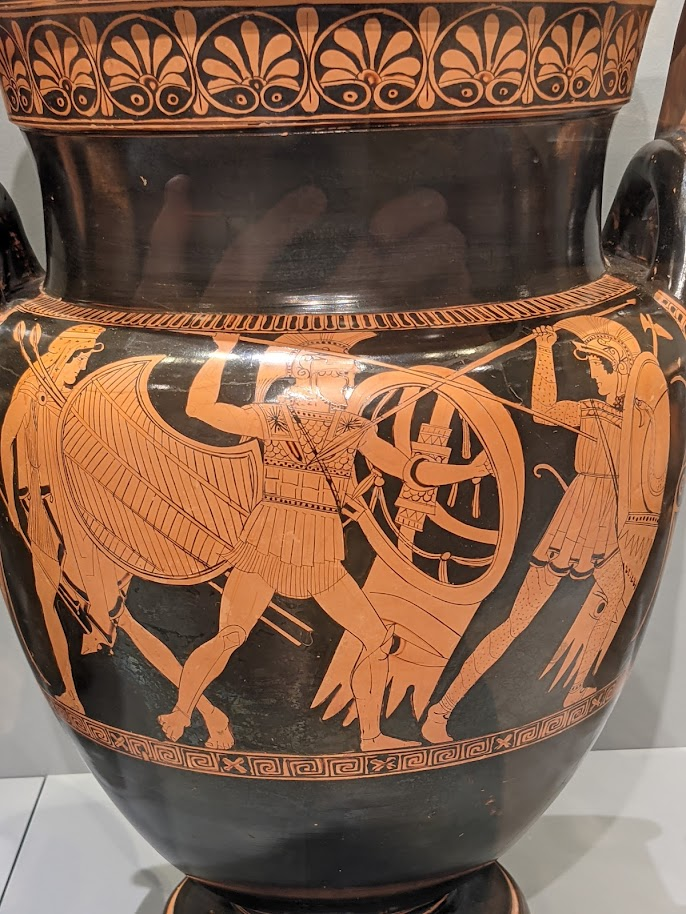
Attic red-figure volute krater attributed to the Painter of the Berlin Hydria, dating c. 450 BCE, depicting Achilles slaying Penthesilea, Eskenazi Museum of Art

In the Pseudo-Apollodorus Epitome of the Bibliotheke she is said to have been killed by Achilles, "who fell in love with the Amazon after her death and slew Thersites for jeering at him".

==== Lycophron ====
In the 3rd century BC, Lycophron went against the grain of the Homeric tradition. The poet had been born in Euboea, the site of a shrine to wounded Amazons who had fought in a mythic Battle for Athens. Lycophron tells the story of the young Amazon Clete, Penthesilea's attendant, who had been left behind in Pontus. Clete sets out with a company of Amazons to search for Penthesilea when she does not return from the Trojan War. The ship with Amazons is swept off course and after a shipwreck on the toe of Italy in Bruttium, Clete becomes the queen of the Amazons that settle there.

==== Virgil ====
In Virgil's Aeneid, written between 29 and 19 BC, the Trojan army falls back when Achilles advances. Achilles drags the greatest Trojan warrior, Hector, around the city walls and sells his dead body to king Priam for gold. Penthesilea is cast as a tragic Amazon queen who came too late in vain to help the beleaguered city. When Aeneas sees the panel of Penthesilea in the Juno temple of Carthage, he knows that the defeat of Penthesilea and Memnon presage a chain of events that would culminate in the sacking of the city. Penthesilea's fate also foreshadows that of Camilla, which is described in detail by Virgil later in the epic. According to Virgil, Penthesilea led an army of Amazons and is a bellatrix (Latin for "female warrior") who dared to fight men (audetque viris concurrere virgo).

Virgil based his narrative in Homer's Iliad, while relying on the Epic Cycle for his portrayal of Penthesilea. Virgil also reworked oral legends into an epic on the foundation of Rome. In Aeneid the Romans descended from the hero Aeneas and Trojan refugees who sailed to Italy after the Trojan War. This interweaving of the Penthesilea legend with the founding legend of Rome can be traced to Lycophron.

==== Diodorus ====
In his universal history Bibliotheca historica, Diodorus Siculus in the 1st century BC celebrated Penthesilea as the last Amazon to win renown for valour in war. Diodorus wrote that after the Trojan War the Amazons diminished and tales of their former glory began to be considered mere legends.

==== Smyrnaeus ====
In the 4th century AD, the imperial Greek poet Quintus Smyrnaeus made Penthesilea the subject of the first book in Posthomerica. In this epic, Smyrnaeus tries to finish Homer by telling the colourful story of how the city of Troy fell. This work explains how Penthesilea came to be at Troy: Penthesilea had killed Hippolyta with a spear when they were hunting deer; this accident caused Penthesilea so much grief that she wished only to die, but, as a warrior and an Amazon, she had to do so honorably and in battle. She therefore was easily convinced to join in the Trojan War. Smyrnaeus also describes in gory detail how the army of Amazons surprises the Greek army and the slaughter that commenced. The Amazon Klonie, after slaying her first opponent, is in turn killed. Penthesilea mows through the Greek lines, killing eight warriors, and cuts the arm off the Greek warrior who had killed Klonie. Penthesilea's Amazon comrades Bremusa, Evandre and Thermodosa fight valiantly alongside her but are slain, and so are Derinoe, Alkibie and Derimachea. Penthesilea slays more Greeks with axe and spear. From the towers the Trojan women watch and Penthesilea inspires the young Hippodamia, who urges the Trojan women to join the battle. Antimachus' daughter Tisiphone gives an inspirational speech: "not in strength are we inferior to men; the same our eyes, our limbs the same; one common light we see, one air we breathe; nor different is the food we eat. What then denied to us hath heaven on man bestowed? O let us hasten to the glorious war!"

=== Art ===
==== Temple of Apollo Epicurius at Bassae ====
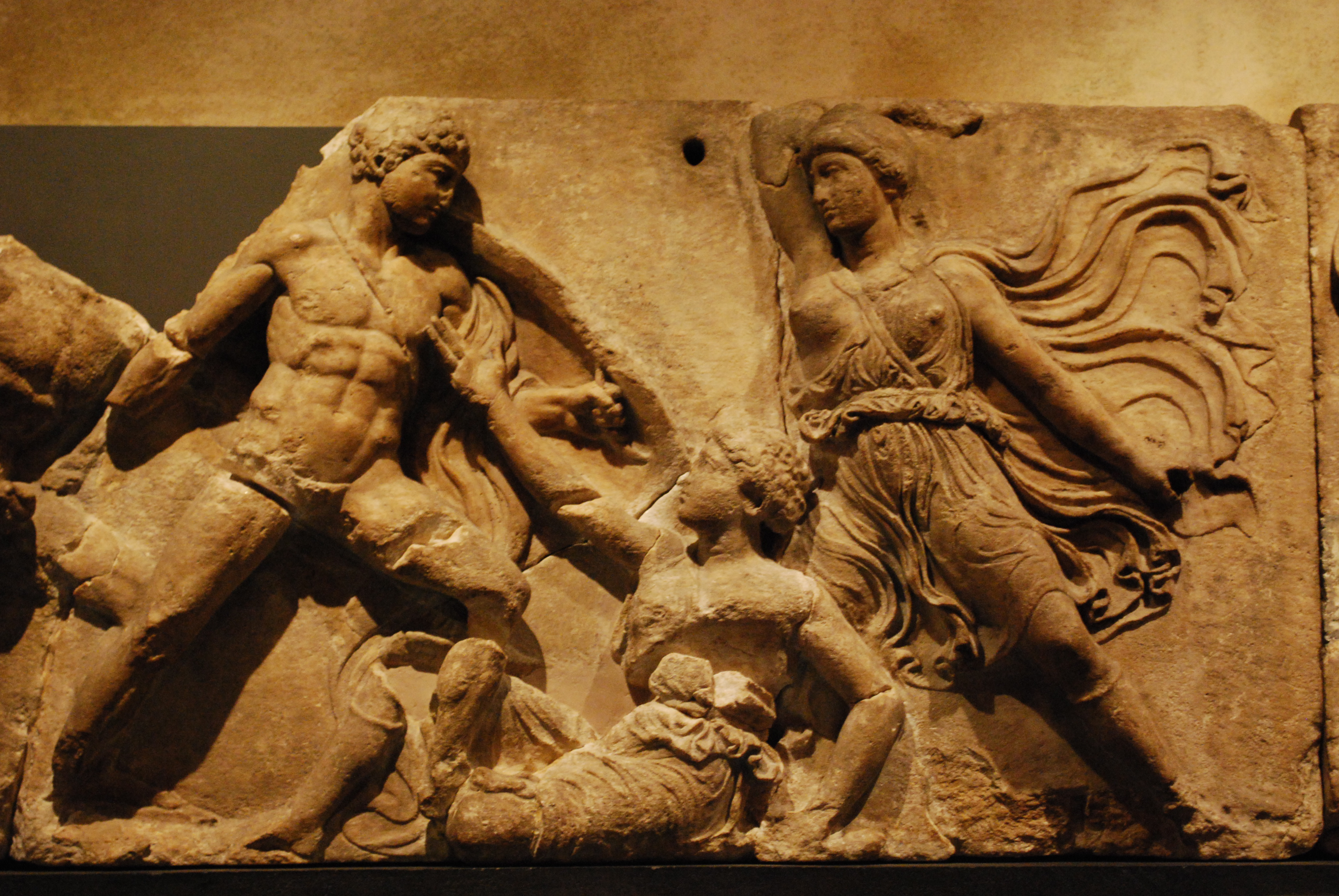
BM 537 Achilles (left) and Penthesilea (on the ground).

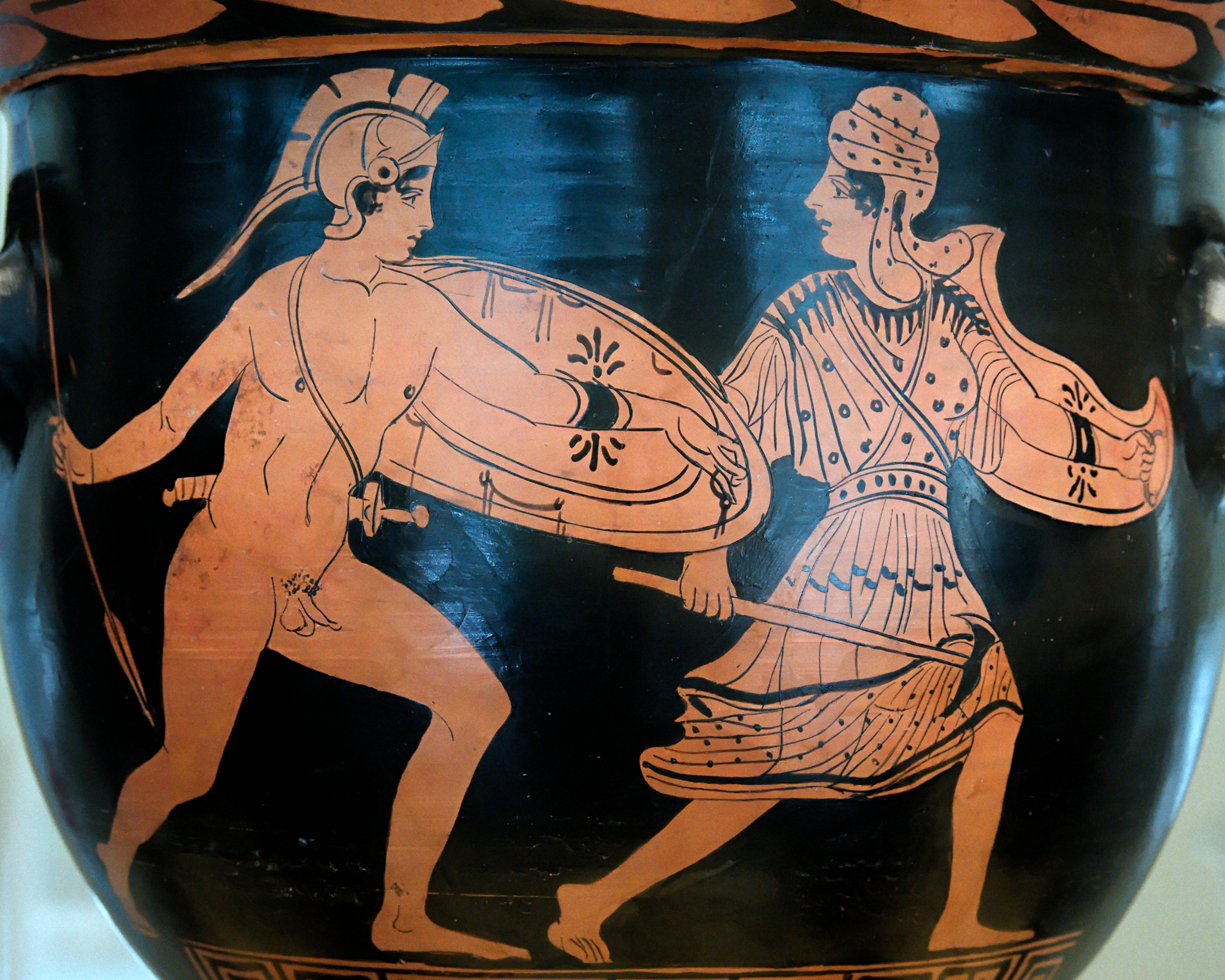
The battle of Achilles and Penthesilea. Lucanian red-figure bell-krater, late 5th century BC

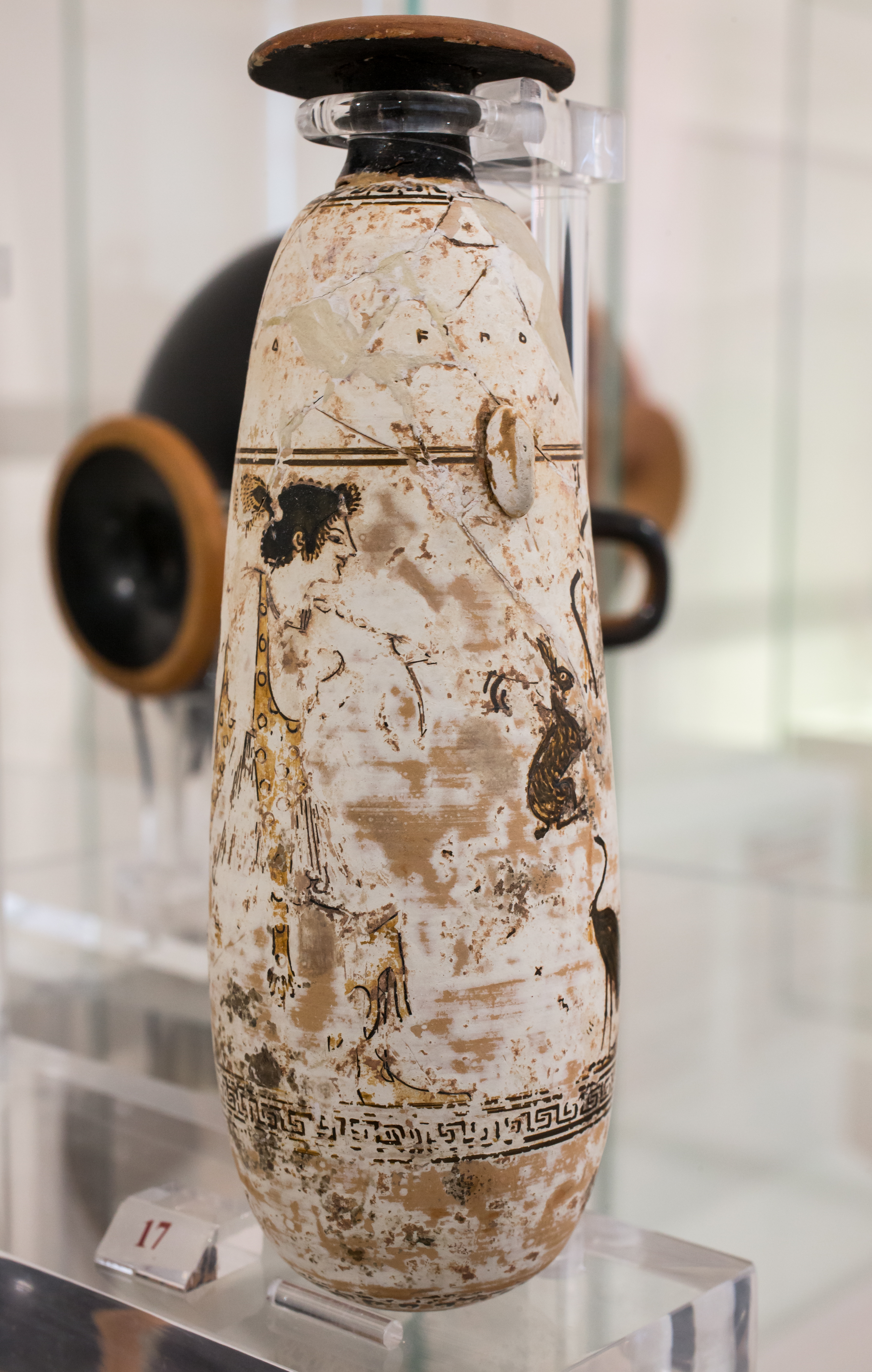
Thracian huntress courting Penthesilea, Pasiades Painter, ca. 525–500 BC.

At the Temple of Apollo Epicurius, built in the mid- to late-5th century BC, scenes from the Trojan War are preserved in the Bassae Frieze, a high relief marble sculpture in 23 panels. Here the Greek army is charged by the Amazons, who gain the upper hand, and at the height of the battle Achilles slays Penthesilea on a slab known as BM 537. Achilles and Penthesilea are flanked by a Greek soldier and an Amazon. Penthesilea is identified as a queen by a crown. Penthesilea, shown on the ground just before being struck, and Achilles are exchanging a gaze. The final slab of the series on the Amazons depicts a truce between the Greek army and the Amazons at the end of the battle.

==== Temple of Zeus at Olympia ====
According to Pausanias, the throne of Zeus at Olympia bore a painting by Panaenus of the dying Penthesilea being supported by Achilles. Pausanias wrote "And, at the extremity of the painting, is Penthesilea breathing her last, and Achilles supporting her". The motif of Achilles supporting a dying or dead Penthesilea has been preserved at the Temple of Aphrodisias and was reinterpreted in sculptures and mosaics in ancient Rome.

==== Vase figure ====
A black-figure vase from about 510–500 BC shows Achilles carrying Penthesilea from the battlefield.

The subject of Penthesilea was treated so regularly by the so-called Penthesilea Painter, who was active between 470 and 450 BC, that Adolf Furtwängler dubbed him "The Penthesilea Painter". A considerable corpus for this innovative and prolific painter, whose work bridged the Severe style and Classicism and must have had a workshop of his own, was rapidly assembled in part by J.D. Beazley.

A white-ground alabastron from the 6th century BCE depicts Penthesilea as being courted by a female Thracian hunter, labelled Theraichme. It appears to be a reversal of a common male courtship scene in Athenian art, where a suitor gifts a token of affection – typically a rabbit – to his beloved.

== Later portrayals ==
=== In the Middle Ages ===
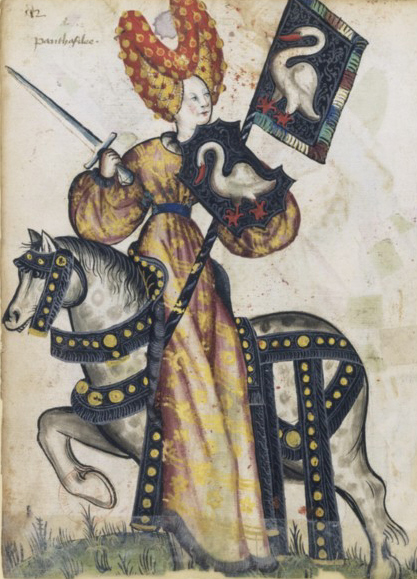
Miniature of Penthesilea as one of the Lady Worthies, published in late medieval France between circa 1460 and 1470.

In Medieval Europe, the Penthesilea legend was developed and recycled, with Achilles fading into the background. In illuminations that illustrated manuscripts, Penthesilea was cast as a medieval warrior queen. A tradition developed where Penthesilea entered the Trojan War because of her reverence for the Trojan hero Hector. Penthesilea appears in the Roman de Troie (1160) by Benoît de Sainte-Maure as a chivalric heroine, and through this became part of the medieval genre roman antique, which recycled Greek and Roman myths in a chivalric romance context.

In late medieval Europe the legend was further popularised in Christine de Pizan's The Book of the City of Ladies (1405) and John Lydgate's Troy Book (1420). Penthesilea and Hector became romantic heroes. Penthesilea came to Troy because she had fallen in love with the virtuous knight Hector from afar. Hector and Penthesilea were portrayed as personifications of the ideals of chivalry. When kneeling before Hector's corpse, Penthesilea promises to avenge his death. Penthesilea fights at the side of the Trojan army, killing many Greek soldiers, but is slain by Achilles' son. In this tradition of the legend, her body is taken to the Thermodon for burial. Along the Terme River, various temple burial sites attest to the heroic status Penthesilea had as Amazon queen in the Middle Ages.

In John Gower's Confessio Amanatis she travels to Troy from Pafagoine. She is slain by Pirrus the son of Achilles. Philemenis returned her body for burial. He was rewarded with three fair maidens per year.

Biographical lists of strong women were published; some included Penthesilea. The 1405 Chronicle (known as Haagse handschrift) by the herald Baviere included Penthesilea and the two Amazons Semiramis and Tomyris among the strong women. A Netherlandish list of 101 strong women published between 1465 and 1480 included Penthesilea. This list of 101 women circulated at the court of Mary of Burgundy and was read by members of the Brussels administration. Philippe Bouton in 1480 published a Miroir des dames, which included Penthesilea.

=== Boccaccio ===
Between 1361 and 1362 the Italian Giovanni Boccaccio wrote the first collection of biographies in Western literature that was devoted to famous women. The De Mulieribus Claris was published in Latin and dedicated to Andrea Acciaioli, the Countess of Altavilla. According to Boccaccio, Penthesilea succeeded the Amazon queens Antiope and Orithyia. She was in strength and skill superior to previous queens. According to Boccaccio, Penthesilea entered the Trojan War against the Greeks to impress Hector. But Penthesilea and her Amazon troops were slain at the end of a hard-fought battle with the Greeks. After recounting Penthesilea's accomplishments in De Mulieribus Claris Boccaccio wrote that "if we remember that practical experience can change natural dispositions" the legends of the Amazons become plausible. He wrote that "through practice, Penthesilea and women like her became much more manly in arms than those born male" who had been weakened through idleness and love of pleasure. The notion that upbringing and training were central to gender differences was discussed by Agostino Strozzi and Mario Equicola in 16th century Italy.

=== Heinrich von Kleist ===
The treatment of Penthesilea that has received most critical attention since the early twentieth century is the drama Penthesilea by Heinrich von Kleist, who cast its "precipitously violent tempo" in the form of twenty-four consecutive scenes without formal breaks into acts. In Kleist's Penthesilea, however, Achilles is slain by Penthesilea. When she realizes that she and her pack of dogs have mangled the object of their desire, she dies herself through "a crushing feeling".

The Swiss composer Othmar Schoeck wrote a 90-minute one-act opera, Penthesilea (Dresden, 1927) based on Kleist's drama. The French composer Pascal Dusapin's opera based on Kleist's work premiered in 2015 at La Monnaie in Brussels under the baton of Ludovic Morlot.

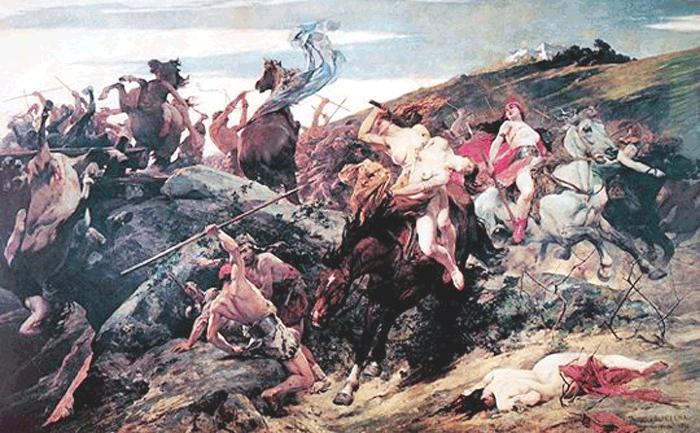
A 19th century interpretation of Penthesilea fighting, by Arturo Michelena

=== Hugo Wolf ===
Austrian composer Hugo Wolf (1860-1903) wrote a symphonic poem on the legend entitled Penthesilea (1883–85).

=== Edward Bellamy ===
In Edward Bellamy's 1888 book Looking Backward, the main character (Julian West) is transported in time from 1887 (discovery date of the asteroid Penthesilea) to 2000. There, in the year 2000, the main character reads a book by one of the 20th century's most famous writers by the fictional name of Berrian. The title of this book is "Penthesilia" [sic] and it is a romance that supposedly exposes the true power and fullest extent of love.

=== Robert Graves ===
In Robert Graves' short poem "Penthesileia", Achilles becomes infatuated with Penthesilia immediately after killing her, and then slays Thersites for his mockery of Achilles' behavior. The last verse is open to interpretation; some have interpreted it that Penthelisea's ghost thanks Thersites for standing up for her honour, but it has been suggested that she thanks Achilles for killing Thersites.

=== Judy Grahn ===
In Judy Grahn's epic long poem in the form of a play The Queen of Swords, Penthesilea, a long-dead wounded Amazon, rises from the floor of an underground Lesbian bar where the middle class woman, Helen, is being schooled in remembering her powerful past and in reconnecting with women. Pen (as she is called in the text) asks Helen to touch her so she can live on earth again, and, reluctantly, Helen does this.Lesbian editor and publisher of Sinister Wisdom Julie Enszer states, "In this book, Helen appears again this time as a wife who goes on a “transformative journey.” The poem features an Amazon Chorus and Pen, the Amazon queen in a lesbian bar. Here Pen describes herself:

Penthesilea, Amazon Queen, who went once

to war to save Queen Helen (that was you).

“Able to make men mourn” my name signifies,

supreme Amazon speeding to the neediness of Troy,

leader of twelve good warrior maidens,

battle-scarred

and with fierce reputation. We were the last

hope that queenly Troy could keep intact

the power of women and the greatest beauty in the world.

== Notes ==
Preceded by Hippolyta	Queen of the Amazons	Succeeded by Antianara
