= Arctinus of Miletus =

Ancient Greek poet

Arctinus of Miletus or Arctinus Milesius (Ancient Greek: Ἀρκτῖνος ὁ Μιλήσιος) was a Greek epic poet credited with the composition of at least two works in the epic cycle. Traditionally dated between 775 BC and 741 BC, Artemon of Klozmenai claimed he was a pupil of Homer, and his father was Teleus son of Nauteus.

Phaenias of Eresus placed him in the 7th century BC and claimed that he was defeated by Lesches of Pyrrha in a poetical competition. One of the "cyclic poets", Arctinus composed the epics Aethiopis and Iliupersis or Sack of Troy, which are included in the Trojan War cycle; Athenaeus remarks that some credit him with writing the Titanomachy.

== Writings ==
The poems of Arctinus have mostly vanished, but their contents were summarized in the Chrestomathy ascribed (probably wrongly) to Proclus the Neo-Platonist of the 5th century AD. Although Proclus' work is also mostly lost, an excerpt describing the poems of the epic cycle was included at the beginning of the manuscript Venetus A kept at the Biblioteca Marciana in Venice, and Photius as well drew upon Proclus' summaries for his own Bibliotheca.

The Aethiopis (Αἰθιοπίς), in five books, thought to be named after the Aethiopian Memnon, who fought on the side of the Trojans after the conclusion of the Iliad. According to Proclus, Arctinus' work begins immediately after the death of Hector. Penthesileia, queen of the Amazons, comes to aid the Trojan side, only to be slain by Achilles. Then Memnon, son of Eos arrives to take Penthesileia's place, only to also be slain by Achilles. Then after routing the Trojans, Achilles rushes into the city, where he is slain by Paris and Apollo. After recovering his body the Achaeans begin to bury him, only for his mother Thetis to transport the corpse to the White Island. The Aethiopis concluded with the dispute between Ajax and Odysseus over Achilles' arms.

The Sack of Troy (Iliou Persis) told the stories of the Trojan Horse, Sinon, and Laocoön, the capture of the city, and the departure of the Greeks pursued by the anger of Athena at the rape of Cassandra by Ajax the Lesser. The Little Iliad, usually ascribed to Lesches, bridged the gap in the story-line between Aethiopis and the Sack of Troy.
