= Agostino Strozzi =

Augustinian abbot and author

- Born: c. 1450; Italy
- Died: after 1505
- Education: University of Ferrara
- Occupations: Augustinian abbot, writer
- Era: Renaissance
- Notable work: La difesa delle donne (The Defense of Women)
- Movement: Humanism, Querelle des femmes

Agostino Strozzi (c.1450 – after 1505) was an Italian Augustinian abbot and humanist writer from Mantua. Strozzi is recognized for his contribution to the pro-woman side of the querelle des femmes — "a debate about the nature and worth of women that unfolded in Europe from the medieval to the early modern period." Strozzi, commissioned by his cousin Margherita Cantelmo, wrote La defensione delle donne [The Defense of Women] in the 16th century.

Strozzi studied at the University of Ferrara and later served as abbot of the monastery of San Vito near Porta San Giorgio in Mantua.
