= Cyclic Poets =

Ancient Greek epic poets

The Cyclic Poets is a shorthand term for the early Greek epic poets, who were approximate contemporaries of Homer. No more is known about those poets than about Homer, but modern scholars regard them as having composed orally, as did Homer. In the classical period, surviving early epic poems were ascribed to those authors, just as the Iliad and Odyssey were ascribed to Homer. Together with Homer, whose Iliad covers a mere 50 days of the war, they cover the complete war "cycle", thus the name. Most modern scholars place Homer in the 8th century BC. The other poets listed below seemed to have lived in the 7th to the 5th centuries BC. Excluding Homer's, none of the works of the cyclic poets has survived.

== List of named poets ==
- Homer
- Stasinus of Cyprus
- Creophylus of Samos
- Panyassis of Halicarnassus
- Arctinus of Miletus
- Lesches of Pyrrha
- Cinaethon of Sparta
- Thestorides of Phocaea (the pseudo-Herodotean Life of Homer says that Thestorides used writing)
- Antimachus of Teos
- Eumelus of Corinth
- Agias of Troezen
- Diodorus of Erythrae
- Hegesias of Salamis (or Hegesinus)
- Cyprias of Halicarnassus
- Carcinus of Naupactus
- Prodicus of Phocaea
- Eugammon of Cyrene
- Pisinous of Lindus
- Pisander of Camirus

== List of early Greek epics ==
=== The Epic Cycle ===
- Cypria, ascribed to Homer or Stasinus of Cyprus or Hegesinus (or Hegesias) of Salamis or Cyprias of Halicarnassus
- Iliad, nearly always ascribed to Homer
- Aethiopis, ascribed to Arctinus of Miletus
  - Amazonia once ascribed to Homer (perhaps a different version of or another name for Aethiopis)
- Little Iliad, ascribed to Lesches of Pyrrha or Cinaethon of Sparta or Diodorus of Erythrae or Homer
- Sack of Troy, ascribed to Arctinus of Miletus
- Return from Troy, ascribed to Eumelus of Corinth or Agias of Troezen or Homer
- Odyssey, usually ascribed to Homer
- Telegony, ascribed to Cinaethon of Sparta; otherwise said to have been stolen from Musaeus by Eugammon of Cyrene
  - Thesprotis (perhaps a different version of or another name for Telegony)

=== The Theban Cycle ===
- Oedipodea, ascribed to Cinaethon of Sparta
- Thebaid, sometimes ascribed to Homer
- Epigoni, ascribed to Antimachus of Teos or Homer
- Alcmeonis

=== Other epics ===
- Titanomachy, ascribed to Eumelus of Corinth
- Heracleia, said to have been stolen from Pisinous of Lindus by Pisander of Camirus
- Capture of Oechalia, said to have been given by Homer to Creophylus of Samos
- Naupactia, ascribed to Arctinus of Miletus or Carcinus of Naupactus
- Phocais, ascribed to Thestorides of Phocaea or Homer
- Minyas, ascribed to Prodicus of Phocaea
- Danais or Danaides
- Europia, perhaps also called Bougonia, ascribed to Eumelus of Corinth
