= Memnon =

Ethiopian king in Greek mythology

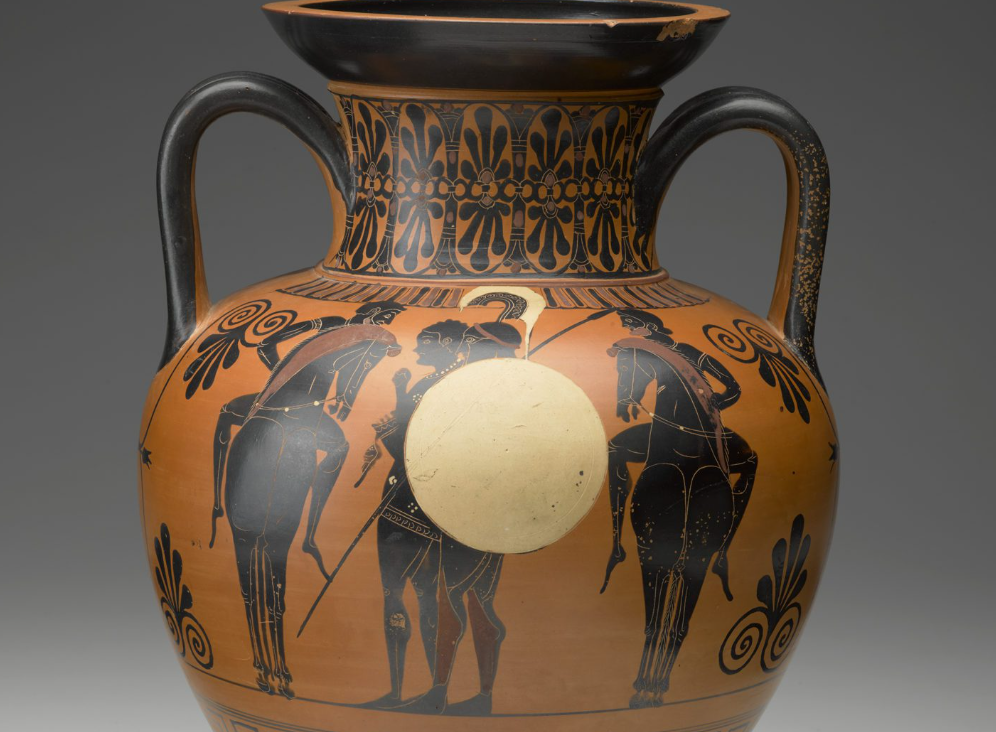
Attic neck-amphora featuring Heracles and Memnon (detail), c. 530-520 BC

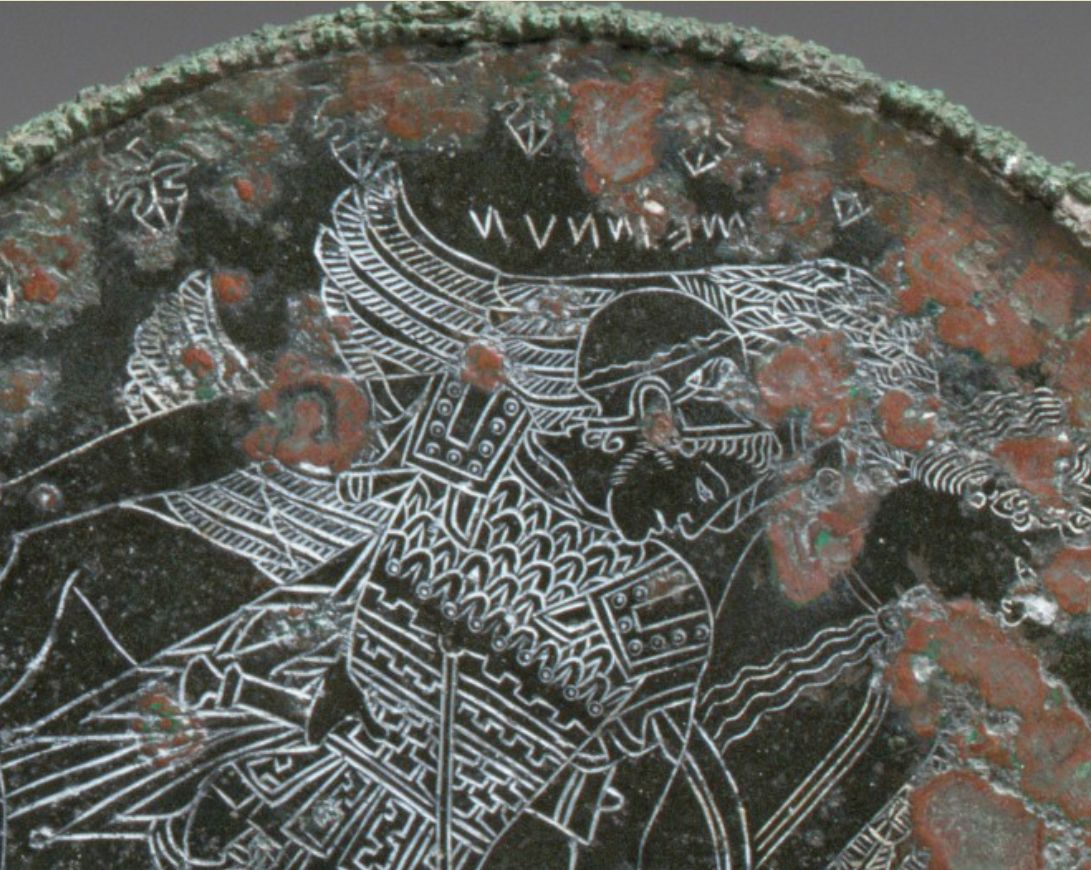
Eos retrieving the body of her son Memnon from the battlefield (detail); Etruscan bronze mirror, c. 450–420 BC

In Greek mythology, Memnon (/ˈmɛmnən/; Ancient Greek: Μέμνων, lit. 'resolute') was a king of Aethiopia and son of Tithonus and Eos. During the Trojan War, he brought an army to Troy's defense and killed Antilochus, Nestor's son, during a fierce battle. Nestor challenged Memnon to a fight, but Memnon refused, as there was little honor in killing such an aged man. Nestor then pleaded with Achilles to avenge his son's death. Despite warnings that soon after Memnon fell so too would Achilles, the two men fought. Memnon drew blood from Achilles, but Achilles drove his spear through Memnon's chest, sending the Aethiopian army running. The death of Memnon echoes that of Hector, another defender of Troy whom Achilles also killed out of revenge for a fallen comrade, Patroclus.

After Memnon's death, Zeus was moved by Eos' tears and granted him immortality. Memnon's death is related at length in the lost epic Aethiopis, likely composed after The Iliad, circa the 7th century BC. Quintus of Smyrna records Memnon's death in Posthomerica. His death is also described in Philostratus' Imagines.

Dictys Cretensis, author of a pseudo-chronicle of the Trojan War, writes that "Memnon, the son of Tithonus and Aurora, arrived with a large army of Indians and Aethiopians, a truly remarkable army which consisted of thousands and thousands of men with various kinds of arms, and surpassed the hopes and prayers even of Priam."

Strabo records a tradition, attributed to Simonides' dithyramb Memnon (one of the Deliaca), that Memnon was buried near Paltus in Syria, on the banks of the river Badas.

== Mythography ==
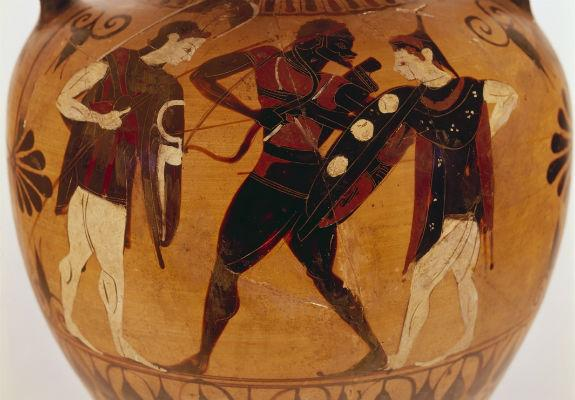
A black archer whose feet and legs face left, upper body facing right, flanked by two Amazones. "Mayence identifies the black person with Memnon, whereas Beazley and Bothmer regard him as an attendant of Memnon." Object ID: A130 Amphora Origin: Attica Category: Vase painting Material: terracotta; Location: Musées Royaux d'Art et d'Histoire; Bruxelles, BelgiumArtist: The Swing Painter Dating: 460-440 BC

Topos Text has catalogued 116 extant references to Memnon, the mythical Aethiopian King, son of Tithonus

=== Memnon in Quintus of Smyrna's Posthomerica ===
According to the Posthomerica, Memnon leading his army of Aethiopians, arrives at Troy in the immediate aftermath of an argument between Polydamas, Helen, and Priam that centres on whether or not the Aethiopian King will show up at all. Memnon's army is described as being too big to be counted and his arrival starts a huge banquet in his honour. As per usual the two leaders (Memnon and, in this case, Priam) end the dinner by exchanging glorious war stories, and Memnon's tales lead Priam to declare that the Aethiopian King will be Troy's saviour. Despite this, Memnon is very humble and warns that his strength will, he hopes, be seen in battle, although he believes it is unwise to boast at dinner.

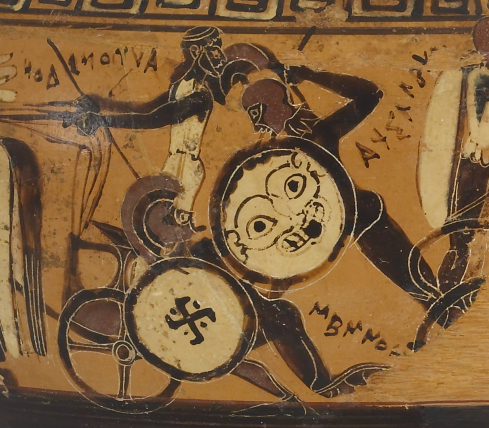
A Battle from the Trojan War in which two of the war's greatest heroes, Achilles and Memnon, clash in the presence of their mothers, the goddesses Thetis and Eos. Each warrior has his chariot standing by, with charioteers at the ready. Inscriptions, in the Corinthian alphabet, identify the figures. Walters Art Museum 48.2230 CC0 1.0

Before the next day's battle, so great is the divine love towards Memnon that Zeus makes all the other Olympians promise not to interfere in the fighting. In battle, Memnon kills Nestor's son, Antilochos, after Antilochos has killed Memnon's dear comrade, Aesop. Seeking vengeance and despite his age, Nestor tries to fight Memnon but the Aethiopian warrior insists it would not be just to fight such an old man, and respects Nestor so much that he refuses to fight. In this way, Memnon is seen as very similar to Achilles – both of them have strong sets of values that are looked upon favourably by the warrior culture of the time.

When Memnon reaches the Greek ships, Nestor begs Achilles to fight him and avenge Antilochos, leading to the two men clashing while both wearing divine armor made by Hephaestus, making another parallel between the two warriors.

=== Memnon as a Trojan War Ally ===
In Virgil's Aeneid, Memnon has led his troops from Aithopia to aid the Trojans: Eoasque acies et nigri Memnonis arma: "And the eastern battle arrays [the strategic arrangement of fighters in a battle] and arms of black Memnon."

==== The Armor of Memnon ====
The mythological tradition has Hephaistos crafting Memnon's armor just as he crafted for other famed heroes.

Venus implores Vulcan for Aeneas: "Therefore I come at last with lowly suit before a godhead I adore, and pray for gift of arms,—a mother for her son. You were not unrelenting to the tears of Nereus' daughter or Tithonus' bride." This event, described in the Aeneid, mirrors a similar scene in Homer's Iliad (Hom. Il. 18.558-709).

Psychostasia: (The Judgement of Zeus) The weighing of souls was Zeus' method of deciding which of two confronted heroes would die in combat. Zeus accomplishes this with this golden scales in (ll. 8.81-87), in Vergil's Aeneid.

Between Achilles and Memnon, Zeus favors both of them and makes each man tireless and huge so that the whole battlefield can watch them clash as demigods. Eventually, Achilles stabs Memnon through the heart, causing his entire army to flee in terror.

In honour of Memnon, the gods collect all the drops of blood that fall from him and use them to form a huge river that on every anniversary of his death will bear the stench of human flesh. The Aethiopians that stayed close to Memnon in order to bury their leader are turned into birds (which we now call Memnonides) and they stay by his tomb so as to remove dust that gathers on it.

Eos, the goddess of the dawn, begs Zeus to return her son; the king of the gods doesn't bring Memnon back to life, but he grants his mother a grace, that she will be able to see him alive and to caress him with her rosy fingers every day, when she opens the doors of heaven so as her brother Helios can begin his journey. That will last just a few moments.

John Malalas, in his Chronographia, writes that Memnon was the king of the Indians and arrived with his fleet and a great deal of wealth to support the Trojans, and took command of all the allied kings and the entire army before he was killed by Achilles.

== Memnon Pieta ==
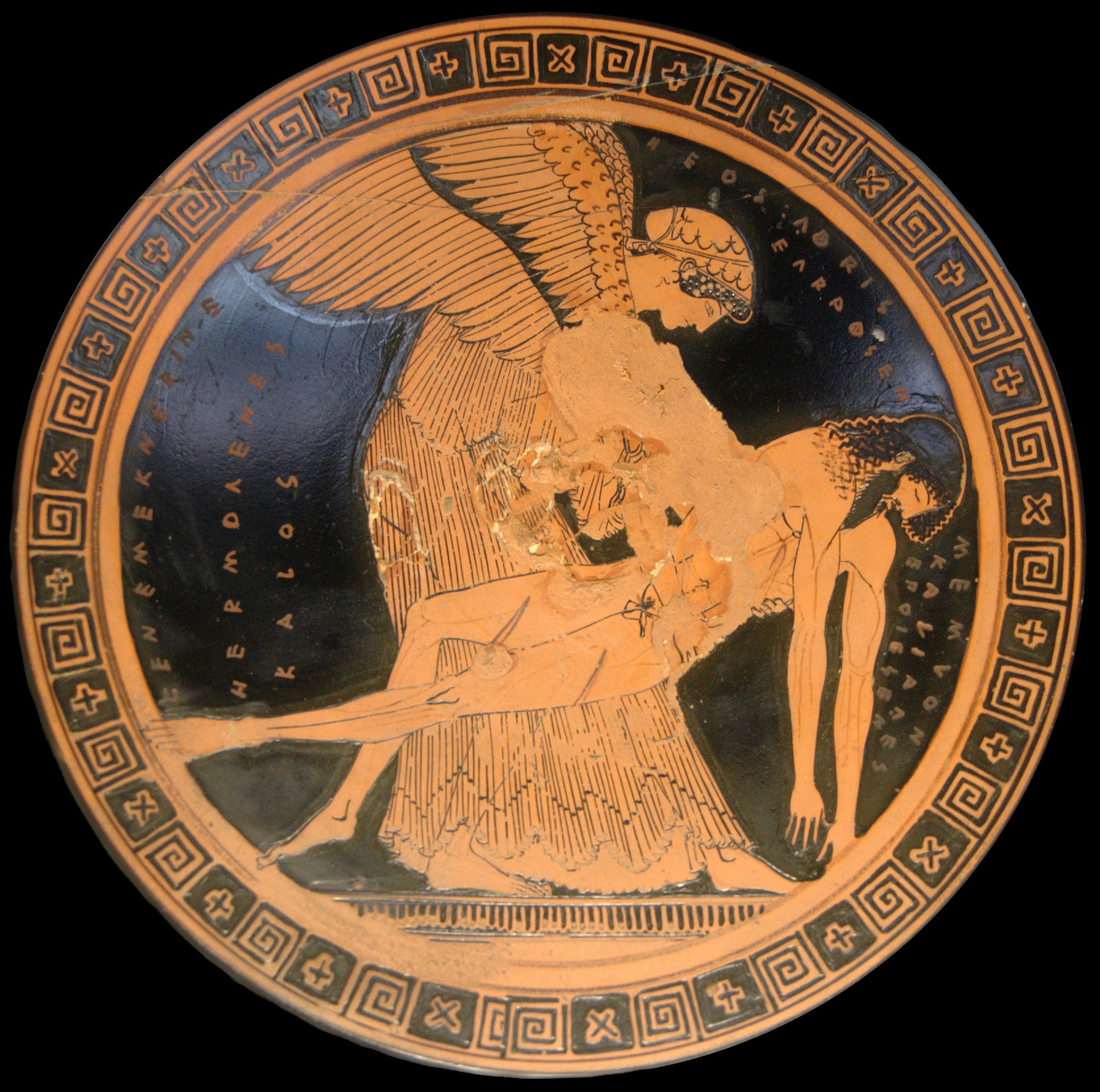
Memnon Pieta: Devotional image or narrative. Eos poignantly lifts her fallen son, Memnon, who lays listlessly in her arms. She is dressed in a finely pleated Ionic chiton which reveals the lines of her legs, wears a patterned sakkos on her head, and has elaborately patterned wings. Her arms and parts of the torso of Memnon are gone and restored with plain clay. Memnon's head and arms fall lifeless down at the right. Some details of his anatomy and the bleeding wounds are done in dilute glaze. The exergue upon which she stands has a tongue border at top; the border around the tondo is formed of alternating crosses, maeanders (alternating directions), and X's; the last two maeanders above the exergue mistakenly overlap.

Memnon Pieta: Louvre G115 (Vase) Eos lifts up the body of her son Memnon. "Kalos" is his inscription. Interior from an Attic red-figure cup, ca. 490–480 BC. From Capua, Italy. Signed by Douris (painter) .

Inscriptions on the left: ΕΕΝΕΜΕΚΝΕRINE (meaning unclear), HERMOΓΕΝΕS KALOS ("Hermogenes kalos" - "Hermogenes is beautiful"). Inscriptions on the right: HEOS ("Eos"), ΔΟRIS EΓRAΦSEN ("Doris Egraphsen" - Do(u)ris painted it). MEMNON ("Memnon"), KALIAΔES EΠOIESEN ("Kaliades epoiesen" - Kaliades made it).

== Mythical King of the Ethiopians ==
In respect to an ancient understanding mythical Memnon King of the Ethiopians (alternative spellings Aethiopians/Aithiopians) Merriam Webster defines the term as: "a member of any of the mythical or actual peoples usually described by the ancient Greeks as dark-skinned and living far to the south." This information concurs with the same information at Etymonline's entries reference the Greek αἴθω.

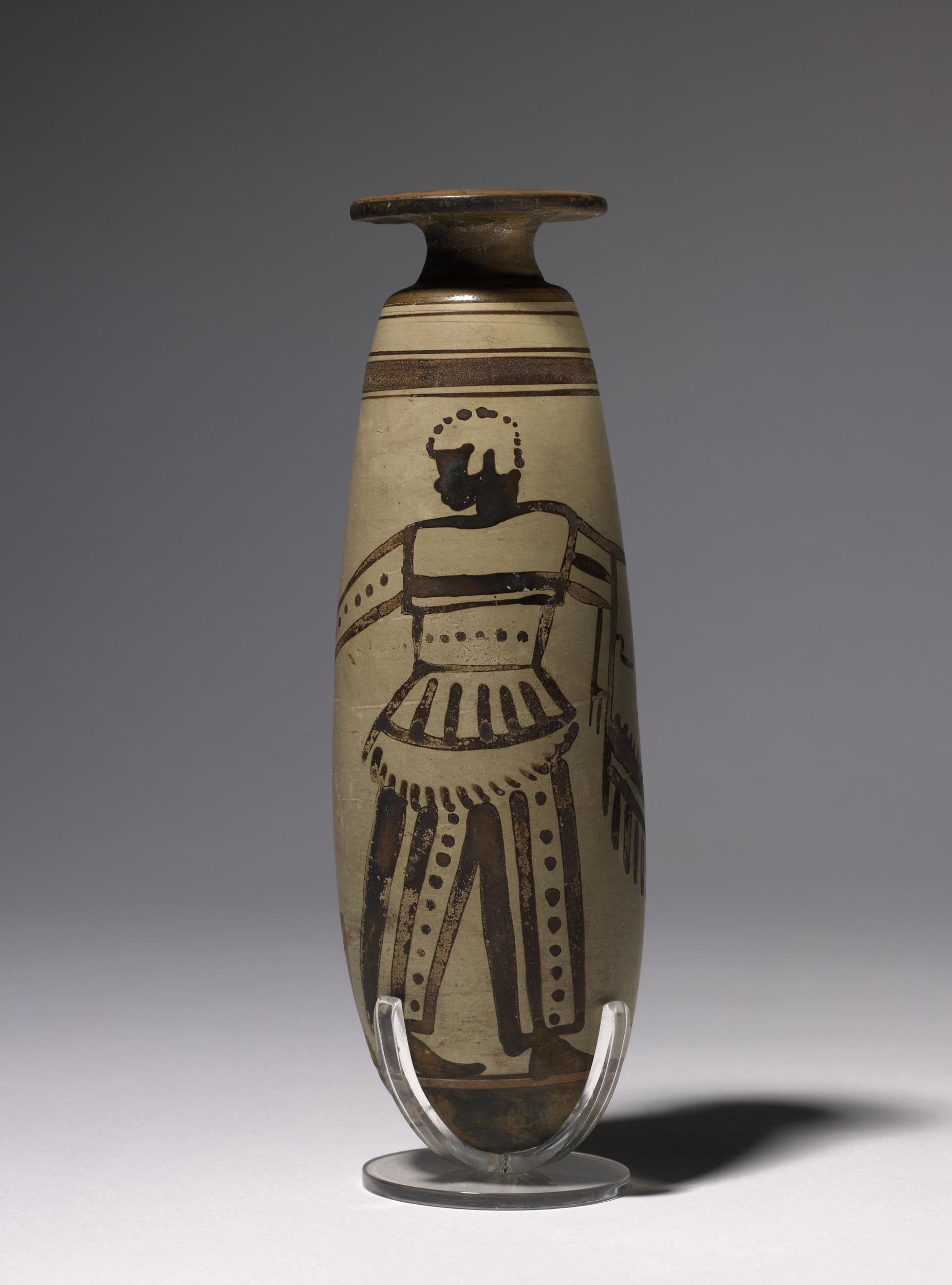
White-ground alabastron: 480 BC (circa) A figure (perhaps Memnon) to right, looking to left, with black face; he is attired as an archer, in sleeved jerkin, linen cuirass, and anaxyrides (trousers), all embroidered, in right hand a double-headed axe, over left arm a garment with maeander-border and fringe. Museum number 1875,0309.24 https://www.britishmuseum.org/collection/object/G_1875-0309-24

Roman writers and later classical Greek writers such as Diodorus Siculus ( 2.22.1 ) state Memnon is from Ethiopia and precisely king of "the Ethiopians who border upon Egypt".

One of the "cyclic poets", Arctinus of Miletus composed the epics Aethiopis and Sack of Troy, which were contributions to the Trojan War cycle, retold the death of Memnon. However, the original work by Arctinus only survives in fragments. Much of what is known about Memnon comes from post-Homeric Greek and Roman writers. Homer includes a passing mention to Memnon in the Odyssey.

Herodotus called Susa "the city of Memnon," Herodotus describes two tall statues with Egyptian and Aethiopian dress that some, he says, identify as Memnon; he disagrees, having previously stated that he believes it to be Sesostris. One of the statues was on the road from Smyrna to Sardis. Herodotus described a carved figure matching this description near the old road from Smyrna to Sardis.

Philostratus The Elder of Lemnos in his work Imagines describes art which depicts Memnon:

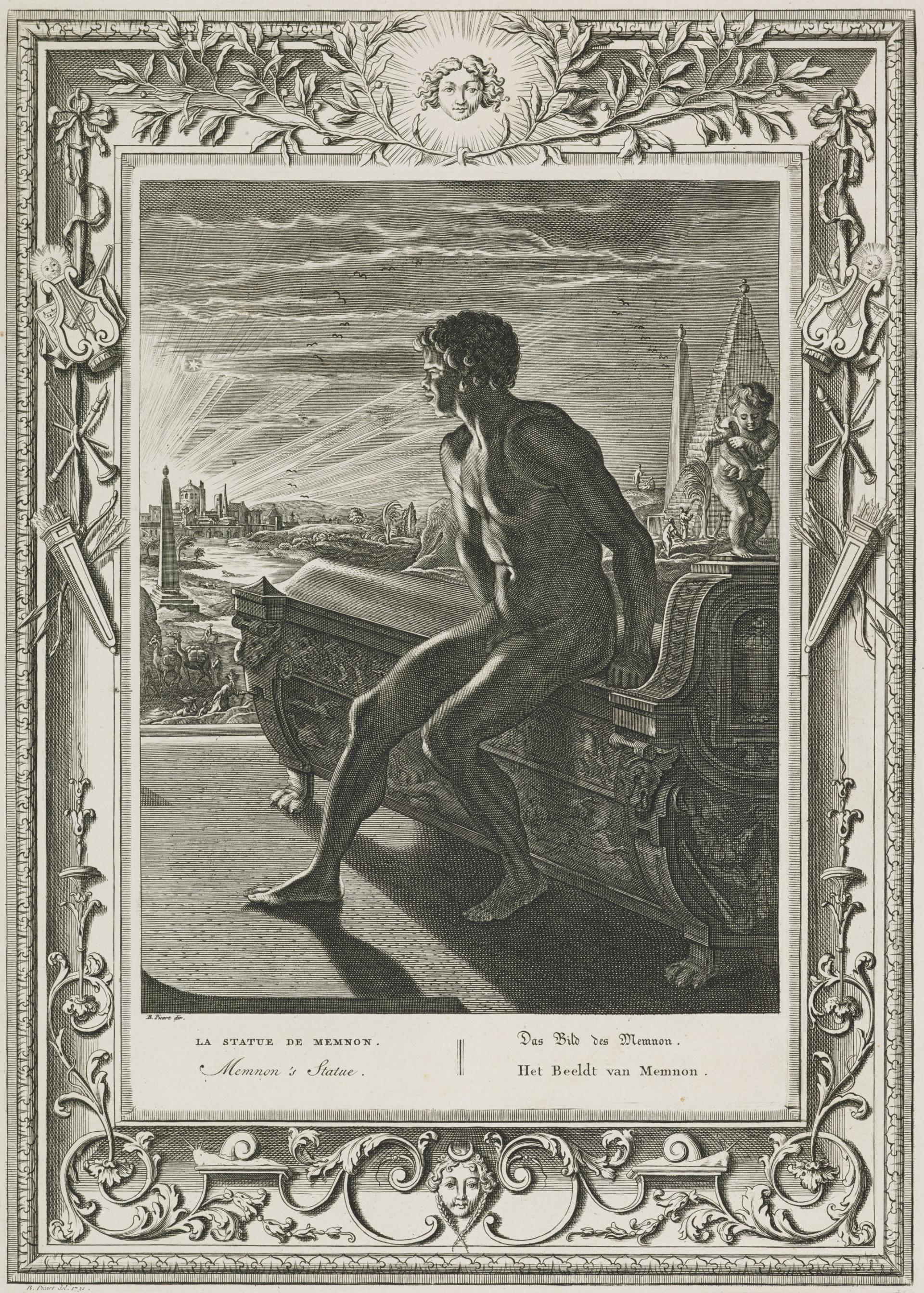
Artist: Bernard Picart (1673 - 1733) French Title: Plate from 'Le Temple des Muses' (Memnon's Statue) Date: 1731 Materials: Engraving on paper Accession number: P 3036.3 National Galleries of Scotland

1.1.7. MEMNON: This is the army of Memnon; their arms have been laid aside, and they are laying out the body of their chief for mourning; he has been struck in the breast, I think, by the ashen spear. For when I find a broad plain and tents and an entrenched camp and a city fenced in with walls, I feel sure that these are Ethiopians and that this city is Troy and that it is Memnon, the son of Eos, who is being mourned. When he came to the defence of Troy, the son of Peleus, they say, slew him, mighty though he was and likely to be no whit inferior to his opponent. Notice to what huge length he lies on the ground, and how long is the crop of curls, which he grew, no doubt, that he might dedicate them to the Nile; for while the mouth of the Nile belongs to Egypt, the sources of it belong to Ethiopia. See his form, how strong it is, even though the light has gone from his eyes; see his downy beard, how it matches his age with that of his youthful slayer. You would not say that Memnon's skin is really black, for the black of it shows a trace of ruddiness.

2.7.2 Now such is the scene in Homer, but the events depicted by the painter are as follows: Memnon coming from Ethiopia slays Antilochus who had thrown himself in front of this father, and he seems to strike terror among the Achaeans — for before Memnon's time black men were but a subject for story...

Memnon, stands, terrible to look upon, in the army of the Ethiopians, holding a spear and wearing a lion's skin and sneering at Achilles.

The Suda states that although Memnon led the Ethiopians at Troy, he was not Ethiopian himself, rather, he was from Susa and ruled over the peoples of that region.

== Memnon son of Eos (Aurora) and Tithonus ==
According to ancient Greek poets, Memnon's father Tithonus was snatched away from Troy by the goddess of dawn Eos and was taken to the ends of the earth on the coast of Oceanus.

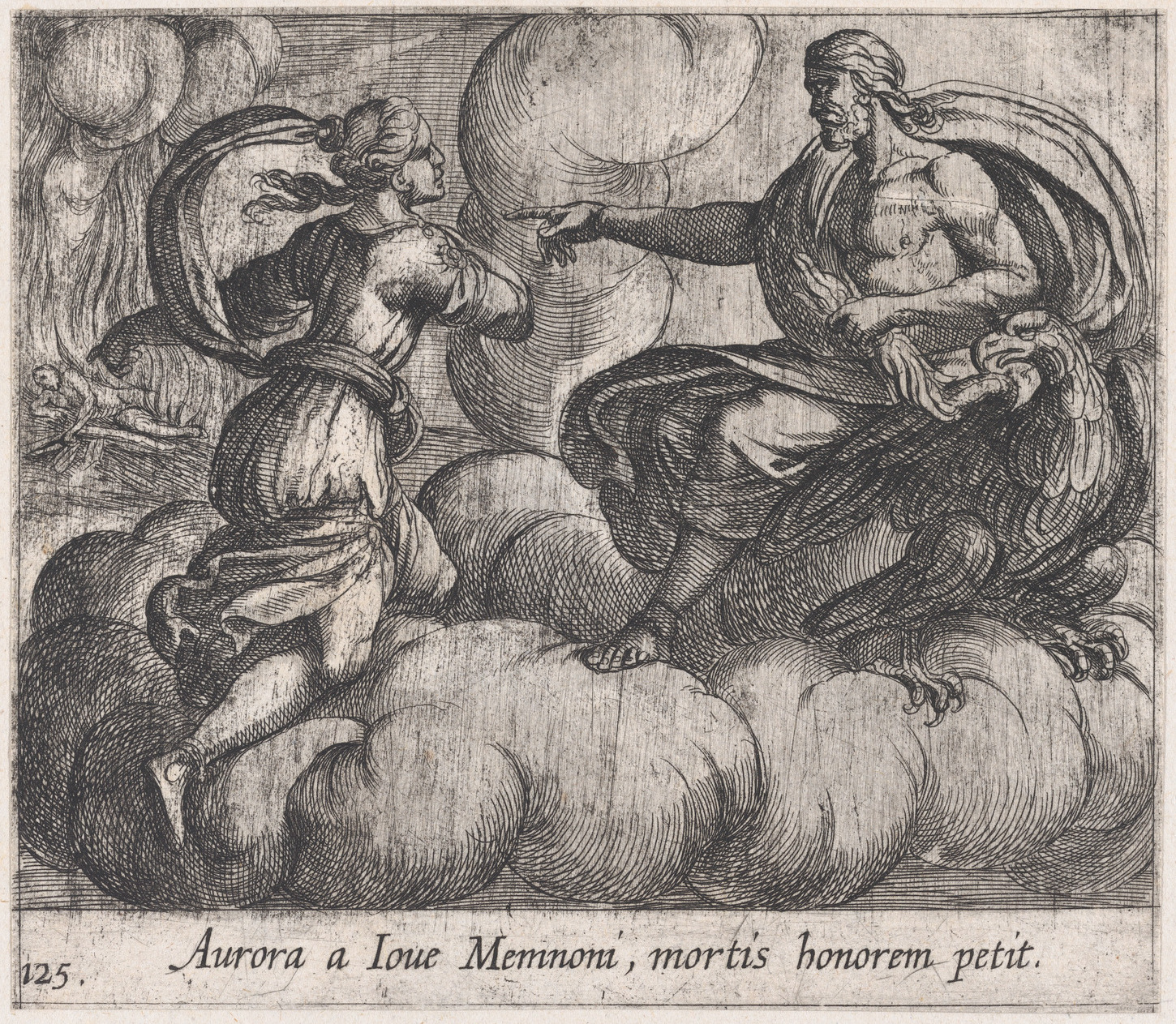
Plate 125: Aurora Asking Jupiter to Honor Memnon (Aurora an Iove Memnoni, mortis honorem petit), from Ovid's 'Metamorphoses' Artist: Antonio Tempesta (Italian, Florence 1555–1630 Rome)

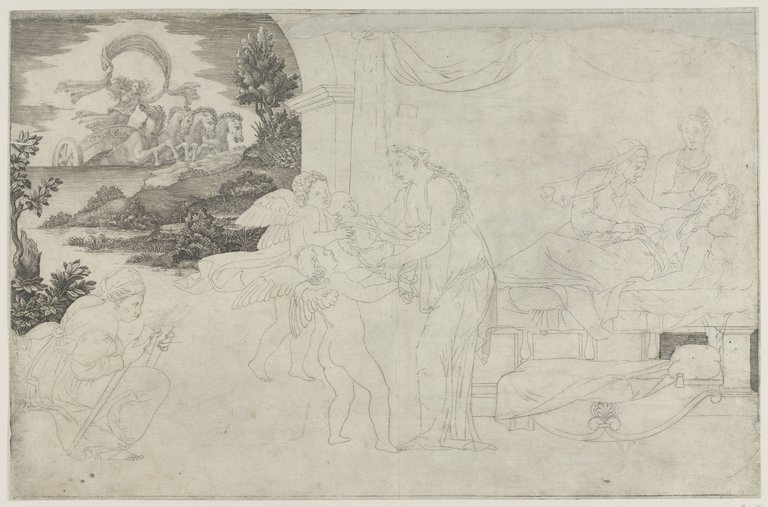
Cybèle remettant à deux génies Memnon, 1560 engraving by Giorgio Ghisi, Louvre Inventory number: 4414 LR/ Recto

According to Hesiod Eos bore to Tithonus bronzed armed Memnon, the King of the Aethiopians and lordly Emathion. Zephyrus, god of the west wind, like Memnon was also the first-born son of Eos by another father Astraeus, making him the half-brother of Memnon. According to Quintus Smyrnaeus, Memnon said himself that he was raised by the Hesperides on the coast of Oceanus.

According to Scholar Dean, Memnon, had a double or fused identity in classical antiquity. Considered both "Asian and African" for Greek and Roman writers because of his parentage and because of the geographical indeterminacy of Aithiopia and of India. Memnon was definitely black-skinned for Roman writers.

Memnon Pieta When Memnon died, Eos mourned greatly over the death of her son, and made the light of her brother, Helios (Sun), to fade, and begged Nyx (Night), to come out earlier, so she could be able to freely steal her son's body undetected by the armies of the Greeks and the Trojans. After his death, Eos, perhaps with the help of Hypnos and Thanatos, the gods of sleep and death respectively, transported the slain Memnon's dead body back to Aethiopia, and also asked Zeus to make Memnon immortal, a wish he granted.

== Colossi of Memnon ==
The Colossi of Memnon are two massive stone 3,400 year old twin statues of the Pharaoh Amenhotep III, located in Luxor, Egypt. Greeks and Romans visitors associated them with mythical Memnon since at least the first century-calling a portrait-colossus of that pharaoh "Memnon." This identification was based, argued by R. Drew Griffith on the fact that the statue faces sunrise on the winter solstice and so was linked to the dawn.

According to Pliny the Elder and others, one statue made a sound at morning time.

Pausanias also describes how he marveled at a colossal statue in Egypt, having been told that Memnon began his travels in Africa:

In Egyptian Thebes, on crossing the Nile to the so-called Pipes, I saw a statue, still sitting, which gave out a sound. The many call it Memnon, who they say from Aethiopia overran Egypt and as far as Susa. The Thebans, however, say that it is a statue, not of Memnon, but of a native named Phamenoph, and I have heard some say that it is Sesostris. This statue was broken in two by Cambyses, and at the present day from head to middle it is thrown down; but the rest is seated, and every day at the rising of the sun it makes a noise, and the sound one could best liken to that of a harp or lyre when a string has been broken.

Historian M. Bernal claims that the Greeks based Memnon on Ammenemes of Egypt. An Egyptian origin for Memnon appears likely from Zeus' weighing of his fate against Achilles' in the lost epic Aethiopis. There is a similar motif in the early spell of the Egyptian Book of the Dead. Like Memnon, Amenhotep formed military pacts with eastern kings, was son of a solar deity, and was exceptionally handsome.

Following an earthquake in 27 BC the northernmost of the colossi collapsed, and, at sunrise, began to produce an eerie musical sound that early Greek travelers interpreted as the mythical half-mortal Memnon calling out to his mother Eos, goddess of the dawn. Visitors came from far and wide to hear the song, including the Roman Emperor Hadrian and the Empress Sabine, who had to wait several days before the statue called out to them in 130 AD. The bust was restored in the Roman period and mounted on huge sandstone blocks. According to legend, Septimius Severus (r. 193-211 AD), seeking to repair the colossus, inadvertently silenced it forever.

== See also ==
- Emathion
- Penthesilea
