= Little Iliad =

Lost ancient Greek epic

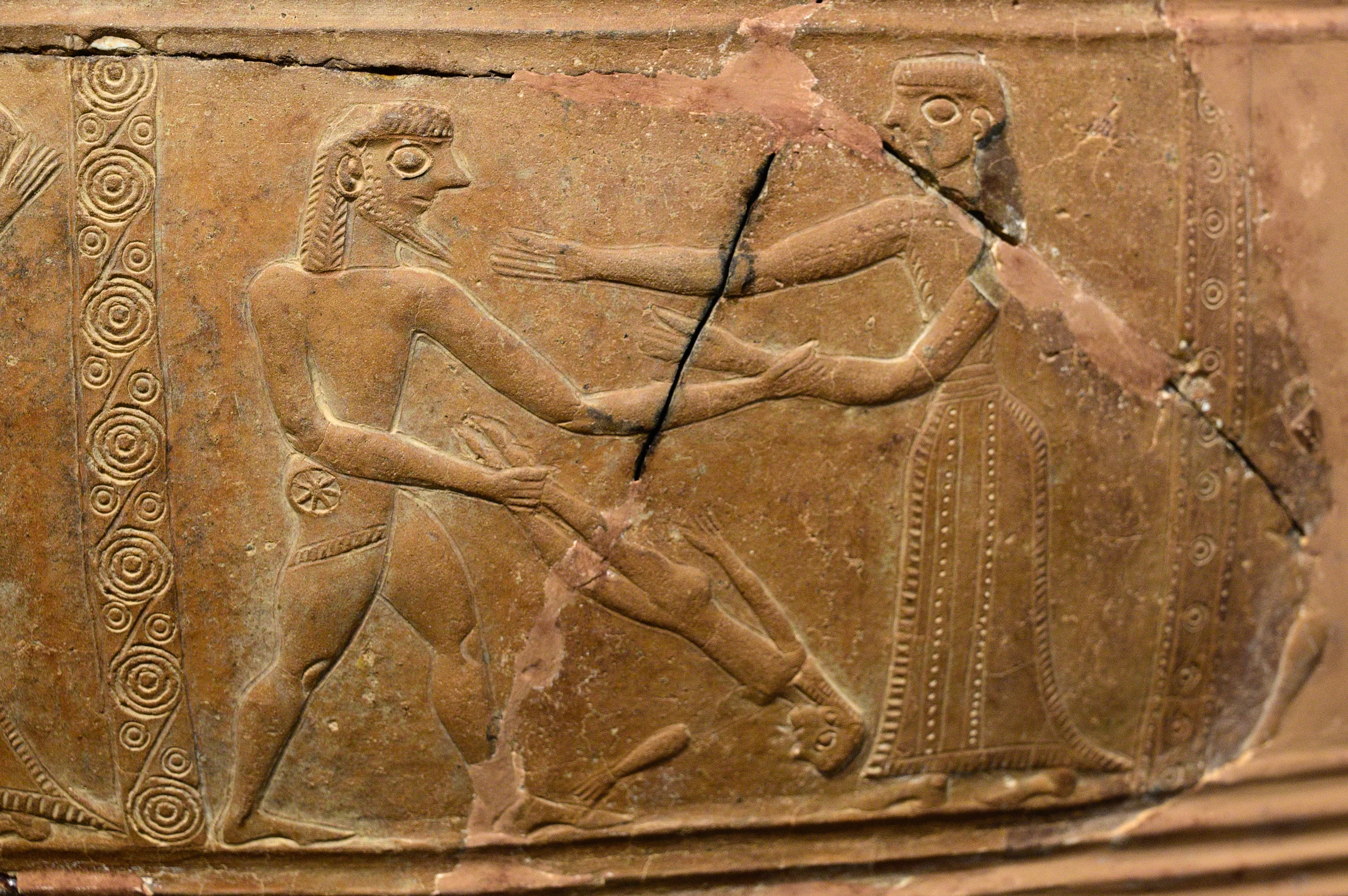
- The death of Astyanax from the Mykonos vase, circa 670s BCE
- Written: c. 7th century BCE
- Genre: Epic poetry
- Preceded by: Aethiopis
- Followed by: Iliupersis

The Little Iliad (Greek: Ἰλιὰς μικρά, Ilias mikra; Latin: parva Ilias) is a lost epic of ancient Greek literature. It was one of the Epic Cycle, that is, the Trojan cycle, which told the entire history of the Trojan War in epic verse. The story of the Little Iliad comes chronologically after that of the Aethiopis, and is followed by that of the Iliou persis ("Sack of Troy"). The Little Iliad was variously attributed by ancient writers to Lesches of Pyrrha (7th century BCE), Cinaethon of Sparta (8th century BCE), Diodorus of Erythrae, Thestorides of Phocaea, or Homer himself (8th century BCE) (see Cyclic poets). The poem comprised four books of verse in dactylic hexameter, the heroic meter.

== Date ==
The Little Iliad was probably composed in the latter half of the 7th century BCE, although there is much uncertainty. Ancient sources date Lesches to the 7th century BCE; but it is typical for ancient writers to place archaic literary authors earlier (sometimes centuries earlier) than the period they actually lived.

== Content ==
The Little Iliad is one of the better-attested epics in the Epic Cycle: nearly thirty lines of the original text survive. What is known today about the epic is almost entirely dependent on a summary of the Cyclic epics contained in the Chrestomatheia attributed to an unknown Proclus (possibly to be identified with the 2nd-century CE grammarian Eutychius Proclus). Numerous other references give indications of the poem's storyline.

The poem, "a fast-paced episodic epic with a lot of ground to cover" — which opened it to Aristotle's criticism that it had more plot than an epic should have — opens with the judgment of Achilles's arms, which are to be awarded to the greatest Greek hero: the contest is between Ajax and Odysseus, who recovered Achilles's body in battle. With the help of Athena, the arms are awarded to Odysseus, and Ajax goes insane and attacks the Achaeans' herd. Later, in shame, he commits suicide, and is buried without full heroic honours, in a coffin rather than cremated on a funeral pyre, "because of the anger of the king", Agamemnon.

Calchas, the Greek prophet, prophesies that the city of Troy will not fall unless the Greeks recover the arrows of Heracles from the hero Philoctetes, who was left behind on Lemnos when he was bitten by a poisonous snake. In accordance with this prophecy, Odysseus and Diomedes go to Lemnos to bring back Philoctetes, who is healed of his wound by Machaon. Philoctetes then fights Paris in single combat and kills him. After Paris's death, Helenus and Deiphobus fight over Helen. Deiphobus wins and marries her. The defeated Helenus angrily abandons Troy in spite and moves to Mount Ida.

Odysseus, who is a recurrent figure of interest in the Little Iliad, ambushes Helenus and captures him; Helenus then reveals three new prophecies concerning the preconditions for the Greeks' conquest of Troy, notably, that the city will not fall while it harbours the Palladium. The other two conditions are that the bones of Pelops are recovered from Pisa, a rival of Elis, and that Neoptolemus, son of Achilles, is brought into the war.

While a ship of Mycenaeans sail to Pisa to bring back the bones of Pelops, Odysseus brings Achilles's son Neoptolemus to Troy and gives him his father's armor. Achilles's ghost appears to him. When the Trojan ally Eurypylus dominates the field in battle, Neoptolemus kills him.

Odysseus and Diomedes go into Troy disguised as beggars, where Helen recognises them but keeps their secret; they return safely with the Palladium, killing some Trojans on the way.

On the goddess Athena's initiative, the Greek warrior Epeius builds the wooden horse, and the Greeks place their best warriors inside it, burn their camp, and withdraw to the nearby island Tenedos. The Trojans, believing that the Greeks have departed for good, breach a section of their city wall to bring the horse inside, and celebrate their apparent victory.

The emergence of the heroes from the horse, and the Greeks' destruction of Troy, seem not to be recounted in the Little Iliad, but are left for the Iliou persis. Nonetheless, a substantial fragment which is securely attributed to the Little Iliad describes how Neoptolemus takes Hector's wife Andromache captive and kills Hector's baby son, Astyanax, by throwing him from the walls of the city.

The Little Iliad does not seem to have been redacted in a single, authoritative version, according to varying accounts of its details that cannot securely be harmonised.

== Editions ==
- Online editions (English translation):
  - Fragments of the Little Iliad translated by H.G. Evelyn-White, 1914 (public domain)
  - Fragments of complete Epic Cycle translated by H.G. Evelyn-White, 1914; Project Gutenberg edition
  - Proclus' summary of the Epic Cycle translated by Gregory Nagy
- Print editions (Greek):
  - A. Bernabé 1987, Poetarum epicorum Graecorum testimonia et fragmenta pt. 1 (Leipzig: Teubner)
  - M. Davies 1988, Epicorum Graecorum fragmenta (Göttingen: Vandenhoek & Ruprecht)
- Print editions (Greek with English translation):
  - M.L. West 2003, Greek Epic Fragments (Cambridge, Massachusetts: Harvard University Press)
