= Aethiopis =

Lost Greek epic

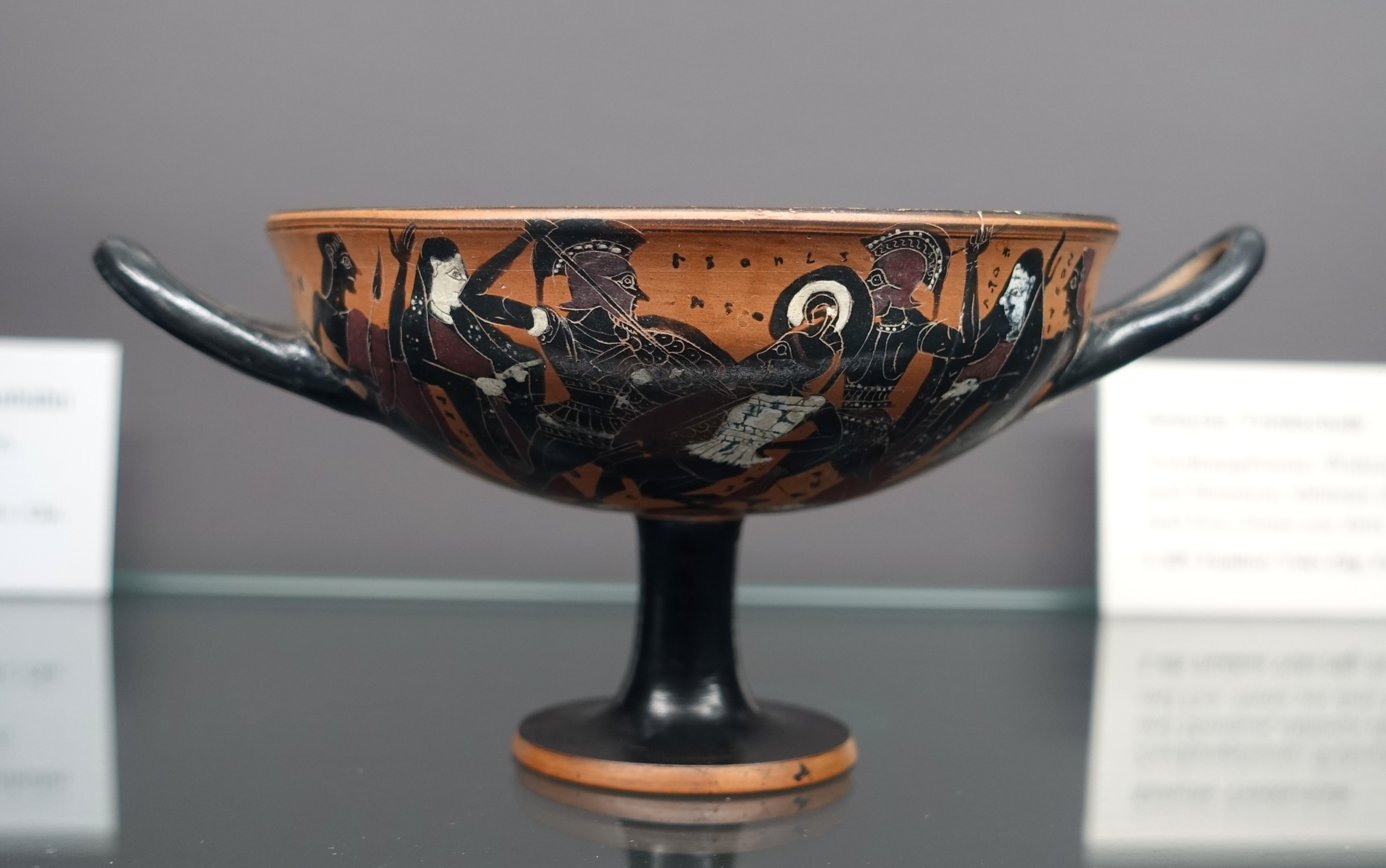
- Drinking bowl with scenes from the Aethiopis epic, Attic, c. 540 BC
- Genre: Epic poetry
- Preceded by: Iliad
- Followed by: Little Iliad

The Aithiopis (/iːˈθaɪəpɪs/; Ancient Greek: Αἰθιοπίς, romanized: Aithiopís), also spelled Aethiopis, is a lost epic of ancient Greek literature. It was one of the Epic Cycle, which told the entire history of the Trojan War in epic verse. The story of the Aethiopis lands chronologically after the Homeric Iliad, and could be followed by that of the Little Iliad. The Aethiopis was often attributed by ancient writers to Arctinus of Miletus who lived in the 8th century BC (see Cyclic poets). The poem comprised five books of verse in dactylic hexameter. Very few fragments of the Aethiopis survive today; Proclus's summary of the poem's contents establishes the narrative framework of the epic.

== Date ==
The Aethiopis was probably composed in the seventh century BC, but there is much uncertainty about its date. Ancient sources date Arctinus to the eighth century; but the earliest artistic representations of one of the most important characters, Penthesilea, date to about 600 BC, suggesting a much later date.

== Content ==
In current critical editions only five lines survive of the Aethiopis' original text. Current knowledge of the poem is almost entirely dependent on a summary of the Cyclic epics contained in the Chrestomathy attributed to an unknown Proclus (possibly to be identified with the 2nd-century AD grammarian Eutychius Proclus). Fewer than ten other references give indications of the poem's storyline.

According to Davies, Memnon as the helping warrior in the Aethiopis corresponds to Amazon Queen Penthesileia displaying a kind of symmetry in its plot: "two major allies come to help Priam and are killed by Achilles; these are Penthesileia, from the north, and Memnon, from the south, both (in strong contrast to the Trojan allies of the Iliad) dwelling in remote fantasy lands. It rather looks as if Penthesileia and Memnon were early conceived as a corresponding pair.

The poem opens shortly after the death of the Trojan hero Hector, with the arrival of the Amazon warrior Penthesilea who has come to support the Trojans. She has a moment of glory in battle, but Achilles kills her. The Greek warrior Thersites later taunts Achilles, claiming that he had been in love with her, and Achilles kills him too. Achilles is ritually purified for the murder of Thersites.

Next another Trojan ally arrives, Memnon, son of Eos and Tithonus, leading an Ethiopian contingent and wearing armour made by the god Hephaestus. In battle, Memnon kills Antilochus, a Greek warrior who was the son of Nestor and a great favourite of Achilles. Achilles then kills Memnon, and Zeus makes Memnon immortal at Eos' request. But in his rage Achilles pursues the Trojans into the very gates of Troy, and at the Scaean Gates he is killed by an arrow shot by Paris, assisted by the god Apollo. Achilles' body is rescued by Ajax and Odysseus.

The Greeks hold a funeral for Antilochus. Achilles's mother, the sea nymph Thetis, comes with her sisters and the Muses to lament over Achilles's body. Funeral games are held in honour of Achilles, at which his armor and weapons are offered as a prize for the greatest hero. A dispute over them develops between Ajax and Odysseus. There the Aethiopis ends; it is uncertain whether the judgment of Achilles' armor, and subsequent suicide of Ajax, were told in the Aethiopis, in the next epic in the Cycle, the Little Iliad, or in both.

== Importance of the poem ==
Events told in the story of the Aethiopis were popular among ancient Greek vase painters. Especially popular scenes are the death of Penthesilea, and Ajax's retrieval of Achilles' corpse.

Despite being poorly attested, the Aethiopis is frequently cited in modern scholarship on the Homeric Iliad. It is one of the most important paradigms used in Neoanalytic scholarship on Homer because of strong similarities between its story of Achilles, Antilochus, and Memnon, and the Iliadic story of Achilles, Patroclus, and Hector; the claim that such a similarity exists is known as the "Memnon theory".

== Editions ==
- Online editions (English translation):
  - Fragments of the Aethiopis translated by H.G. Evelyn-White, 1914 (public domain)
  - Fragments of complete Epic Cycle translated by H.G. Evelyn-White, 1914; Project Gutenberg edition
  - Proclus' summary of the Epic Cycle translated by Gregory Nagy
- Print editions (Greek):
  - A. Bernabé 1987, Poetarum epicorum Graecorum testimonia et fragmenta pt. 1 (Leipzig: Teubner)
  - M. Davies 1988, Epicorum Graecorum fragmenta (Göttingen: Vandenhoek & Ruprecht)
- Print editions (Greek with English translation):
  - M.L. West 2003, Greek Epic Fragments (Cambridge, Massachusetts: Harvard University Press)
