= Eutychius Proclus =

2nd-century Greek grammarian and writer

Eutychius Proclus (Ancient Greek: Εὐτύχιος Πρόκλος, Eutychios Proklos, or Tuticius Proculus in some sources) was a grammarian who flourished in the 2nd century AD. He served as one of two Latin tutors for the Roman emperor Marcus Aurelius, along with Trosius Aper. He was from the North African city of Sicca Veneria (modern El Kef in Tunisia).

It is possibly this Proclus who is mentioned by Trebellius Pollio as the most learned grammarian of his age.

For his work with the emperor, Proculus was later given senatorial rank, and a consulship, though it is not clear what year he served as consul. He also required financial support from Marcus in order to carry the financial burdens of a senatorial career, so from here we may assume he was not born into a wealthy or aristocratic family.

== Works ==
His writings are now lost, though there is a (probably fictitious) work occasionally attributed to him titled De peregrinis regionibus. This is likely because of some of the confusion over his identity.

Some scholars through the 19th century believed that he was to be identified with the author of a Chrestomathy which is our most important source of information on the Epic Cycle. Most modern scholars consider this attribution likely incorrect however, as this was a Greek work and Eutychius Proclus was a grammarian of Latin.

== Identity ==
There was historically some confusion over his identity based on earlier scholarship. Raffaello Maffei, the Italian historian and humanist of the 15th and 16th centuries, published information about Proculus in his Commentariorum rerum urbanarum libri XXXVIII, which was a historical source for many later writers. The work itself was quite unreliable in many places. Maffei identifies the 5th-century Platonist philosopher Proclus with "Tuticius Proculus", even though the two men lived three centuries apart, and states that the philosopher was the one who was Aurelius's tutor. Numerous other confusions stemmed from this error, including attribution of works not actually authored by him, and many later writers made similar errors based on Maffei's writings.

As to his name, scholar Anthony Birley has suggested that the name "Eutychius" is actually a corruption of the text, and in all cases should properly read "Tuticius".

We have an inscription from El Kef that mentions a "Marcus Tuticius Proculus" as procurator Augusti (that is, financial procurator, or CFO of a Roman province). This could be the same man, or a relative.
