= Lesches =

Ancient Greek poet

Lesches (Ancient Greek: Λέσχης) is a semi-legendary early Greek poet and the reputed author of the Little Iliad. According to the usually accepted tradition, he was a native of Pyrrha in Lesbos, and flourished about 660 BC (others place him about 50 years earlier). Proclus refers to him as "Lesches of Mytilene". Mytilene and Lesbos are names of the same Greek island used interchangeably.

The lost epic Little Iliad, in four books, was commonly attributed to Lesches. It took up the story of the Homeric Iliad, and, beginning with the contest between Telamonian Ajax and Odysseus for the arms of Achilles, carried it down to the feast of the Trojans over the captured Trojan Horse, according to the epitome in Proclus, or to the Fall of Troy, according to Aristotle. Some ancient authorities ascribe the work to a Spartan named Cinaethon, and even to Homer.

== Sources ==
- Georg Heinrich Bode, Geschichte der Hellenischen Dichtkunst, i.
- Karl Otfried Müller and John William Donaldson, History of Greek Literature, i. ch. 6
- Friedrich Gottlieb Welcker, Der epische Cyclus (1865-1882)
