= Tryphiodorus =

3rd or 4th century Egyptian epic poet

Tryphiodorus (Ancient Greek: Τρυφιόδωρος, romanized: Tryphiodoros; fl. 3rd or 4th century AD) was an epic poet from Panopolis (today Akhmim), Egypt. His only surviving work is The Sack of Troy, an epic poem in 691 verses. Other recorded titles include Marathoniaca and The Story of Hippodamea.

During his lifetime he was known as Triphiodorus (Τριφιόδωρος, Triphiodoros, 'gift of Triphis' [a local god of Akhim]). The confusion between the two spellings occurred already in the sixth century AD through widespread confusion of the pronunciation of i/y. A false etymology claims spelling "Tryphiodorus" is based on the Greek word "truphē," meaning "luxury" or "extravagance".

== Life ==
There is little known about the life of Triphiodorus other than two entries in the Byzantine encyclopedia the Suda (T 1111 and 1112), thought to refer to the same individual. The Suda provides his place of birth, that he was a grammarian and epic poet, but not when he lived. Traditionally he was dated to the fifth century because he was thought to imitate the Dionysiaca of Nonnus of Panopolis (then dated to the fourth or fifth century), and he was in his turn imitated by Coluthus (he lived under emperor Anastasius I). However, the publication in the 1970s of a fragment of papyrus from Oxyrhynchus (P. Oxy. 41.2946), containing lines 391-402 of The Sack of Troy and dated to the third or early fourth century, has made most scholars place him in the third century (see the editions of Livrea, Gerlaud and Dubielzig).

Triphiodorus' pagan name cannot be considered proof that he was a pagan, and nothing in his poem allows us to call him a Christian: the reference in lines 604–5 to children paying with their lives for the sins of their parents is not decisive, having classical parallels such as Homer's Iliad 3.298-301.

== Writings ==
=== The Taking of Ilios ===
Triphiodorus' only extant work is The Sack of Troy, a 691-verse epic poem, narrating events from the capture of the Trojan seer Helenus to the sailing of the Greek troops after the capture of Troy.

The poem begins with an invocation to Calliope, the Muse of epic poetry (lines 1–5). The narrative is introduced with a summary of the dire situation of the troops of the Greeks and Trojans (lines 6-39): both are mined by the tiredness of years of fighting and heavy casualties. Then the Greeks capture the Trojan seer and following his advice call Neoptolemus (Achilles’ son) to join their lines and steal the Palladion from Troy (lines 40–56). The construction of the Trojan Horse follows and Triphiodorus gives a long description (lines 57–107). The Greeks have an assembly in which Odysseus convinces the most brave fighters to hide with him in the horse and the rest of the troops to pretend they are fleeing from Troy, while preparing to come back the following night (108–234). The following morning the Trojans discover the disappearance of the Achaean army, inspect their camp and admire the Wooden Horse (235–57). Sinon appears before them covered in blood and convinces Priam to take the horse into their citadel to win Athena's attention and avoid her helping the Greeks to return (258–303). The Trojans transport the horse and break the otherwise indestructible walls of Troy to bring it into their citadel (304–57). Cassandra tries to make them come into their senses but Priam has her imprisoned (358–443). While they are celebrating the end of the war, Aphrodite tells Helen to join Menelaus (who is hiding in the horse). Helen goes to the temple of Athena where the horse is kept and calls the names of the wives of the hidden heroes, so as to tempt them to come out. Odysseus strangles the warrior Anticlus, who is about to give in, while Athena orders Helen to go to her room and light a torch to call the Greek fleet back to Troy for the final battle (454-98a). While the Trojans are overcome by a deep slumber, the gods abandon Troy and Helen and Sinon light torches to guide the return of the Greek fleet (498b-521). The fleet arrives and the hidden warriors leave the horse, giving start to a long night of fighting, full of dramatic episodes (506–663). The poet then decides to put a stop to the narrative and conclude (664–7). The poem finishes with the a brief description of how at the beginning of the new day, the victors check for survivors and booty, set Troy on fire, sacrifice Polyxena to appease the spirit of Achilles, distribute the booty and leave for good (668–91).

"The Achaeans poured the blood of Polyxena over the tomb of dead Achilles to propitiate his wrath, and took each his lot of Trojan women and divided all their other spoil, both gold and silver: wherewith they loaded their deep ships and through the booming sea set sail from Troy, having made an end of the war."
The Taking of Ilios

The Sack of Troy can be considered part of a late antique vogue for mythological epic, which includes the Posthomerica by Quintus of Smyrna (third century AD), the Dionysiaca by Nonnus of Panopolis (mid fifth c. AD), the Rape of Helen (by Colluthus) and the Description of the Statues in the Baths of Zeuxippus by Christodorus (early sixth century, transmitted as book 2 of the Palatine Anthology).

In this poem Triphiodorus shows a deep understanding of Homer and the grammatical tradition of interpretation of the Homeric poems (e.g. in lines 60-1 he shows that he knows about the editorial tradition of Homer Iliad 5.62-4). He quotes Hesiod (especially Triph. 136–8, after Hes. Op. 57–8) and Pindar (Triph. 643, after Pi. N. 7.42), Hellenistic poetry (e.g. Triph. 318–35, after AR 1.362-90). His portrayal of Cassandra is reminiscent of Aeschylus in his Agamemnon and Euripides in Trojan Women.

Regarding a possible influence of Virgil Aeneid 2, there are some glaring differences between the two accounts of the end of Troy: Virgil develops the character of Laocoön (A. 2.40-56, 199–231), and only mentions Cassandra (246–7), while Triphiodorus focuses on Cassandra (358–443) and does not mention Laocoön. On the contrary, Virgil and Triphiodorus are particularly close in the treatment of the figure of Sinon, in particular in their speeches (compare Aeneid 2.76-96, 103–4, 189–94, and Triph. 265–82, 292–303).

=== Other works ===
Besides The Sack of Troy, the entries of the Suda (T 1111 and 1112) attribute to Triphiodorus two more poems: Marathoniaca (Μαραθωνιακά), probably narrating how Theseus defeated the bull of Marathon; a Story of Hippodamea (Τὰ κατὰ Ἱπποδάμειαν), on one of the females of this name (e.g. the daughter of King Oenomaus, who killed all her suitors in a chariot race until Pelops defeated him). The Suda also mentions two grammatical works: the Lipogrammatic Odyssey (probably a re-writing of the Odyssey suppressing a letter in each of the books: α in book 1, β in book 2 and so on) and a Paraphrase of Homer’s Comparisons (Παράφρασις τῶν Ὁμήρου παραβόλων), a study of the long comparisons in the Homeric poems (since παραβολή is a long simile).

== Impact and contribution ==
The influence of Triphiodorus has been detected in the Dionysiaca of Nonnus of Panopolis (e.g. Nonn. D. 25.306, after Triph. 14), Coluthus’ Rape of Helen (e.g. Colut. 195–8, after Triph. 56–61), Musaeus’ Hero and Leander (e.g. Musae. 140, after Triph. 32) and Paul the Silentiary (e.g. Descr. Soph. 283, after Triph. 631).

== Bibliography ==
Bibliographical record updated to July 2012: https://sites.google.com/site/hellenisticbibliography/empire/triphiodorus

- Mair, W. A. transl., Oppian, Colluthus, Tryphiodorus (Loeb Classical Library Cambridge: Harvard University Press, 1958) ISBN 0-674-99241-5
- Giuseppe Giangrande, Review: Tryphiodorus (The Classical Review, The New Series, Vol. 15, No. 3 Dec., 1965), pp. 282–283
- Smith, William, Dictionary of Greek and Roman Biography and Mythology (Walton & Maberly, 1859), pp. 1177–1178
- Knight, J.F.W., Iliupersides (The Classical Journal, Vol. 26, No. 3/4 Jul. - Oct., 1932), pp. 178–189
- Jones, W. J. Jr., Trojan Legend: Who is Sinon? (The Classical Journal, Vol. 61, No.3 Dec., 1965), pp. 122–128
- M. Campbell (1985), Lexicon in Triphiodorum, Hildesheim
- F. J. Cuartero Iborra (1988), Trifiodor, La Presa de Troia, Barcelona
- U. Dubielzig (1996), Triphiodor, Die Einnahme Ilions, Tübingen
- B. Gerlaud (1982), Triphiodore, La Prise d’Ilion, Paris
- Enrico Livrea (1982), Triphiodorus, Ilii excidium, Leipzig
- Laura Miguélez Cavero (2013), Triphiodorus, The Sack of Troy: A General Introduction and a Commentary, Berlin
