= To Her Inconstant Lover =

16th-century poem

Isabella Whitney's 16th-century poem "To her unconstant Lover" is the first in her first book The Copy of a Letter, Lately Written in Meter by a Young Gentlewoman: to her Unconstant Lover (1567). The speaker is Whitney herself, who is, as the title of the poem indicates, writing to her unfaithful, or inconstant lover.

== Upcoming marriage of Whitney's lover ==
Whitney begins by telling her lover that she has learned he is going to be married, despite his secrecy: "as close as you your wedding kept". Whitney alternates between speaking as the jilted lover, reminding him what he is missing out on by abandoning her, and acting as a kind of counselor. Whitney tells him, "you know I alwayes wisht you wel", and hopes that God will send him a "good wyfe"; however, she suggests that if he wanted her back, he could have her.

== Allusions to Greek mythology ==
Whitney notes numerous treacherous men from Greek mythology, including Sinon (who persuaded the Trojans to bring the Trojan horse into the city, thus causing the downfall of Troy), Aeneas (who abandons his lover Dido), Theseus (who deserted Ariadne), and Jason (who abandoned Medea, after she saves his life on countless occasions).

Whitney encourages her lover to be not like these men, but like Troilus, who faithfully died loving Criseyde. After Whitney makes her list of unfaithful men, she addresses the virtues she hopes her lover's wife will have, so that he does not regret his decision.

She hopes this wife will have: the beauty of Helen, the chastity of Penelope, the constancy of Lucres, and the true love of Thisbe. Whitney tells her lover that aside from Helen's beauty, she possesses all of these qualities, she only wishes she had Cassandra's gift of prophecy so she could see whether he ends up misfortunate, or she does.

== Relationship advice to her lover ==
Although Whitney clearly feels abandoned, she takes the moral high ground by wishing her lover the best, and offering him relationship advice. She completes her poem, or letter, as a morally virtuous woman, and not a victim.
