= Christodorus (disambiguation) =

Christodorus or Christodoros (Greek: Χριστόδωρος) may refer to:

- Christodorus of Coptos, a Greek epic poet from Coptos in Egypt, flourished during the reign of Anastasius I (491–518).
- Christodoros of Thebes, a Greek poet and an epigrammatist from Thebes, Egypt who lived during the late 1st century BC or early 1st century AD
