= Mykonos vase =

Ancient Greek artifact

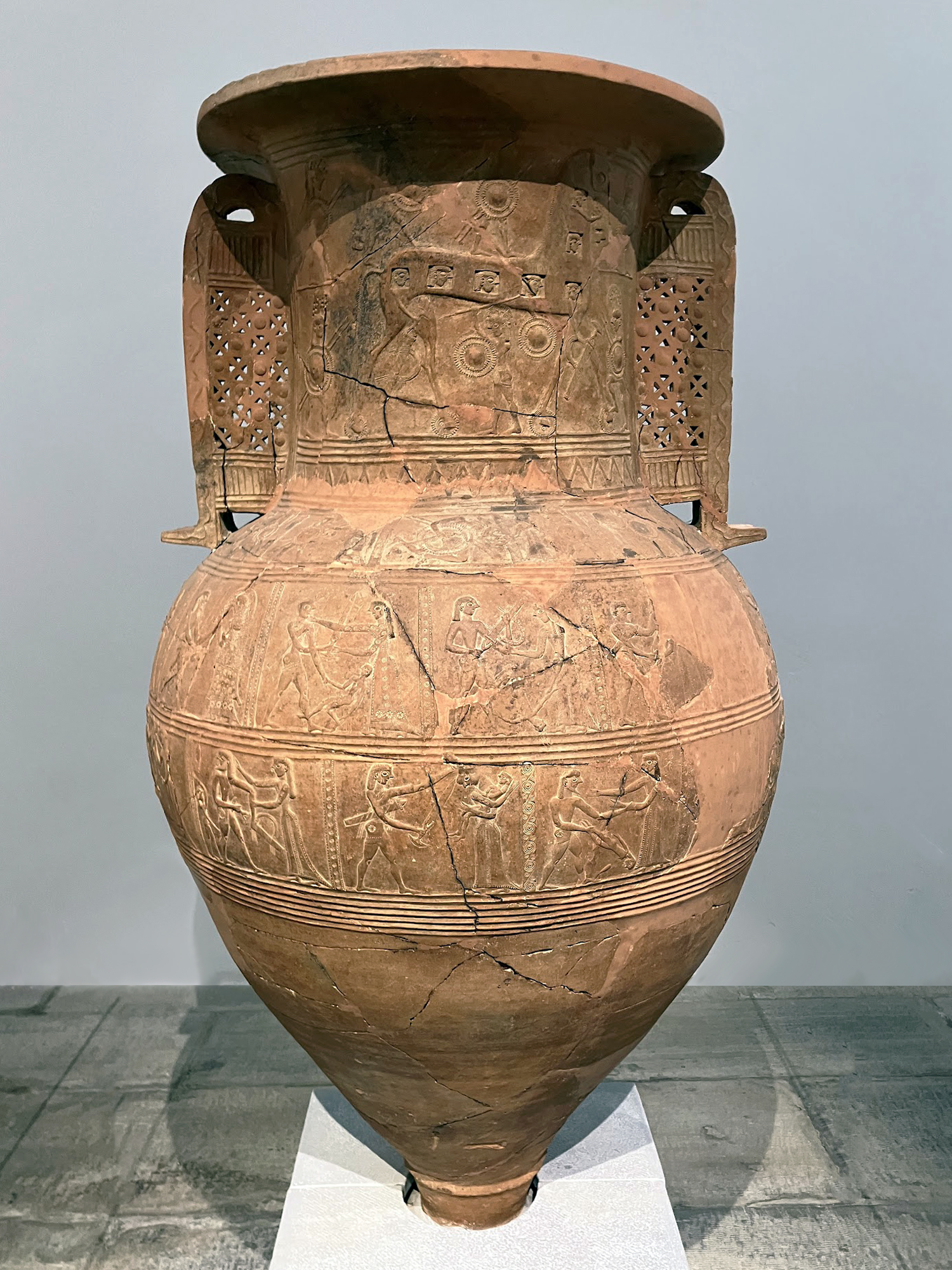
Pithos 2240 on display at the Archaeological Museum of Mykonos

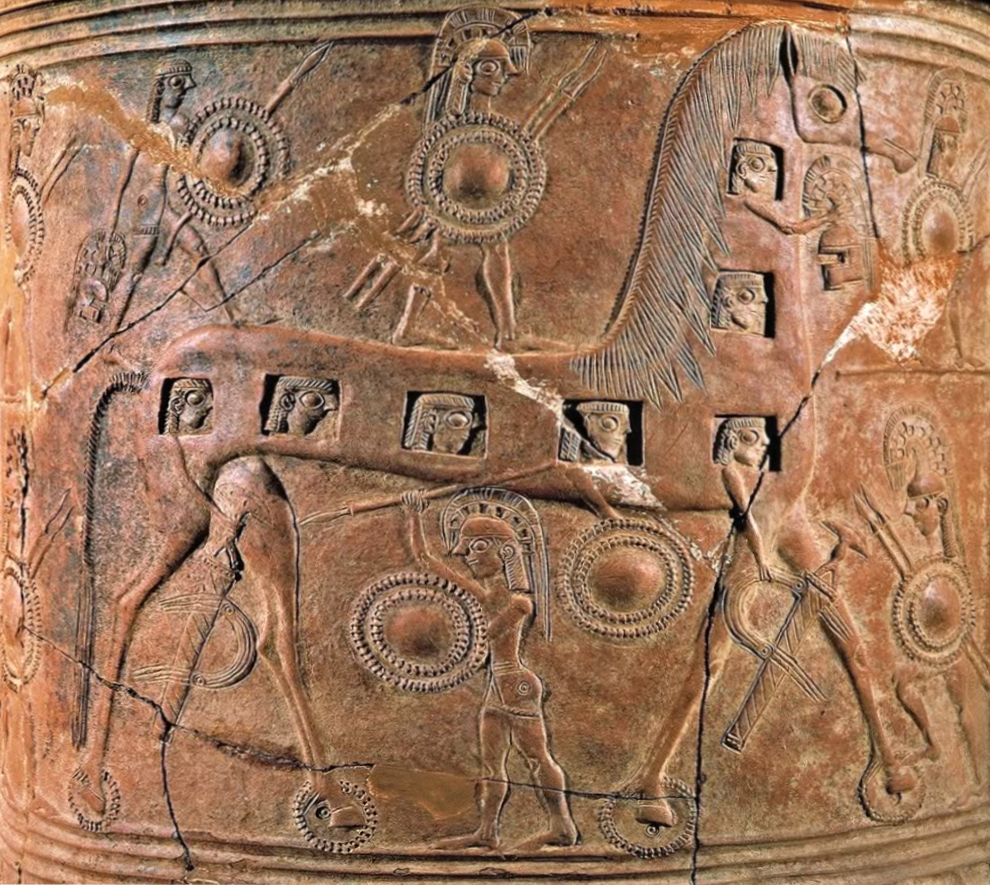
Detail showing the oldest-known depiction of the Trojan Horse. (Note the warriors peeking out through portholes in the horse's side.)

The Mykonos vase (Pithos 2240) is a pithos, a large ceramic storage jar, of c. 675 BC in the Archaic period in Greece, decorated with scenes of the sack of Troy during the Trojan War. It is one of the earliest objects to depict the Trojan Horse. It was found with human bones inside on the Greek island of Mykonos by a local inhabitant. The pithos is on display at the Archaeological Museum of Mykonos.

== Description ==
The neck of the pithos portrays the moment when the Trojan Horse is surrounded by Greek warriors, with additional warriors seen in the portholes. Beneath it there are three lines of metopes, each containing figures poised in battle. The lower part of the vase is blank.

The warriors that surround the horse are represented in a formulaic manner. Their heads and legs appear behind rounded bossed shields and they carry spears. Those presented on the upper metope are portrayed in a similar fashion. However, the warriors on the main body of the pithos do not carry shields and can be seen assailing women and children who face them. The women have thick manes of hair and expressive hand gestures.

Two factors confirm that the Mykonos vase depicts the sack of Troy: the depiction of the wooden horse on the neck of the vase, and the individual scenes of slaughter that accompany it. They dominate the pithos, showing warriors in the portholes of the Trojan Horse – a preview of what the horse holds in store – as well as warriors in action on the ground.

In this piece, the artist chose to present the battle in the city of Troy as a battle against defenseless women and children, there are no Trojan warriors present on the pithos. The artist's decision to separate the scenes of slaughter and link them with the cunning trick of the Trojan Horse serves as a way of focusing the attention of the viewer on the cold bloodedness of the sack of the city and the way the slaughter in the city differed from the fighting on the front lines.

There are three metopes that stand out in the pithos. At the far right of the middle row, there is a lone warrior drawing his sword and advancing. At the far left panel is a lone woman, clasping her hands to her breast. The third metope, located directly below the horse in the center of the panels, depicts a single warrior that has been stabbed in the neck, crumpled over his shield while his right hand grasps for his scabbard. Amid the violence, we are presented with three single figures, two of which are not yet caught up in action but able to contemplate, and one lone dead warrior post-action. The depiction of single figures emphasizes the personal experience of violence. It is unknown whether the dead warrior is Greek or Trojan, but perhaps the artist's placement of the figure in the center was his/her way of pointing out that it did not matter which side he was on – his fate was still the same.

The Mykonos vase alludes to stories within stories, but precludes any easy stringing of the episodes together. The vase also plays with viewpoint: it entices the viewer to look through the portholes of the horse and presents the sack of Troy as slaughter of the defenseless, evoking sympathy for victims of war.

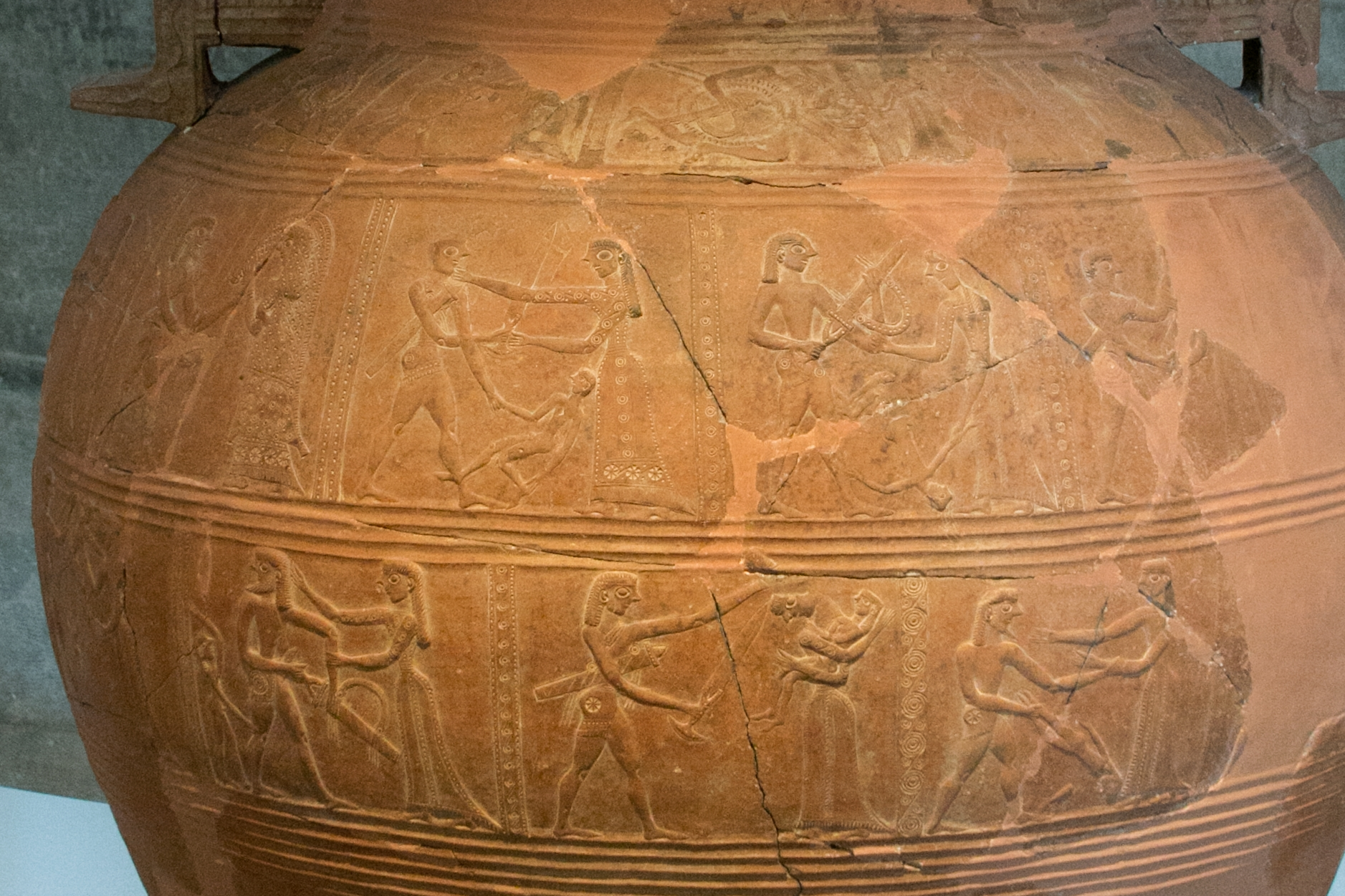

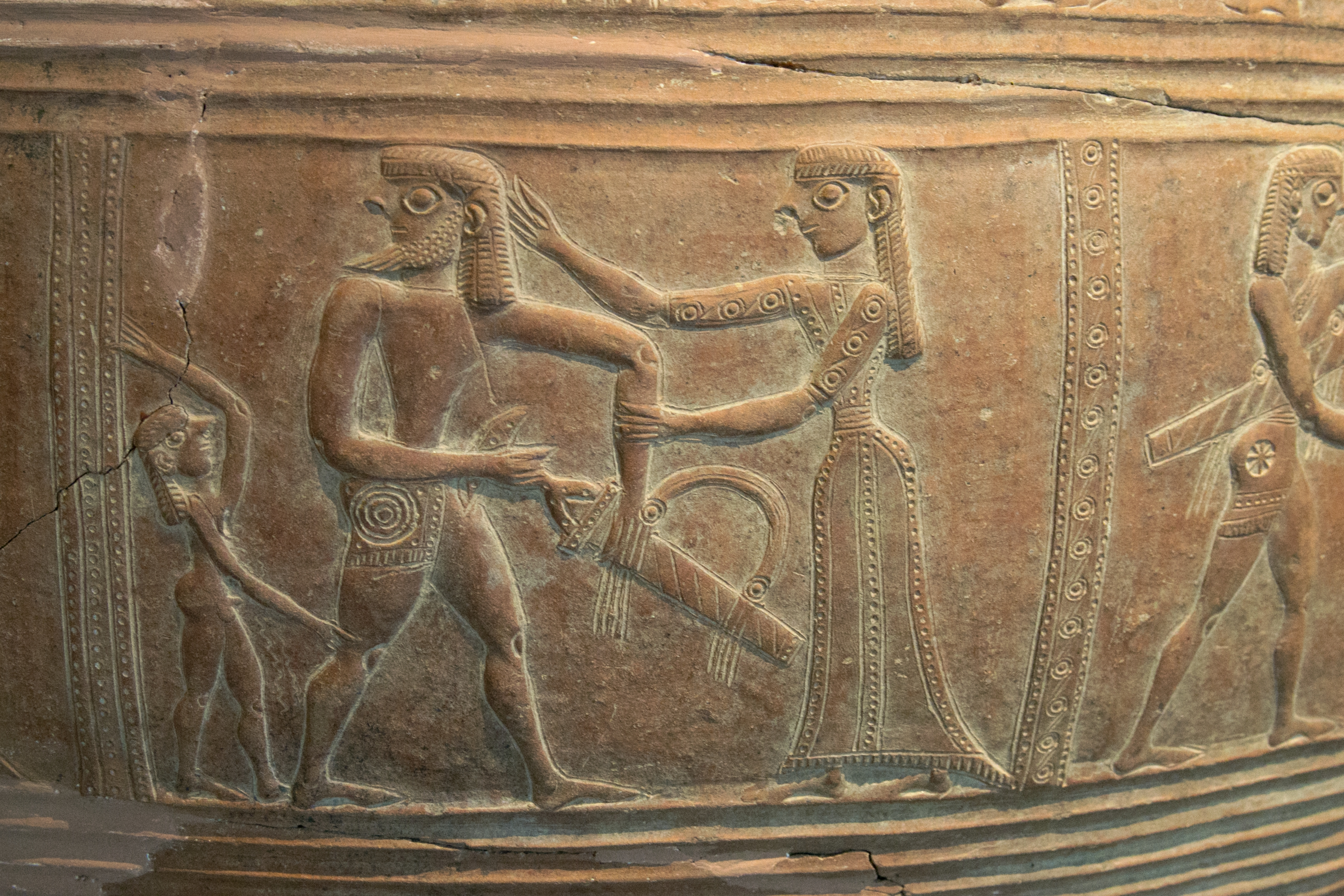

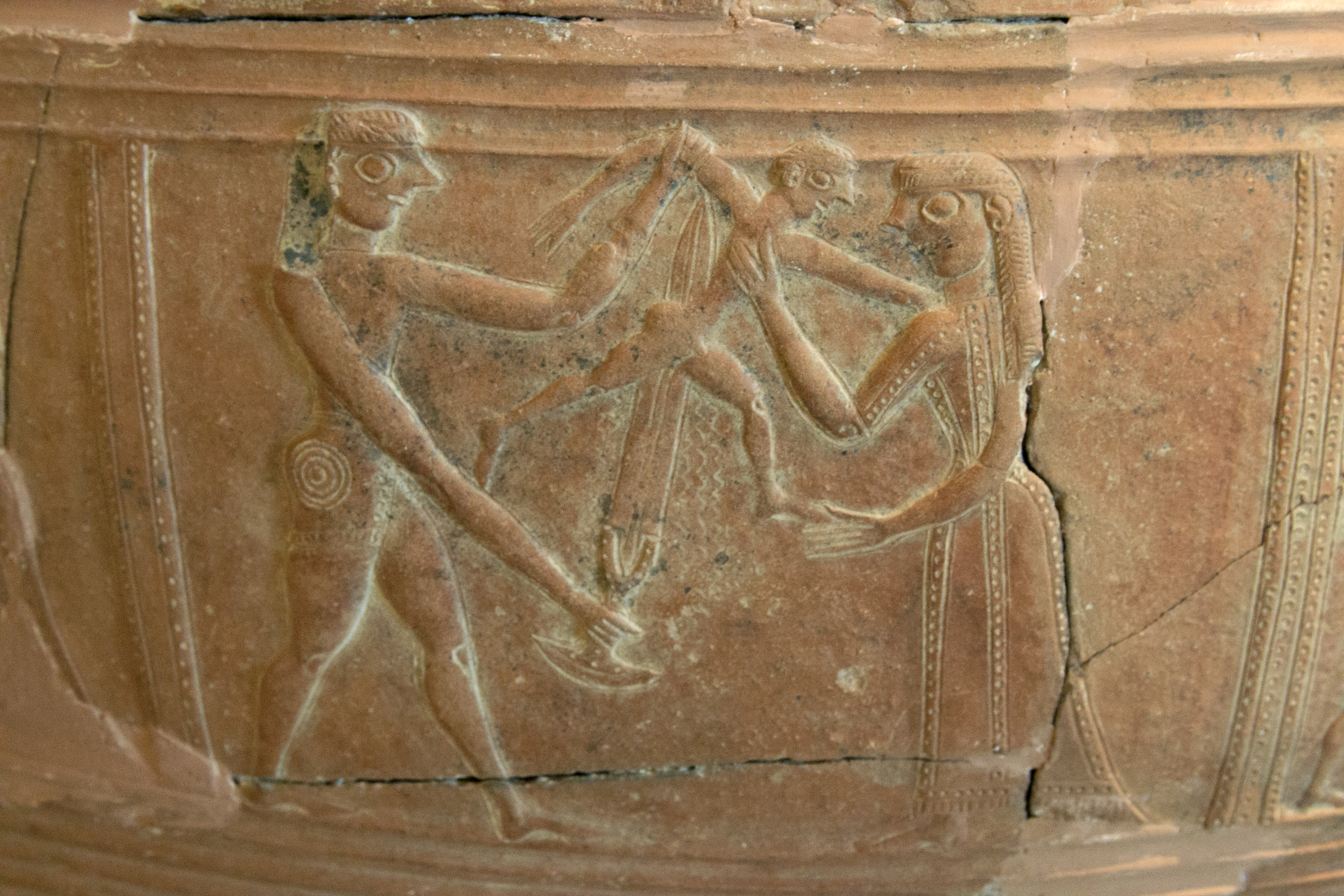

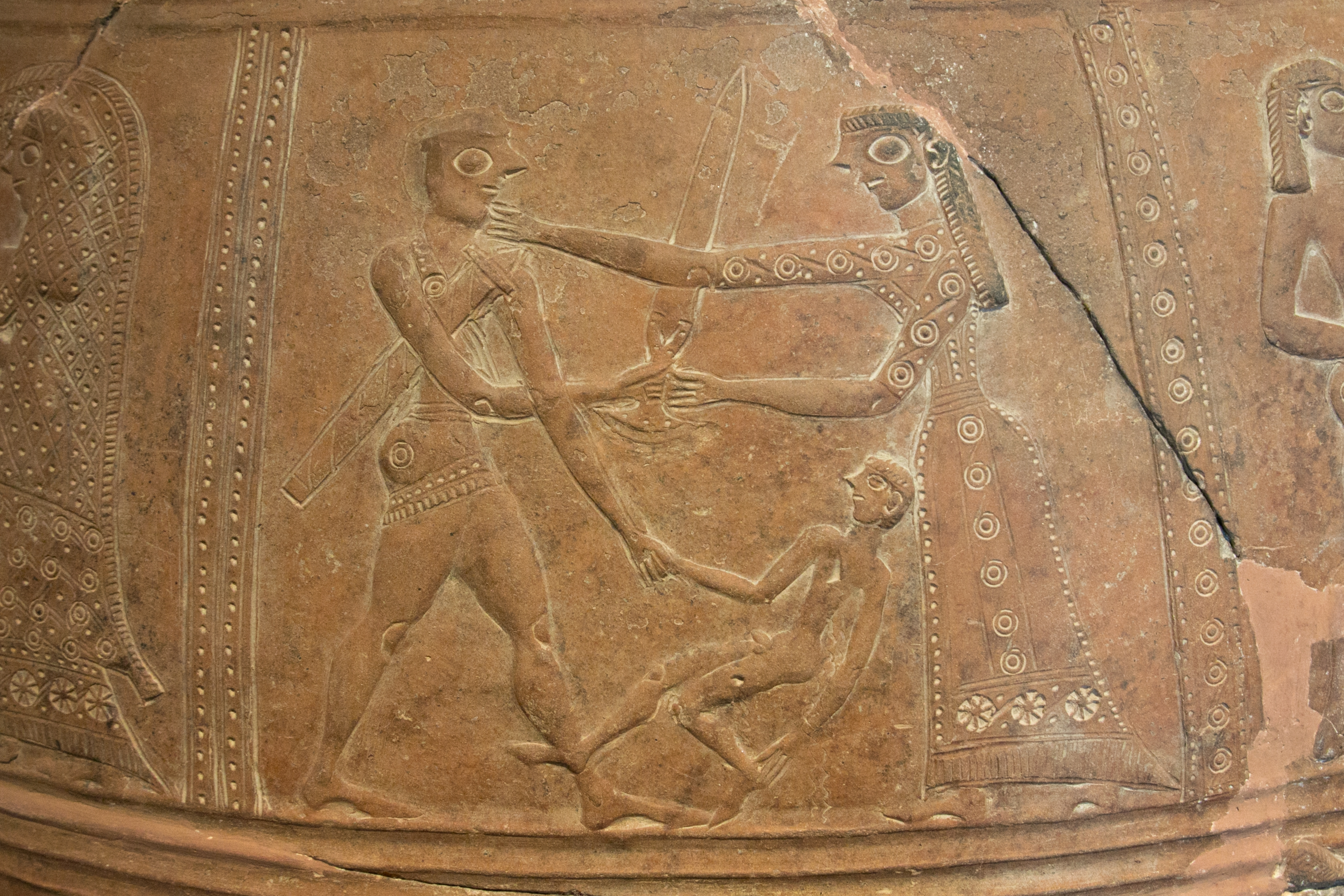

== Bibliography ==
- Michael John Anderson, The Fall of Troy in Early Greek Poetry and Art, 1997.
- Miriam Ervin Caskey, "Notes on Relief Pithoi of the Tenian-Boiotian Group", AJA, 80, 1976, pp. 19–41.
- M. Ervin, "A Relief Pithos from Mykonos", Deltion, 18, 1963, 37-75.
- J.M. Hurwit, The Art and Culture of Early Greece, 1100-480 B.C, 1985
- M. Wood, In Search of the Trojan War, 1985.
- The End of the Trojan War; Orestes and Odysseus, by University of Wisconsin–Milwaukee
