= Baths of Zeuxippus =

Public baths in Constantinople

Coordinates: 41°00′23″N 28°58′33″E

The Baths of Zeuxippus were popular public baths in the city of Constantinople. The origin of their name was disputed already in antiquity and could go back either to the god Zeus or to the artist Zeuxis. Constructed between 100 and 200, the Baths of Zeuxippus were destroyed during the Nika revolt of 532 and then rebuilt several years later. They were famed primarily for the many statues inside them, representing prominent individuals from history and mythology.

== Location ==
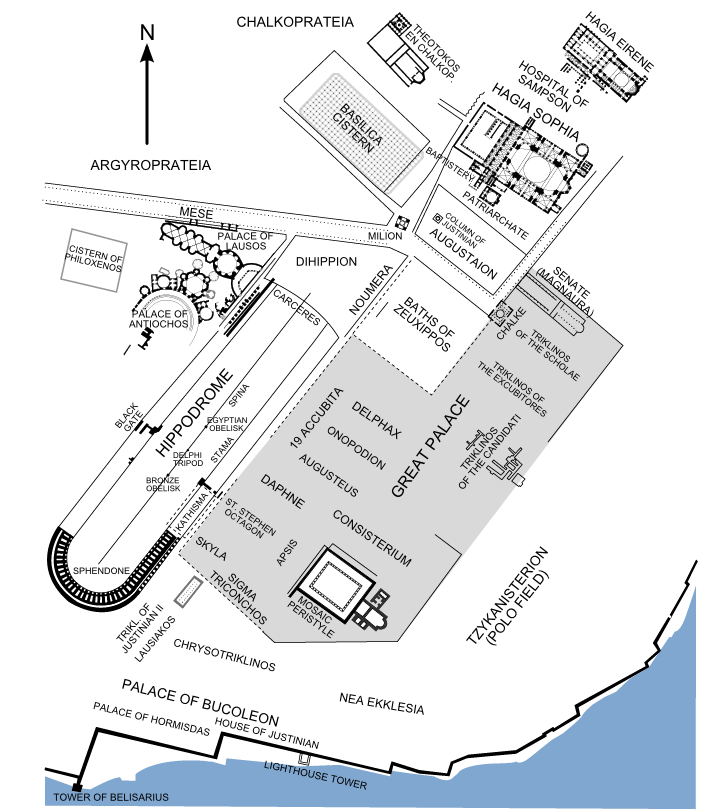
Map showing the hippodrome and the Palace quarter, close to the Baths of Zeuxippus.

The Zeuxippus Baths were located north of the Great Palace of Constantinople between the Augustaion and the north-east corner of the Hippodrome. This suggests their great popularity, since such a significant location would have attracted many people. The Baths were also close to the square of the Augustaeum and the basilica of Hagia Sophia.

The 12th-century scholar Zonaras claimed that Septimius Severus had connected the baths to the Hippodrome. However, Leontius, who was generally more accurate in his writings (which also predated those of Zonaras), asserted that the baths were not actually connected to the Hippodrome, but were simply close to it:

Between Zeuxippus' cool refreshing baths,

And the famed Hippodrome's swift course I stand.
Let the spectator, where he bathes himself
Or sees the struggling steed panting for breath
Pay a kind visit, to enhance his pleasures;
He'll find a hearty welcome at my table.
Or if more manly sports his mind affects,

Practice the rough diversions of the stadia.

The map to the right shows the Baths' approximate location within Constantinople, as determined by excavations. As can be seen, the Baths were roughly rectangular in shape, and were very close to, or even "connected" to the Palace, as Zonaras indicated.

== Description ==
The original baths, founded and built by Septimius Severus, were enlarged and decorated under Constantine I. They were adorned with numerous mosaics, paintings and colourful marble as well as with over eighty statues, depicting historical figures such as Homer, Hesiod, Plato, Aristotle, Julius Caesar, Demosthenes, Aeschines and Virgil, as well as gods and mythological heroes. Whether the statues were newly produced or, as is often assumed, brought to Constantinople from various parts of the Roman Empire (especially Greece) cannot be determined with certainty. The decor of the Baths followed an architectural trend of the period; the Forum of Constantine, its adjacent Senate house, and the Palace of Lausus were adorned with similar statue galleries of heroes (mythological and not), historical figures and powerful people.

For a relatively small fee, any member of the public could gain admission to the bath complex. Although it was primarily used for public bathing, people could also exercise and enjoy a variety of recreational activities there. Attendants were paid to oversee the activities, enforcing opening and closing times and the rules of conduct. Men and women were not allowed to bathe together; they would either use separate baths, or bathe at different times of day.

Constantinople offered numerous bathhouses to its citizens, but the Baths of Zeuxippus seem to have been particularly popular, according to several mentions in the ancient sources. Even monks and members of the clergy could be seen there, despite the insistence of their superiors that the baths were places of impious behaviour.

== Destruction and later use ==
As a result of the Nika revolt of 532 - the worst uprising Constantinople had seen, which left half the city in ruins and thousands of people dead - the original Baths of Zeuxippus were destroyed in a fire. Justinian rebuilt the complex and also organised new statues, but he could not recreate or restore the famous statues of the former decoration or the other antiquities that were lost.

In the early 7th century, as a result of military and political pressure on the Byzantine Empire, public bathing changed from being a common luxury to a rare and infrequent one, and many public facilities and venues began to be used instead by the military. The last reference to the Baths of Zeuxippus being used for bathing occurred in 713, after which they were converted to other uses. Part of the bathhouse became a prison known as Noumera, while another part appears to have been used as a silk workshop.

Almost 1,000 years later, in 1556, the Ottoman architect Mimar Sinan built the Haseki Hürrem Sultan Hamamı on the same grounds. In the 1460s, parts of the Zeuxippus Baths had been reused for the construction of the Fatih Mosque.

In 1927–1928, excavations on the site recovered many historical relics, such as earthenware and glazed pottery, which provided unique insights into the architectural designs and social interests of Constantinople.

== In literature ==
Christodorus of Coptus, an Egyptian poet and writer living around 500 AD, wrote a lengthy (over 400 lines long) hexameter poem inspired by the statues adorning the Baths of Zeuxippus. The poem consisted of a number of short epigrams (six in total), each focusing on one or a small group of the statues, that were designed to form one work. While it has been suggested that these epigrams might have been inscribed on the bases of the statues themselves, this is unlikely because of his use of the ekphrastic medium, and the presence of the past tense in the text.

Christodoros' description was confirmed during the partial excavation of the baths by the discovery of two statue bases whose inscriptions mention two figures ("Hekabe" and "Aischenes") actually mentioned in his poem.

== Sources ==
- Franz Alto Bauer Stadt, Platz und Denkmal in der Spätantike. Untersuchungen zur Ausstattung des öffentlichen Raums in den spätantiken Städten Rom, Konstantinopel und Ephesos. Philipp von Zabern, 1996.
- Alessandra Bravi Griechische Kunstwerke im politischen Leben Roms und Konstantinopels. Walter de Gruyter, 2014. ISBN 978-3-05-006458-1
- Stephan Busch Versus balnearum. Die antike Dichtung über Bäder und Baden im römischen Reich. B. G. Teubner, 1999. ISBN 3-519-07256-4.
- J. A. S. Evans The Age of Justinian. ISBN 0-415-02209-6
- Edward Gibbon The History of the Decline and Fall of the Roman Empire. Penguin Classics, 1995. ISBN 0-14-043394-5
- Pierre Gilles The Antiquities of Constantinople. Italica Press, Incorporated, 1998. ISBN 0-934977-01-1.
- Vera Hell Istanbul und Umgebung. Kunst- und Reiseführer. W. Kohlhammer, 1978.
- Scott Fitzgerald Johnson Greek Literature in Late Antiquity: Dynamism Didacticism Classicism Ashgate Publishing, Ltd., 2006. ISBN 0-7546-5683-7
- Kazhdan, Alexander, ed. (1991), Oxford Dictionary of Byzantium, Oxford University Press, ISBN 978-0-19-504652-6
- Marcus Louis Rautman Daily Life in the Byzantine Empire. Greenwood Press, 2006. ISBN 0-313-32437-9
- Stupperich, Reinhard (1982). "Das Statuenprogramm in den Zeuxippos-Thermen. Überlegungen zur Beschreibung durch Christodoros von Koptos". Istanbuler Mitteilungen. 32: 210–235.
- Bryan Ward-Perkins The Cambridge Ancient History: Empire and Successors, A.D. 425-600. Cambridge University Press, 2000.
