= Archaeological Museum of Mykonos =

Coordinates: 37.4500°N 25.3297°E

- Αρχαιολογικό Μουσείο Μυκόνου
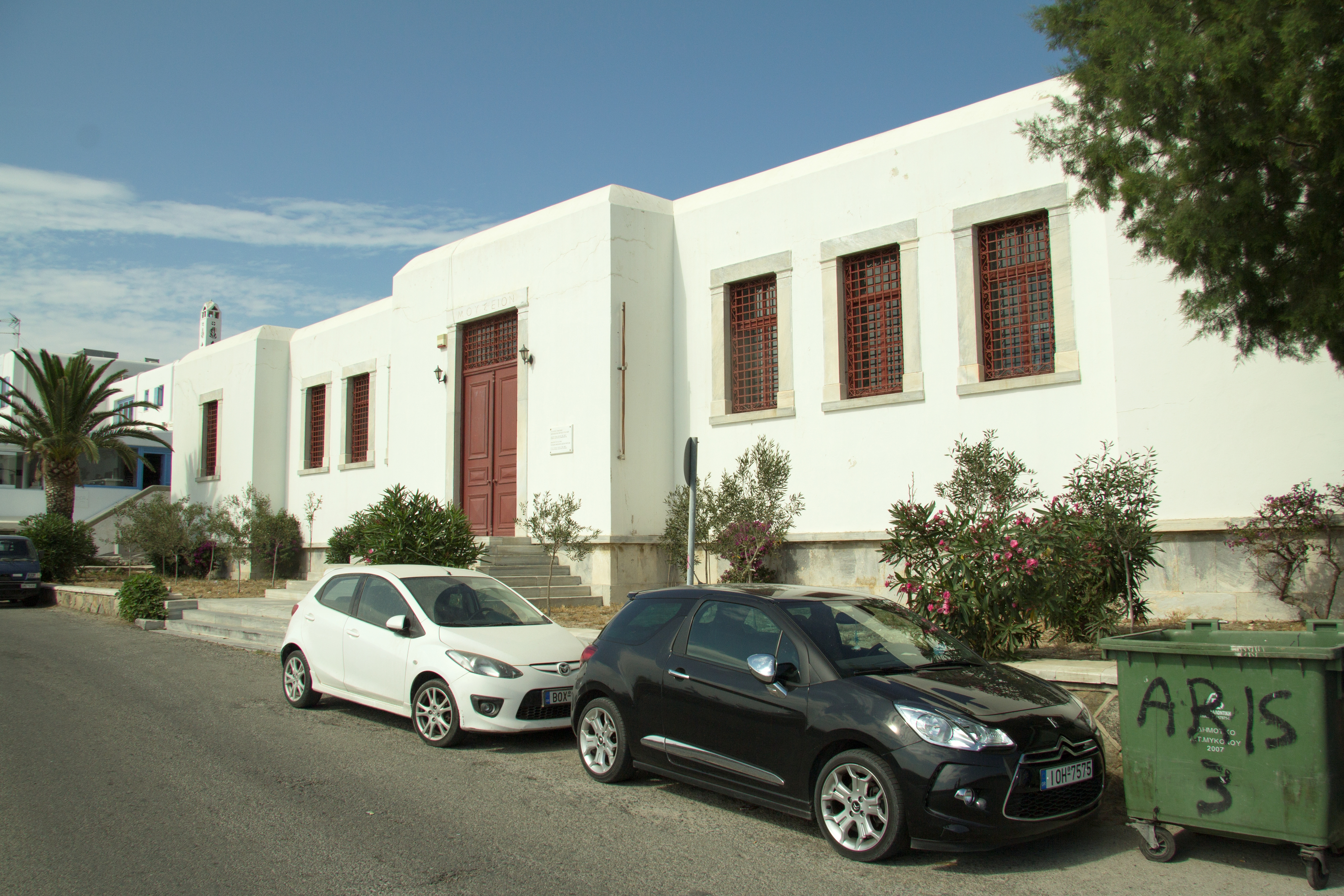
- Museum building

- Location within Greece South Aegean
- Location: Mykonos, Greece
- Type: Archaeological museum

The Archaeological Museum of Mykonos, located near the Old Port of the island of Mykonos, was established in 1902 by the Greek Archaeological Service. It was originally built to house artefacts discovered in a burial site on the nearby islet of Rineia (Rhenia), dating back to 425/426 BC. The museum’s collection includes pottery, funerary urns, and sculptures from the Cycladic, Geometric, and Classical periods, reflecting the island’s archaeological and maritime heritage. The necropolis of Delos was located on Rhenia during Classical and Hellenistic times.

The original neoclassical building of 1905 underwent refurbishments and expansions in the 1930s and 1960s and the large eastern room was added in 1972. The museum contains artefacts from the neighbouring island Rhenia, including 9th- to 8th-century BC ceramic pottery from the Cyclades, and 7th- to 6th-century BC works from other areas in the Aegean. Its most famous item is the large Mykonos vase (Pithos 2240), showing scenes from the fall of Troy.

== Gallery ==
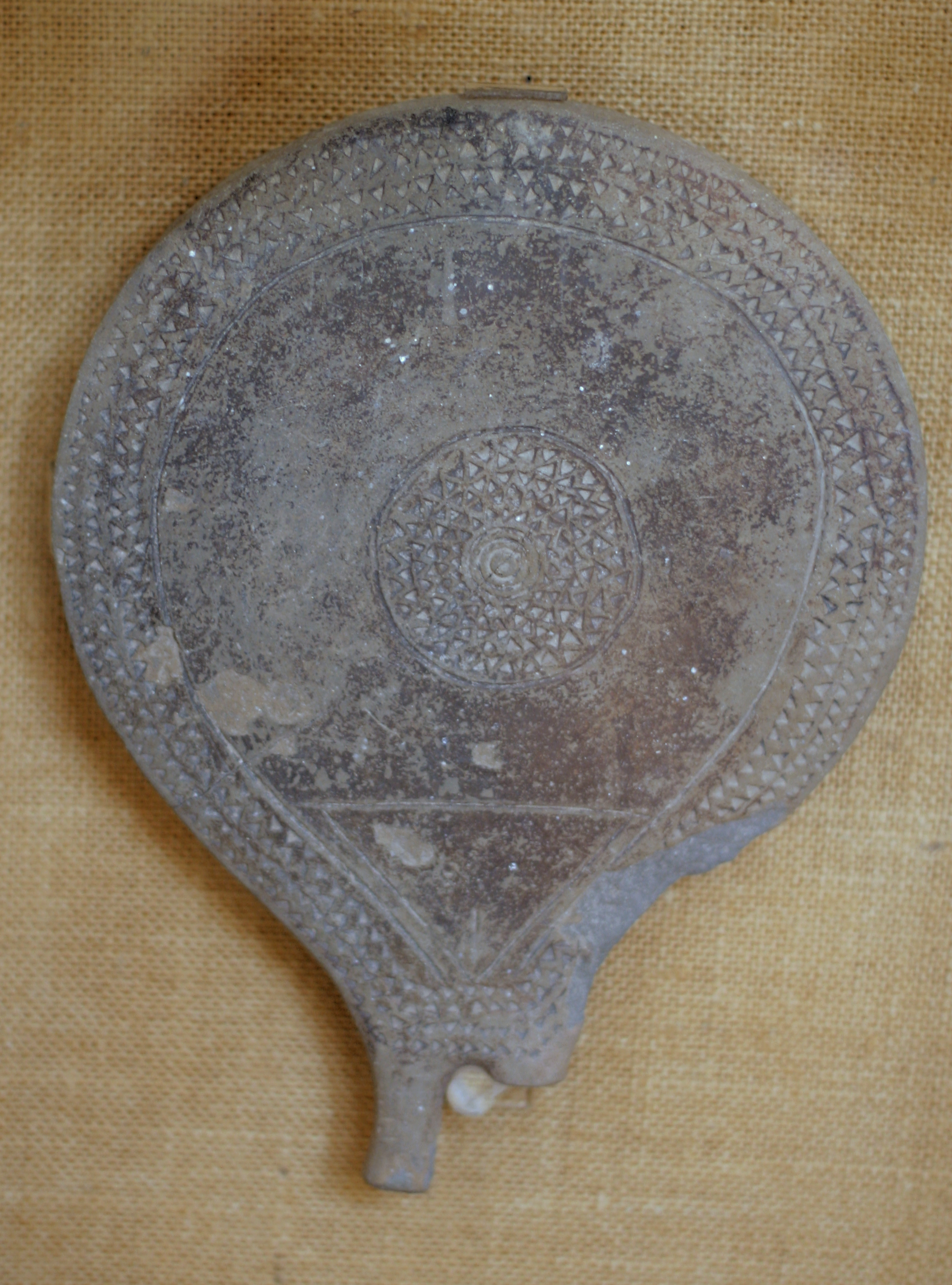
Early Cycladic pottery, 2800-2300 BC

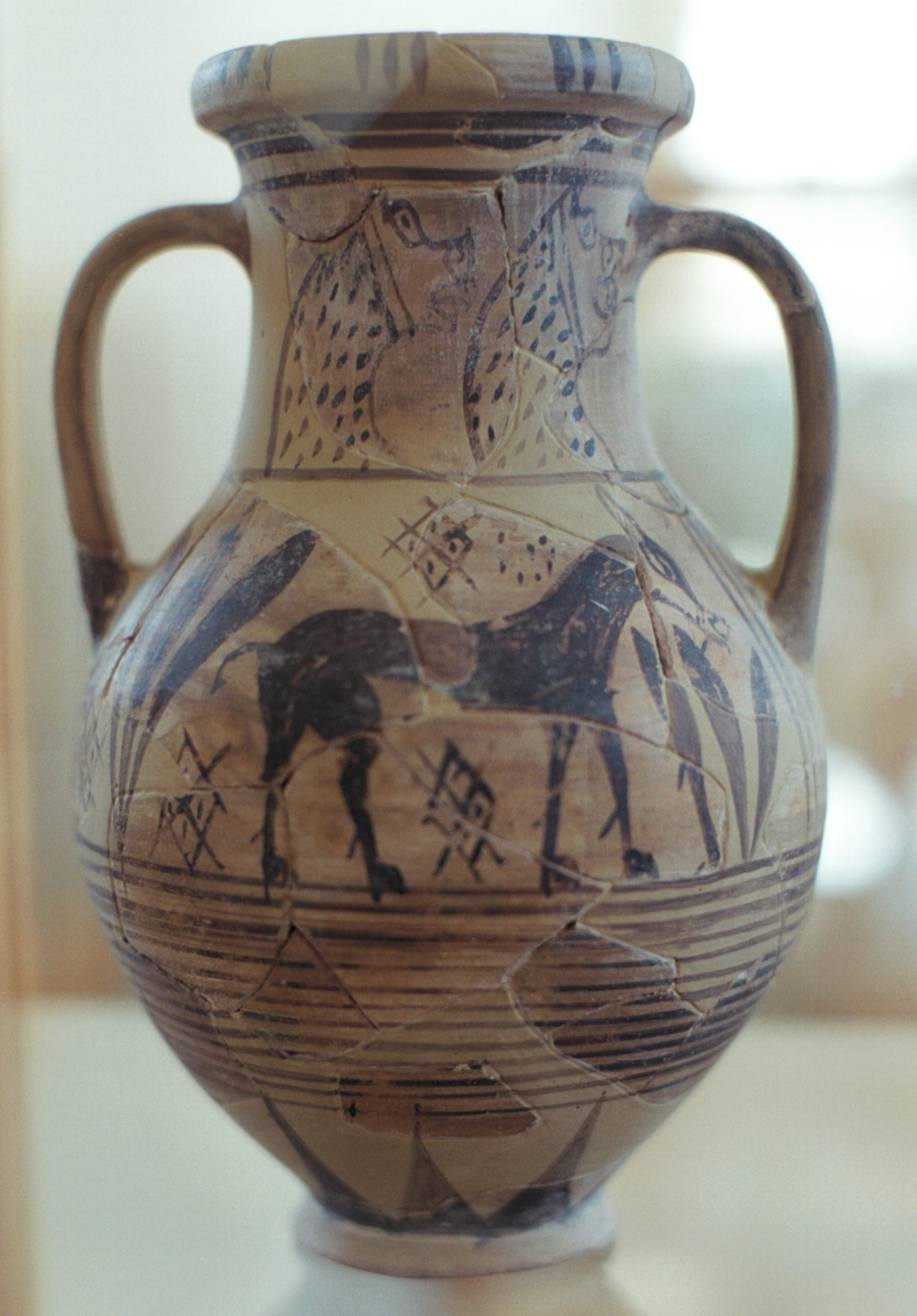
Donkey vase, orientalizing style, probably from Sifnos, 700-650 BC

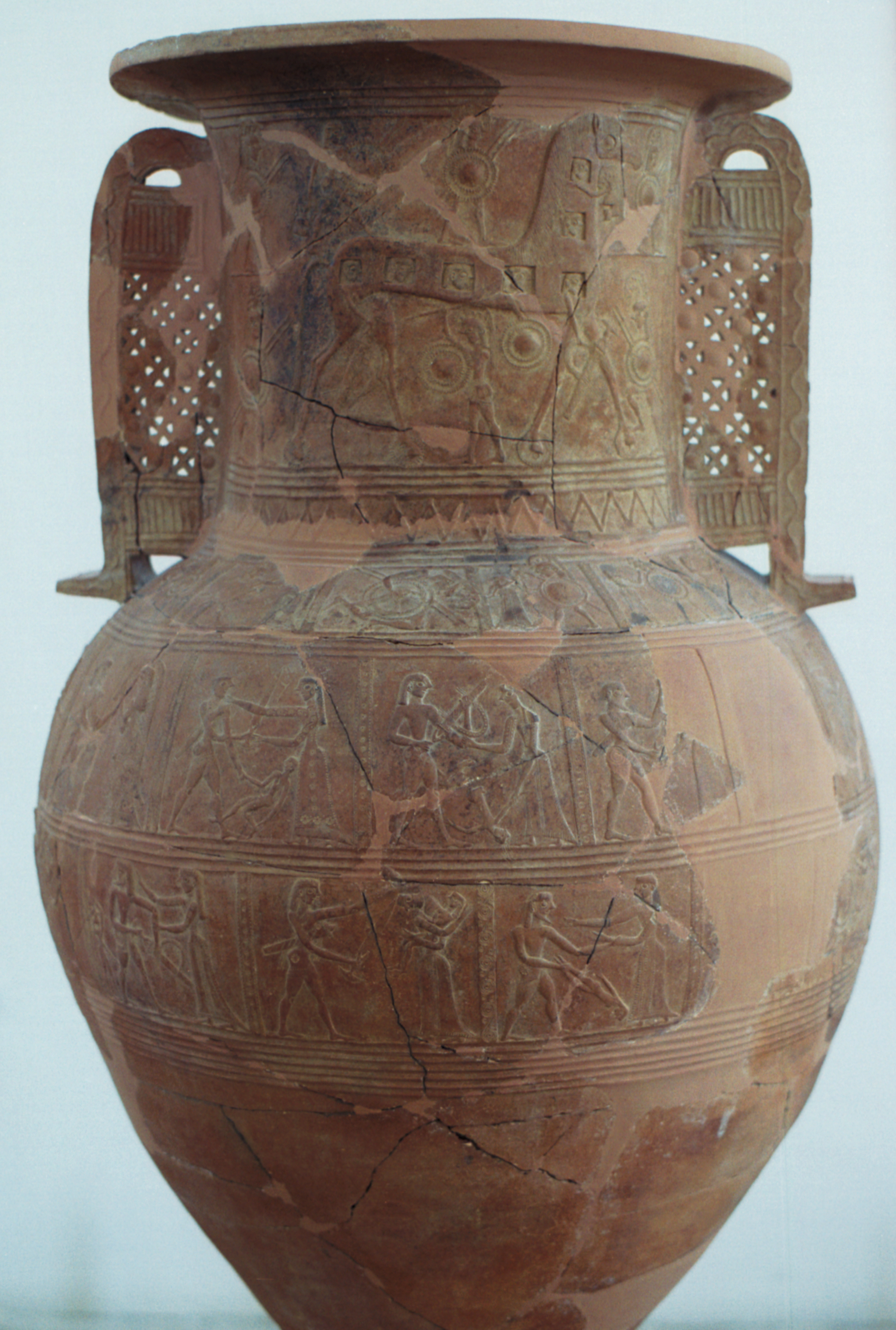
Large relief pithos, capture of Troy, 675-650 BC

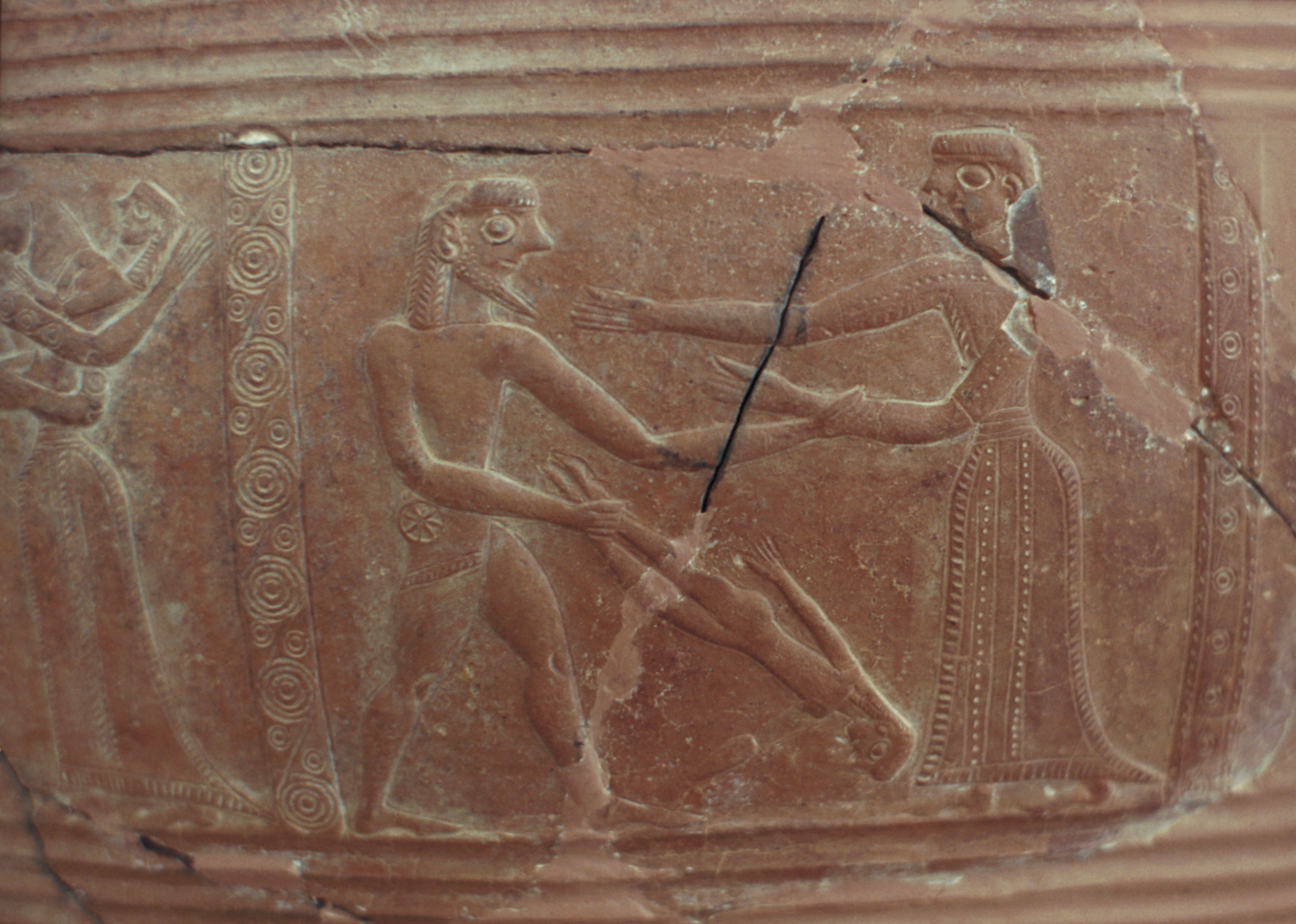
Large relief pithos, capture of Troy, detail, 675-650 BC

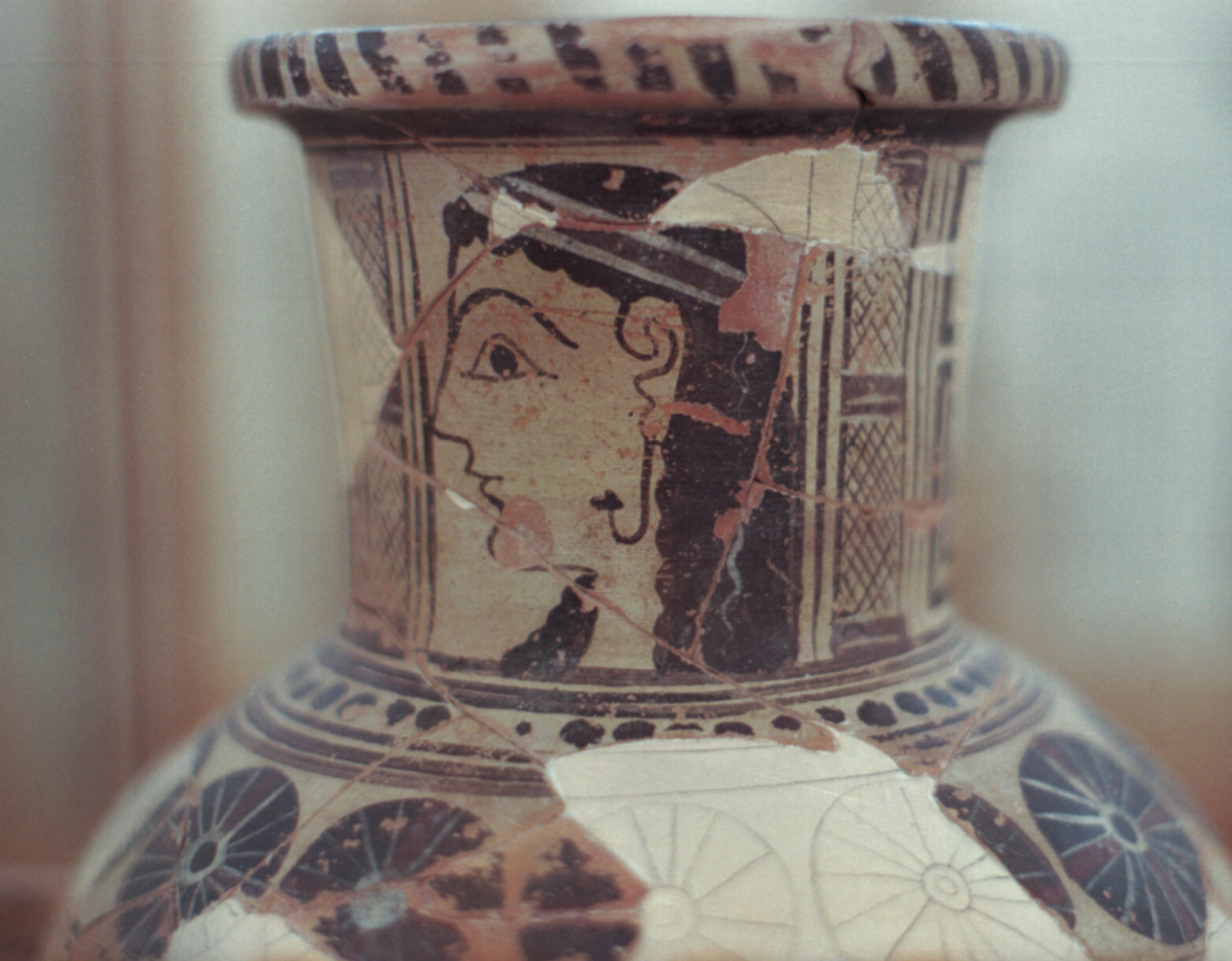
Melian amphora, a girl with earring, 625-600 BC

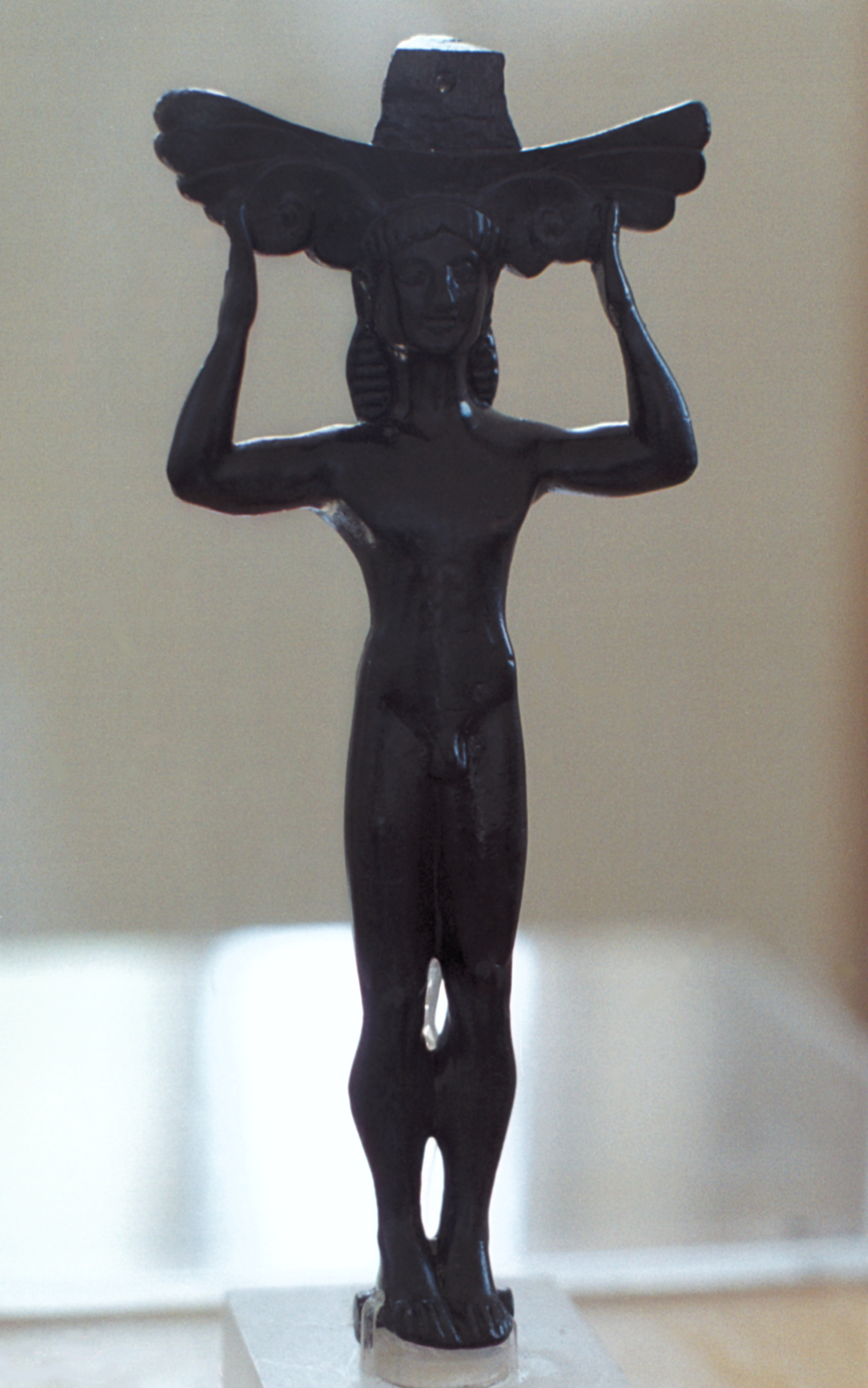
Kouros as a handle, archaic small bronze, 560-540 BC

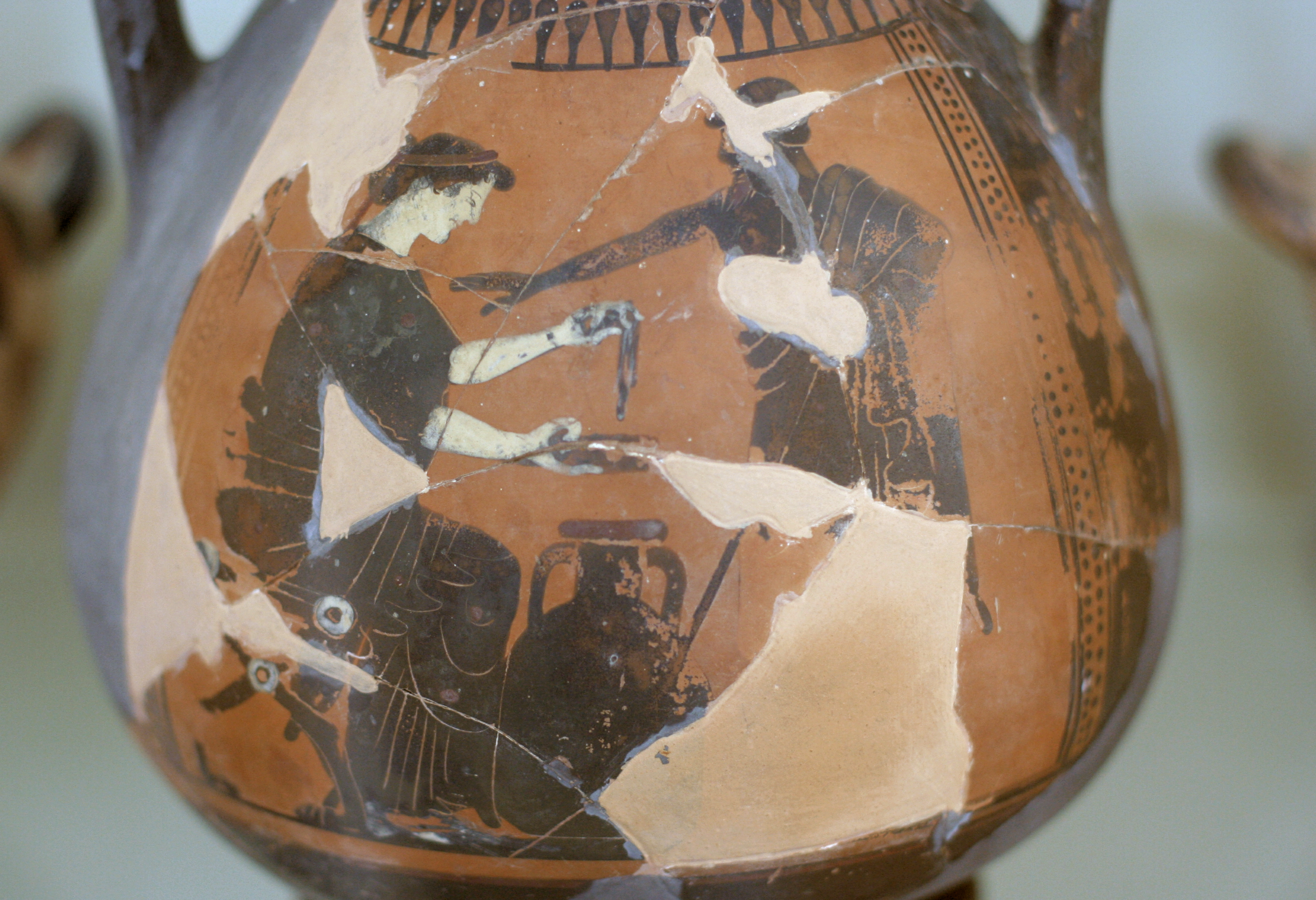
Pelike, sales of oil, Eucharidés painter, 520-500 BC

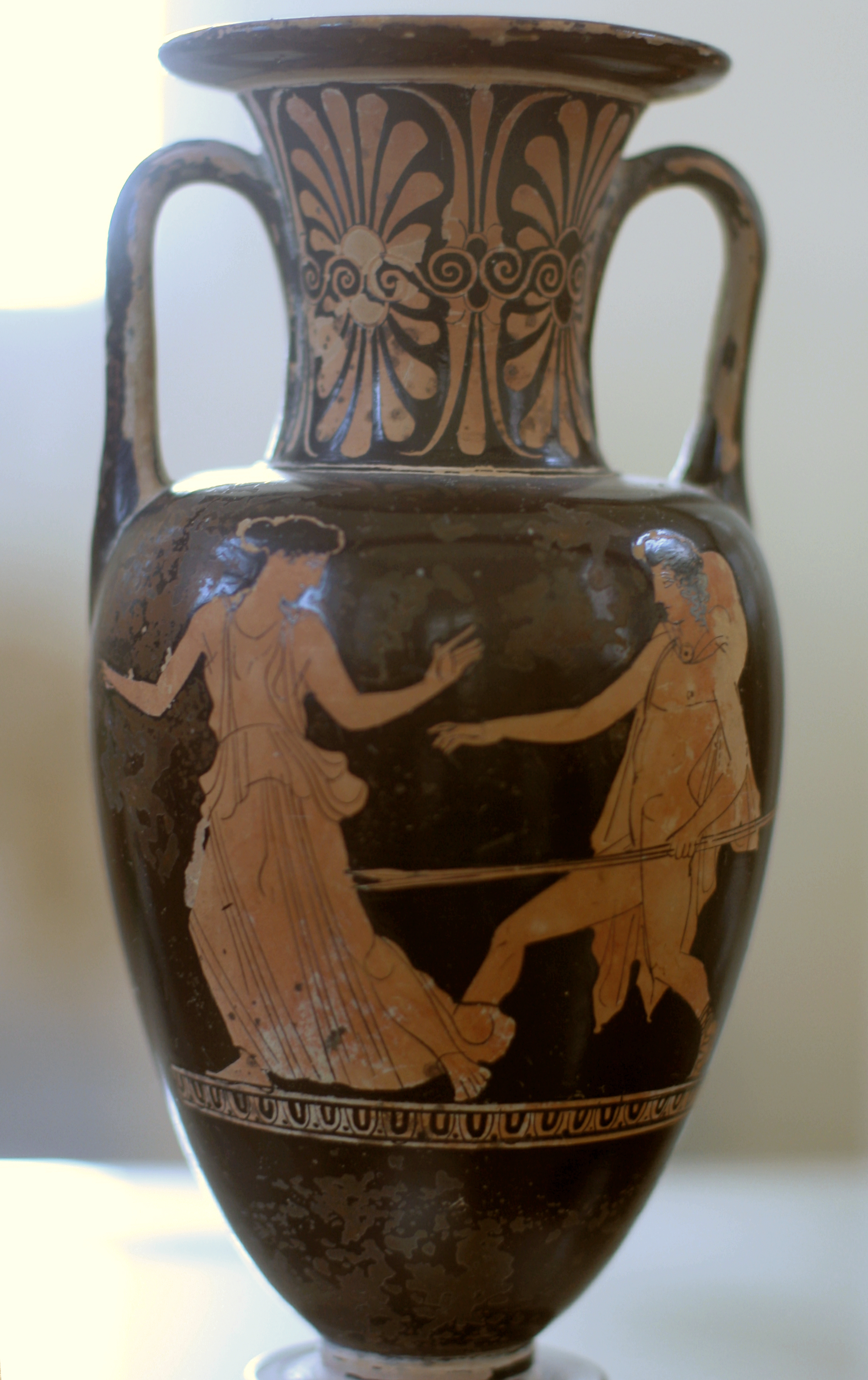
Amphora, Dionysus and menade, Shuvalov Painter, 450-425 BC

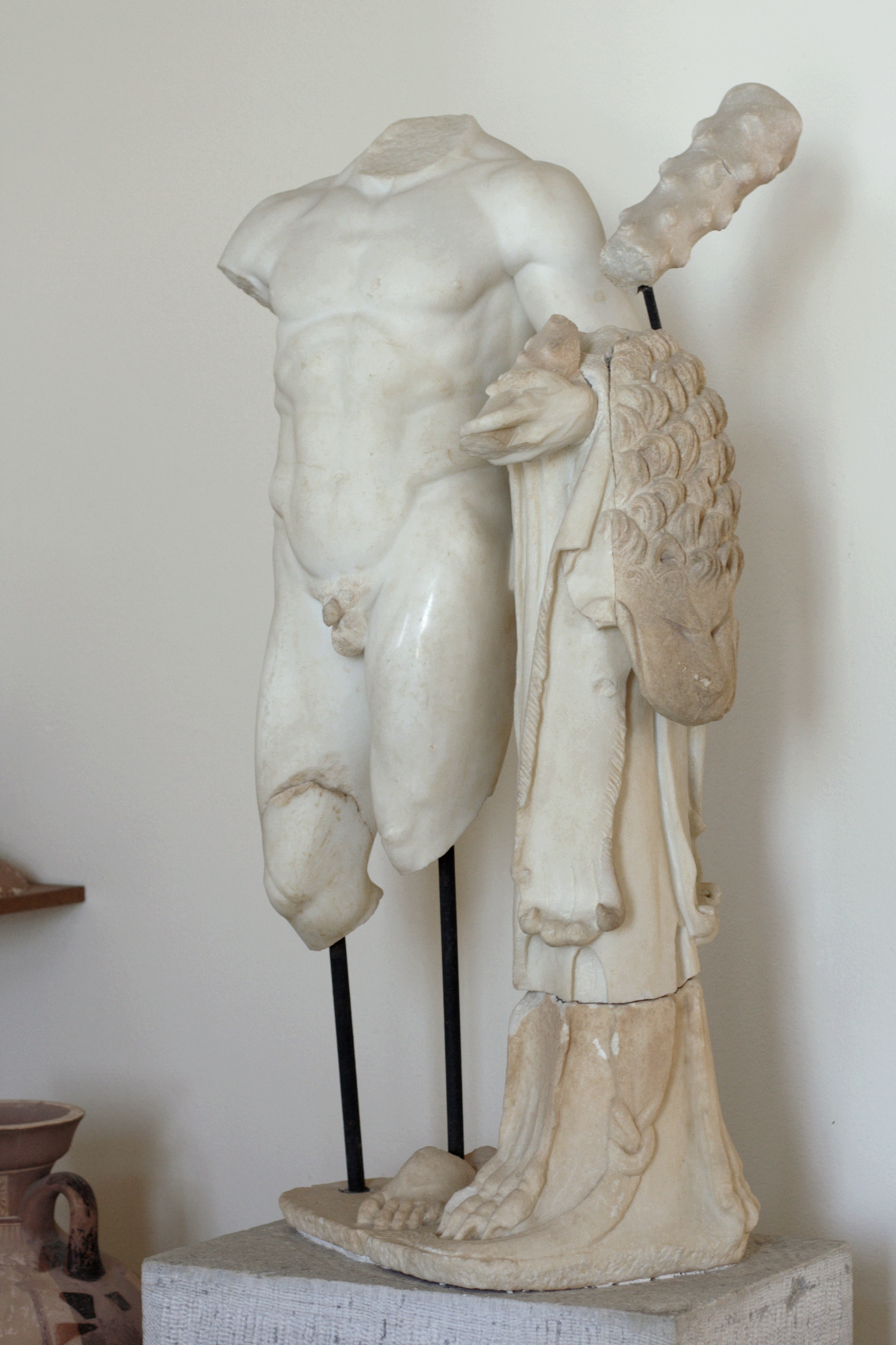
Heracles, Parakastri, Roman copy of a classical Attic work
