= Sinon =

Mythical Greek soldier of the Trojan War

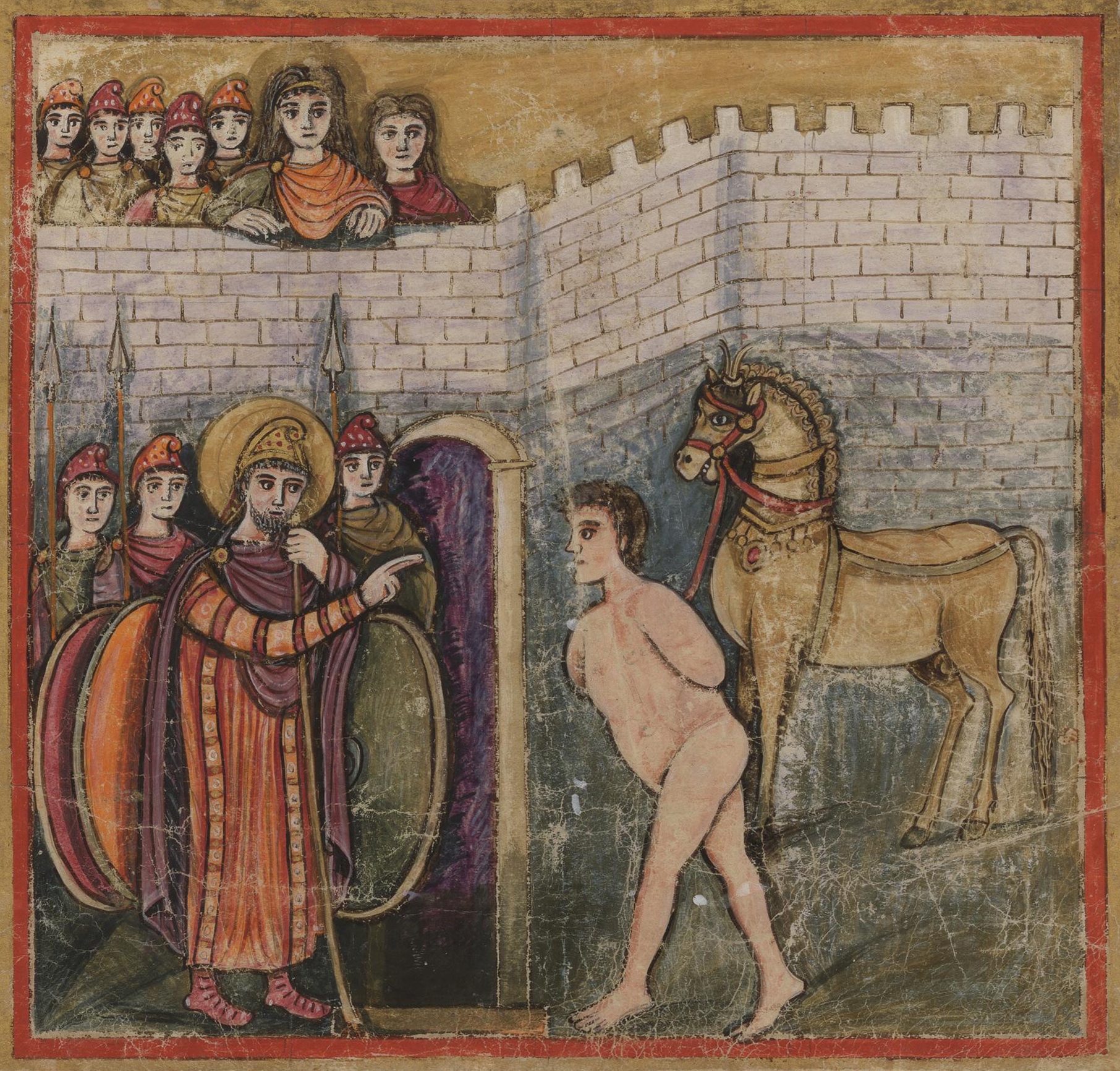
Sinon as a captive in front of the walls of Troy, in the Vergilius Romanus, 5th century AD

In Greek mythology, Sinon (Ancient Greek: Σίνων) or Sinopos was a Greek warrior during the Trojan War.

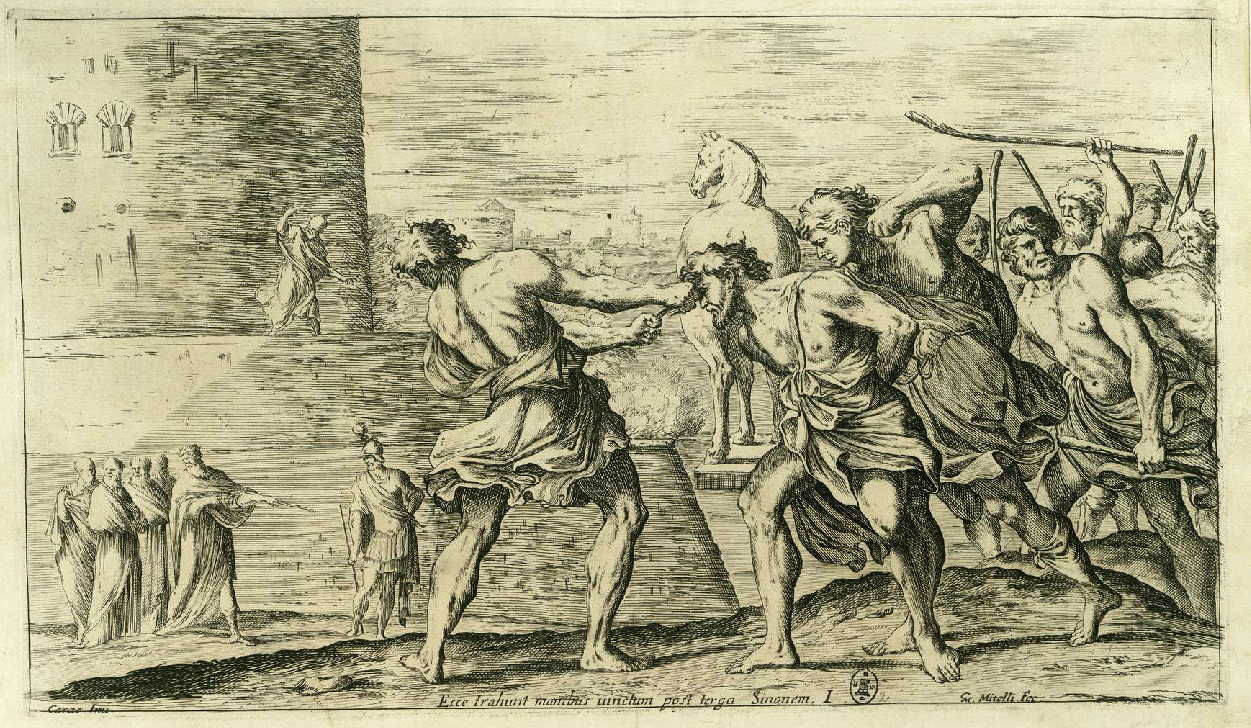
Engraving after frescos by the Carracci, 1663

He is not mentioned by Homer, but his story as given in Virgil's Aeneid and other accounts presents him as a treacherous agent of the Greeks who misleads the Trojans and encourages them to bring the Trojan Horse inside the city. He sometimes appears in art, usually being dragged into Troy as a captive with the horse behind him.

== Family ==
Sinon was the son of Aesimus, son of Autolycus. He was the cousin of Odysseus through his mother Anticlea, daughter of Autolycus.

== Mythology ==
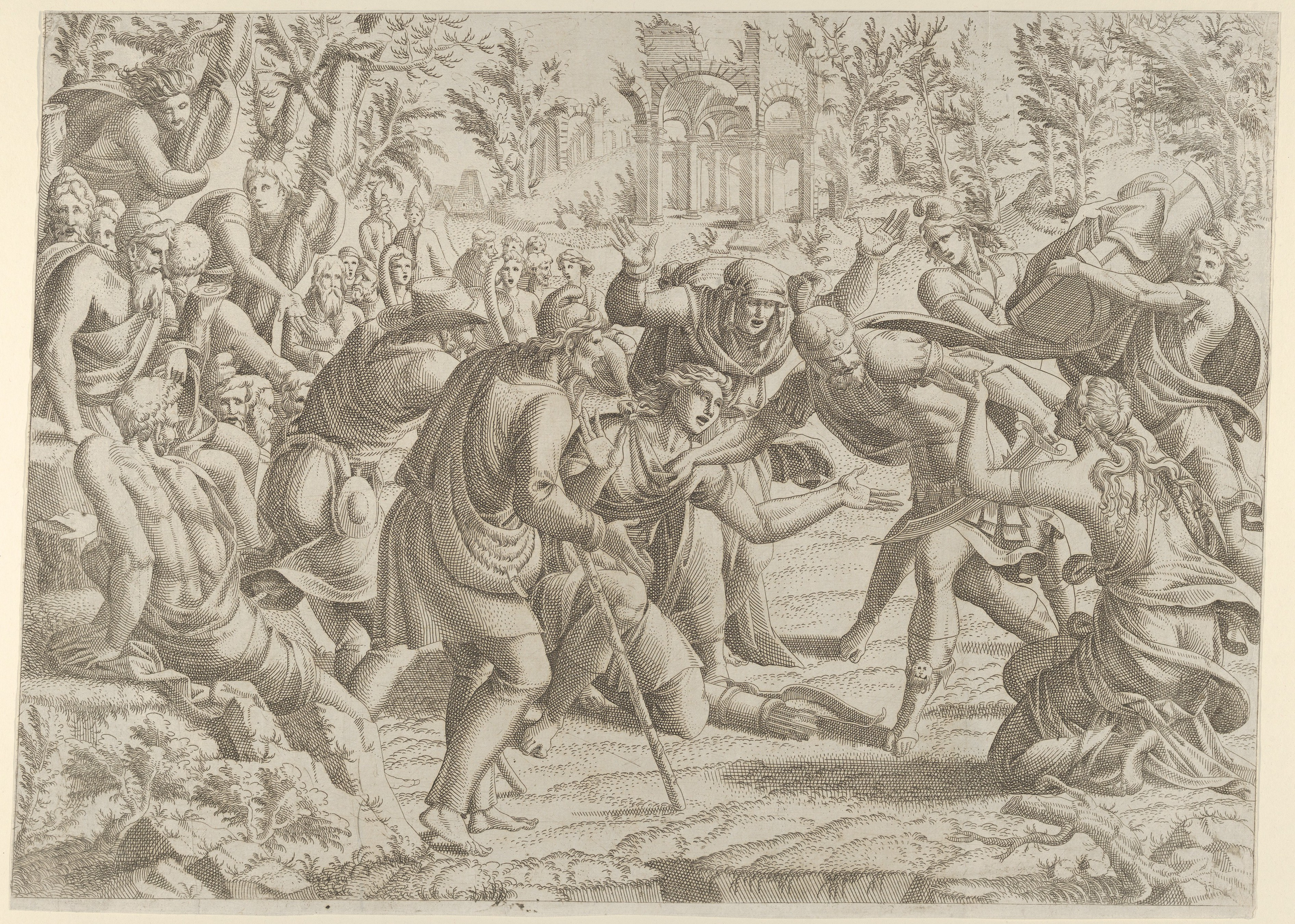
Etching by Jean Mignon, after 1535

=== Iliupersis ===
The Iliupersis ('Sack of Ilium, Sack of Troy'), is a lost epic which recounted the story of Sinon. In one of the work's surviving fragments, Sinon sneaks into the city of Troy by deception and raises a fire-signal to the Achaeans, telling them to sail in from Tenedos.

=== Ilias mikra ===
The Little Iliad is a lost epic which recounted the story of Sinon. In one of its extant fragments, Sinon, at midnight, as the clear moon is rising, secretly shows a signal-light to the Hellenes.

=== Sinon ===
Sophocles wrote a tragedy entitled Sinon, which is currently lost except for four quotations of a word's length or less. It is theorised that Virgil took inspiration from this work, particularly Sinon's speeches to the Trojans.

=== Palaephatus ===
Palaephatus, who sought to rationalize Greek mythology, wrote in Peri Apistōn, translated as On Incredible Things or On Unbelievable Things, that the traditional story claims the Greeks captured Troy by hiding inside the hollow wooden horse, but he rejects this account as too mythical. Instead, he says the Greeks built a wooden horse too large to be brought inside the city gates. The Greek captains, which Palaephatus says was called the "Argive Company" (Ἀργείων λόχος) until his own day, waited near the city. Sinon presented himself to the Trojans as a deserter from the Greek army and told them that a prophecy said the Greeks would return if the Trojans did not bring the horse inside the city, but would never return if they did so. The Trojans tore down part of their city walls to bring the horse inside. While they were feasting, the Greeks attacked through the breach in the wall and captured the city.

=== Aeneid ===
In the Aeneid (Book II, ln. 57 ff.), Aeneas recounts how Sinon was found outside Troy after the rest of the Greek army had sailed away and was brought to Priam by shepherds who discovered him. Pretending to have deserted the Greeks, he told the Trojans that the giant wooden horse the Greeks had left behind was intended as a gift to the gods to ensure their safe voyage home. He told the Trojans that the horse was made too large to be moved into the city, because doing so would make them be invincible to later Achaean invasion. His story convinced the Trojans because it included those details along with his claim that Odysseus had left him behind to die because they had long been enemies.

The Trojans brought the Trojan Horse into their city against the advice of Cassandra, who had received the gift of prophecy from Apollo, but who for not returning his love was then condemned to never have her prophecies believed. They were also persuaded by the fate of Laocoön, who had attacked the wooden horse with a spear and then died with his two sons by two serpents who attacked them from the sea. Inside the wooden horse hid Greek soldiers, who emerged as night fell and opened the city gates to the Greek army, ensuring their destruction of Troy. Sinon also informed the Greeks when the soldiers in the horse had begun their fight.

This scene is in neither the Iliad nor the Odyssey, but is in the Aeneid; it is central to the perspective Virgil builds in support of Roman sentiment in his day which viewed the Greeks as cunning, deceitful, and treacherous.

=== Apollodorus ===
Apollodorus writes in the Bibliotheca that after the Greeks placed the bravest warriors inside the Trojan Horse, they burned their tents and sailed away by night to lie off Tenedos. Before departing, they left Sinon behind, whose task was to light a beacon as a signal to the fleet.

Later, when night had fallen and the Trojans were asleep, Sinon kindled the beacon on the grave of Achilles to guide the Greek fleet back from Tenedos. As the Greeks approached the city by sea, the warriors inside the Horse waited until they believed their enemies were asleep, then opened the Horse, emerged with their weapons, and admitted their returning comrades into Troy through the opened gates.

=== Dictys Cretensis ===
Dictys Cretensis writes that after the Greeks had left and later, during the night, returned to Troy, they sailed through the silence of the night, following the beacon that Sinon raised from his hidden position. The beacon guided the Greeks back to the city so that they could enter the walls and begin their attack.

=== Fabulae ===
In Fabulae, Hyginus writes that at night, when the Trojans were asleep, the Greeks came out of the Trojan Horse after it had been opened by Sinon. The Achaeans then killed the guards at the gates and, at a given signal, admitted their companions into the city, after which they gained possession of Troy.

=== Alosis Iliou ===
In Tryphiodorus' Alosis Iliou, translated as The Taking of Ilion, The Taking of Ilios, The Sack of Troy or The Taking of Troy, Sinon was left behind at Troy after the Greek army pretended to sail away. He had been deliberately wounded and marked with signs of suffering so that he would appear as a victim of Greek cruelty. When the Trojans discovered him beside the Wooden Horse, he approached King Priam as a suppliant and told his story. He claimed that the Greeks had mistreated him because he opposed their departure and that they had abandoned him on the shore. To support his account, he recalled the suffering of other Greeks at the hands of their own people, including Achilles, Philoctetes, and Palamedes.

Sinon begged Priam for mercy and promised that he could help the Trojans. When Priam accepted him and asked about the Wooden Horse, Sinon explained that it had been built by Epeius. He claimed that the Horse was a sacred offering to Athena and that Troy would be saved if the Trojans brought it inside the city, but that the city would fall if they rejected it. Priam trusted Sinon and allowed the Trojans to drag the Wooden Horse into Troy.

After the Trojans celebrated and fell asleep, Sinon gave the signal for the Greek forces to return by raising a torch beside the tomb of Achilles. At the same time, Helen also signaled the Greeks by displaying a golden torch from her chamber within the city.

=== Posthomerica ===
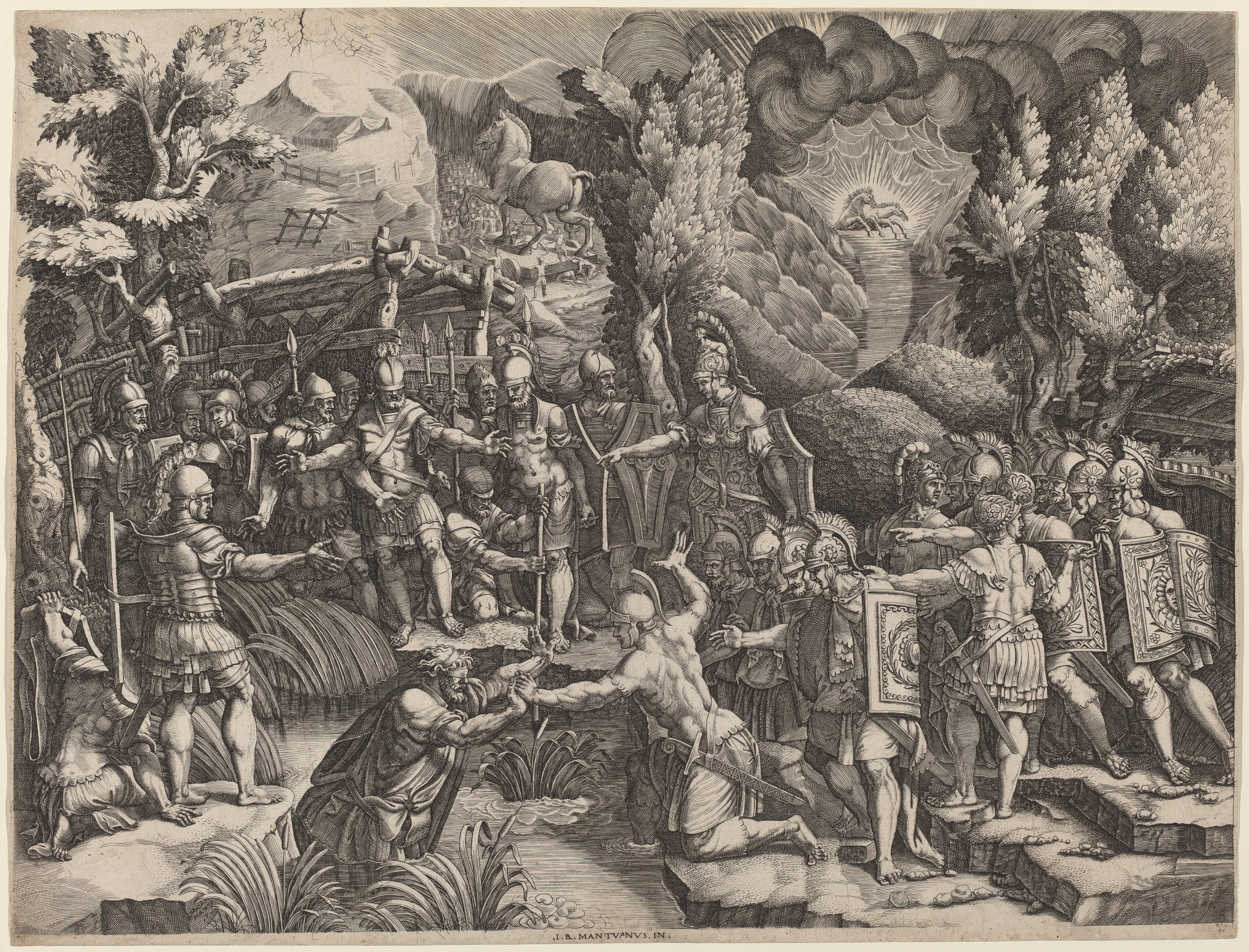
Engraving, Giorgio Ghisi after Giovanni Battista Scultori, Sinon Deceiving the Trojans, c. 1545

In Quintus Smyrnaeus's Posthomerica, written in around the third century AD as an immediate continuation of Homer's Iliad, the Trojans, ready to attack the Greek camp, see smoke coming from the Greek camp and cautiously approach. When they arrive at the camp they find only Sinon alongside the Trojan Horse. The reader later finds out that it was Sinon who started the fire signal that drew the Trojans to the Greek camp. The rest of the camp is deserted. The Trojans circle him and gently ask him questions but when he does not answer they grow angry and begin to threaten to stab him. When he still does not answer, the Trojans cut off his ears and nose. Finally he tells them that the Greeks have fled and they built the Trojan Horse to honor Athena. Sinon claims that Odysseus wanted to sacrifice him but he managed to escape and hide in a marsh. When they gave up looking for him and left he returned to the Trojan Horse. Sinon claims that the Greeks stopped looking for him out of respect for Zeus. All the Trojans believe this story, except Laocoön who, along with his two sons, is promptly attacked by a giant sea serpent. Following this, believing that Laocoön was attacked because he offended the gods, the rest of the Trojans begin to believe Sinon's story. Feeling bad for Sinon, and fearing wrath from the gods, the Trojans bring Sinon and the Trojan Horse into Troy.

== Polygnotus' painting ==
Pausanias in his Description of Greece tells of a painting done by the Athenian artist Polygnotus (5th century BC) of the Sack of Troy, which was displayed in the Lesche of the Knidians at Delphi, wherein the body of Laomedon is being carried away by Sinon, who is described as a companion of Odysseus, together with Anchialus. Another corpse, that of Eresus, is also depicted in the painting. Pausanias remarks that, as far as he knows, no poet had told the story of either Eresus or Laomedon.

== In other literature ==
In Dante Alighieri's poem Inferno (Canto 30), Sinon is seen in the Tenth Bolgia of Hell's Circle of Fraud where, along with other falsifiers of words, he is condemned to suffer a burning fever for all eternity. Sinon is here rather than in the Evil Counselors Bolgia because his advice was false as well as evil.

The word "Sinonical" was coined by Lewes Lewknor in his 1595 work The Estate of English Fugitives.

William Shakespeare referred to Sinon on several occasions in his plays, using him as a symbol of treachery. For instance, in Cymbeline Imogen says to Pisanio, "True honest men being heard, like false Aeneas, / Were in his time thought false, and Sinon's weeping / Did scandal many a holy tear" (Act 3, Scene 4). In Henry VI Part III, the Duke of Gloucester says, "I'll play the orator as well as Nestor, / Deceive more slily than Ulysses could, / And, like a Sinon, take another Troy" (Act 3, Scene 2).

In Chapter 4 of George Eliot's historical novel Romola, the main character Tito Melema, during his first full day in Renaissance Florence, is asked by a painter if he would model as Sinon for a canvas depicting Sinon deceiving Priam, shocking Tito at the implication and foreshadowing his treachery later in the novel.

== In popular culture ==
In The Odyssey (2026), directed by Christopher Nolan, Sinon is portrayed by Elliot Page. In the film, Sinon is an Ithacan under Odysseus who was abandoned at Troy, killed by the Trojans, and kept unaware of the horse's nature; he is later seen in Hades angry at being deceived into violating xenia.
