= Epeius of Phocis =

Mythological Greek soldier

Epeius
- Architect of the Trojan Horse
- Abode: Cyclades
- Parents: Panopeus

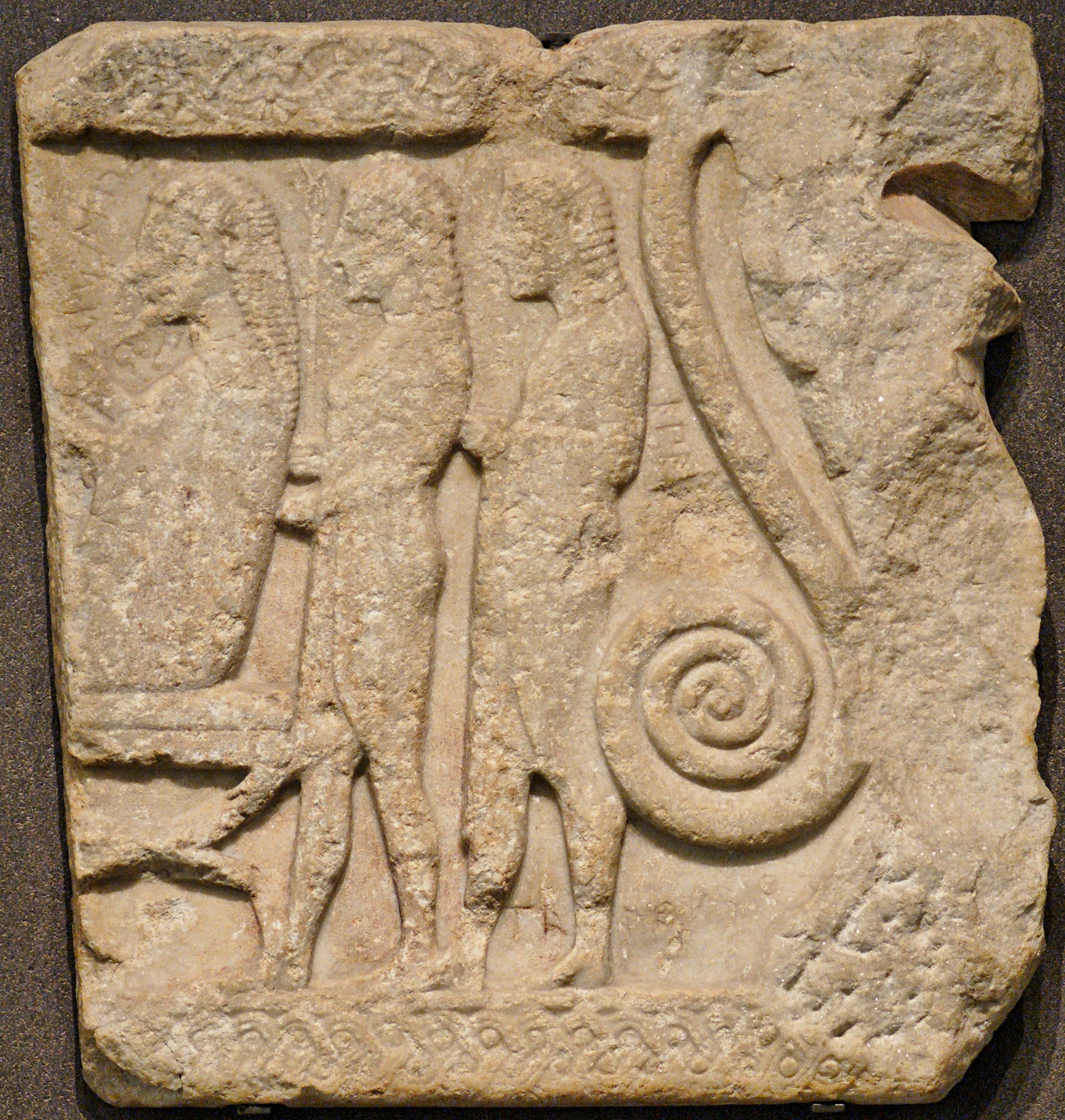
Agamemnon, Talthybius and Epeius, relief from Samothrace, ca. 560 BC, Louvre

Epeius (/ɪˈpaɪ.əs/; Ancient Greek: Ἐπειός Epeiós) or Epeus was a mythological Greek soldier during the Trojan War or, in some accounts, one of the Achaean Leaders, at the head of a contingent of 30 ships from the islands of the Cyclades. He was also the architect of the Wooden Horse, by means of which the Achaeans took Troy; he was himself among those warriors who hid inside it.

== Family ==
Epeius was the son of Panopeus, son of Phocus and Asterodia.

== Mythology ==
Epeius had the reputation for being a giant, with enormous strength. In the Iliad he was victorious after participating in the boxing match against Euryalus at the funeral games in honour of Patroclus. Later during the funeral games for Achilles he fought Acamas, the son of Theseus, to a stalemate. He built the Trojan Horse, commissioned by Odysseus because Athena had told him in a dream she would be with him to help build it. The horse was hollow and was large enough to hold 30 Greek soldiers equipped with all their armor but Epeius made the Trojan horse so tall that it could not fit through any of the gates of Troy. The trap door of the horse was fastened with a special catch that only Epeius could undo. After constructing the massive horse, he chose the other 29 soldiers that would accompany him inside the horse. He also founded Pisa and Metapontum.

Apollodorus writes in the Bibliotheca that Odysseus came up with the plan for the Wooden Horse and assigned its construction to Epeius, who was an architect. Epeius cut down timber on Mount Ida and built the horse with a hollow interior and openings in its sides, allowing Greek warriors to hide inside.

Ancient authors write that after the Trojan War, Epeius settled in Italy and dedicated the tools with which he had constructed the Trojan Horse to Athena. The Aristotelian Corpus records that these tools were preserved as sacred offerings in Hellenian Athena's sanctuary near Metapontum.
