= Trojan Horse =

Wooden horse in Greek mythology

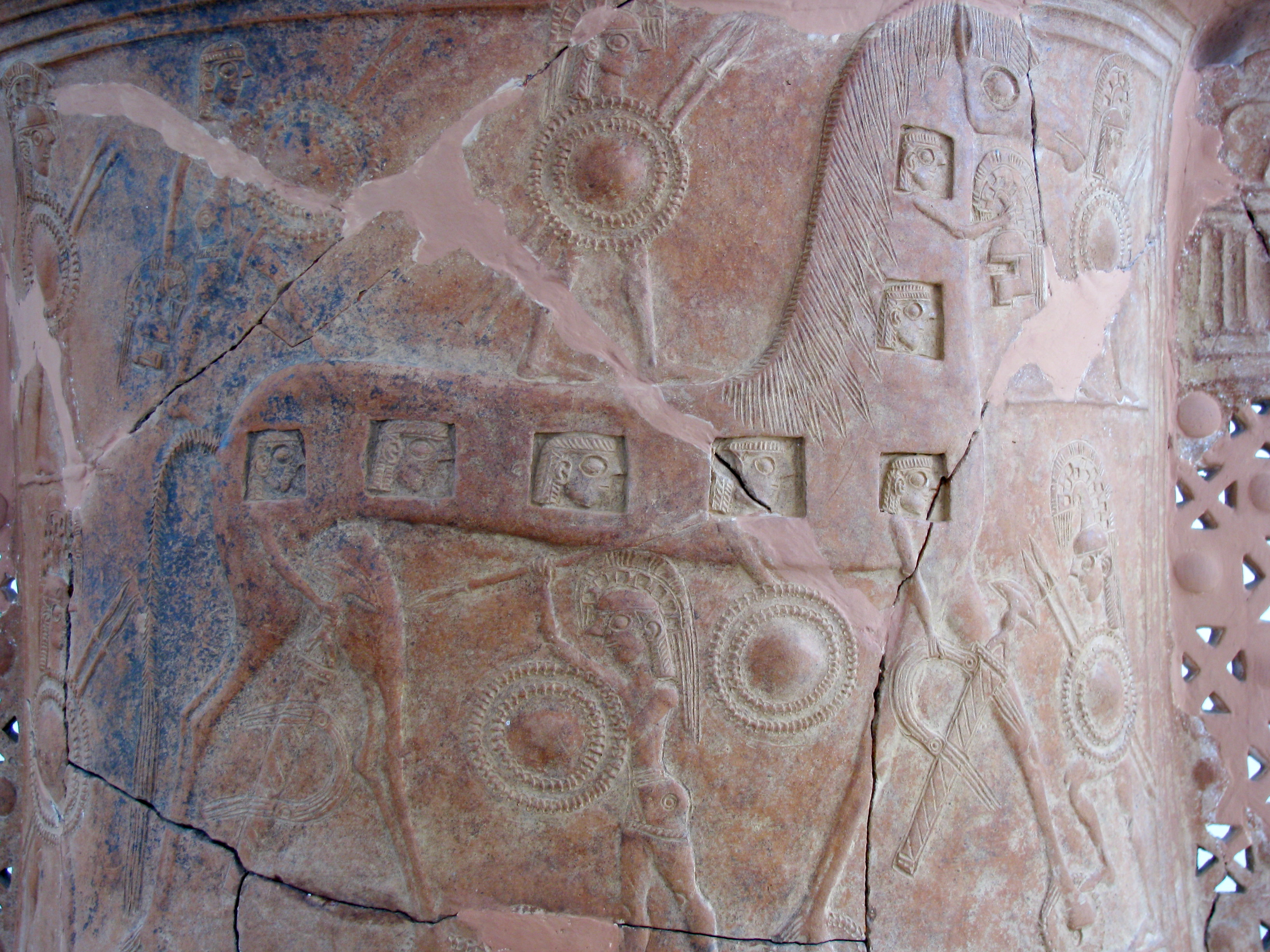
The Mykonos vase (750 to 650 BC), with one of the earliest known renditions of the Trojan Horse (note the depiction of the faces of hidden warriors shown on the horse's side)

In Greek mythology, the Trojan Horse (Greek: δούρειος ἵππος, romanized: doureios hippos, lit. 'wooden horse') was a wooden horse said to have been used by the Greeks during the Trojan War to sneak into the city of Troy and win the war. The Trojan Horse is not mentioned in Homer's Iliad, with the poem ending before the war is concluded, and it is only briefly mentioned in the Odyssey. It is described at length in the Aeneid, in which Virgil recounts how, after a fruitless ten-year siege, the Greeks constructed a huge wooden horse at the behest of Odysseus, and hid a select force of men inside, including Odysseus himself.

The Greeks pretended to sail away, and the Trojans pulled the horse into their city as a victory trophy. That night, the Greek force crept out of the horse and opened the gates for the rest of the Greek army, which had sailed back under the cover of darkness. The Greeks entered and destroyed the city, ending the war. Metaphorically, a "Trojan horse" has come to mean any trick or stratagem that causes a target to invite a foe into a securely protected bastion or place. A malicious computer program that tricks users into willingly running it is also called a "Trojan horse" or simply a "Trojan".

The main ancient source for the story still extant is the Aeneid of Virgil, a Latin epic poem from the time of Augustus. The story featured heavily in the Little Iliad and the Sack of Troy, both part of the Epic Cycle, but these have only survived in fragments and epitomes. As Odysseus was the chief architect of the Trojan Horse, it is also referred to in Homer's Odyssey. In the Greek tradition, the horse is called the "wooden horse" (δουράτεος ἵππος douráteos híppos in Homeric/Ionic Greek (Odyssey 8.512); δούρειος ἵππος, doúreios híppos in Attic Greek). In Dictys Cretensis' account, the idea of the Trojan Horse's construction comes from Helenus, who prophesies that the Greeks must dedicate a wooden horse to Athena.

== Warriors in the horse ==
Thirty of the Achaeans' best warriors hid in the Trojan horse's womb and two spies in its mouth. Other sources give different numbers: The Bibliotheca 50; Tzetzes 23; and Quintus Smyrnaeus gives the names of 30, but says there were more. In late tradition, the number was standardized at 40. Their names follow:

List of Achaeans in the Trojan Horse
Names	Sources			
Names	Quintus	Hyginus	Tryphiodorus	Tzetzes
Odysseus (leader)	✓	✓	✓	✓
Acamas	✓	✓	✓	✓
Agapenor	✓			
Ajax the Lesser	✓		✓	✓
Amphidamas			✓	✓
Amphimachus	✓			
Anticlus	✓		✓	✓
Antimachus	✓			
Antiphates			✓	✓
Calchas			✓	✓
Cyanippus			✓	✓
Demophon	✓		✓	✓
Diomedes	✓	✓	✓	✓
Echion				
Epeius	✓		✓	✓
Eumelus	✓		✓	✓
Euryalus	✓			
Eurydamas			✓	✓
Eurymachus	✓			
Eurypylus	✓		✓	✓
Ialmenus	✓			
Idomeneus	✓		✓	✓
Iphidamas			✓	✓
Leonteus	✓		✓	✓
Machaon		✓		
Meges	✓		✓	✓
Menelaus	✓	✓	✓	✓
Menestheus	✓			
Meriones	✓			
Neoptolemus	✓	✓	✓	✓
Peneleos			✓	✓
Philoctetes	✓			
Podalirius	✓			
Polypoetes	✓			
Sthenelus	✓	✓		
Teucer	✓		✓	✓
Thalpius	✓			
Thersander		✓		
Thoas	✓	✓		
Thrasymedes	✓		✓	✓
Number	30	9	23	23

== Literary accounts ==
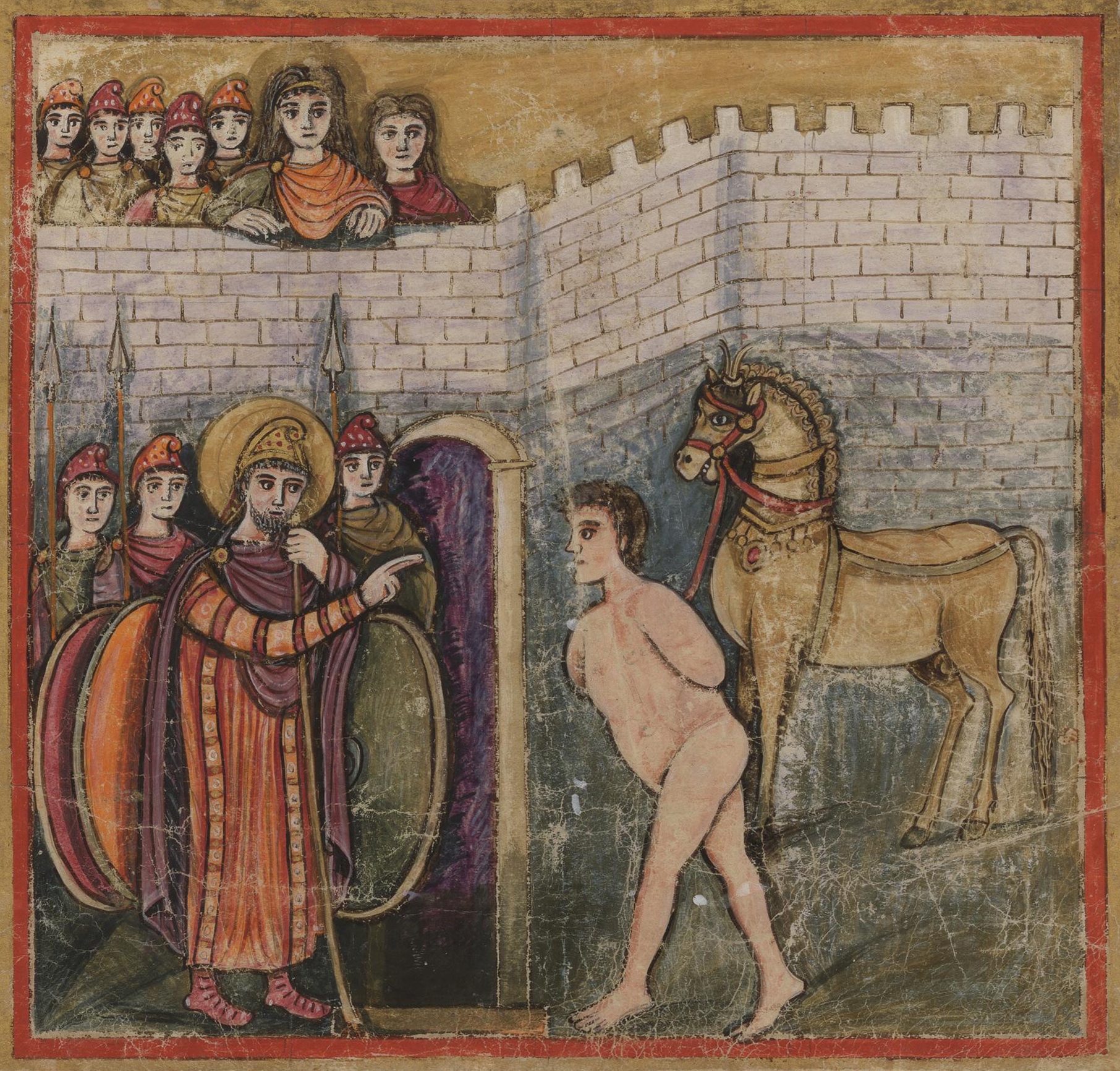
Sinon is brought to Priam, from folio 101r of the Roman Vergil.

The incident of the wooden horse is not mentioned in Homer's Iliad (which ends before the close of the war), but is mentioned in passing in the Odyssey (c. 8th century BC):

What a thing was this, too, which that mighty man wrought and endured in the carven horse, wherein all we chiefs of the Argives were sitting, bearing to the Trojans death and fate!

But come now, change thy theme, and sing of the building of the horse of wood, which Epeius made with Athena's help, the horse which once Odysseus led up into the citadel as a thing of guile, when he had filled it with the men who sacked Ilios.

Homer adds that Helen guessed the plot and tried to trick and uncover the Greek soldiers inside the horse by imitating the voices of their wives, and Anticlus attempted to answer, but Odysseus shut his mouth with his hand. The story is also alluded to in Greek classical literature. In Euripides' play Trojan Women (415 BC), the god Poseidon proclaims: "For, from his home beneath Parnassus, Phocian Epeus, aided by the craft of Pallas, framed a horse to bear within its womb an armed host, and sent it within the battlements, fraught with death; whence in days to come men shall tell of 'the wooden horse,' with its hidden load of warriors."

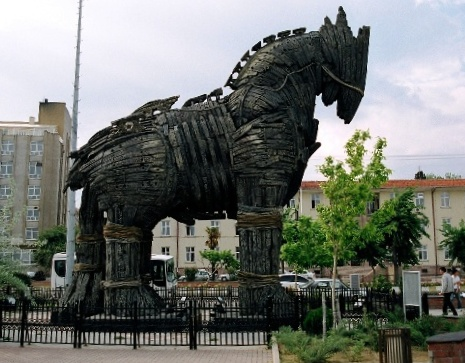
A replica of the Trojan Horse, used in the 2004 film Troy, stands today in Çanakkale, Turkey, the modern-day location of the city of Troy.

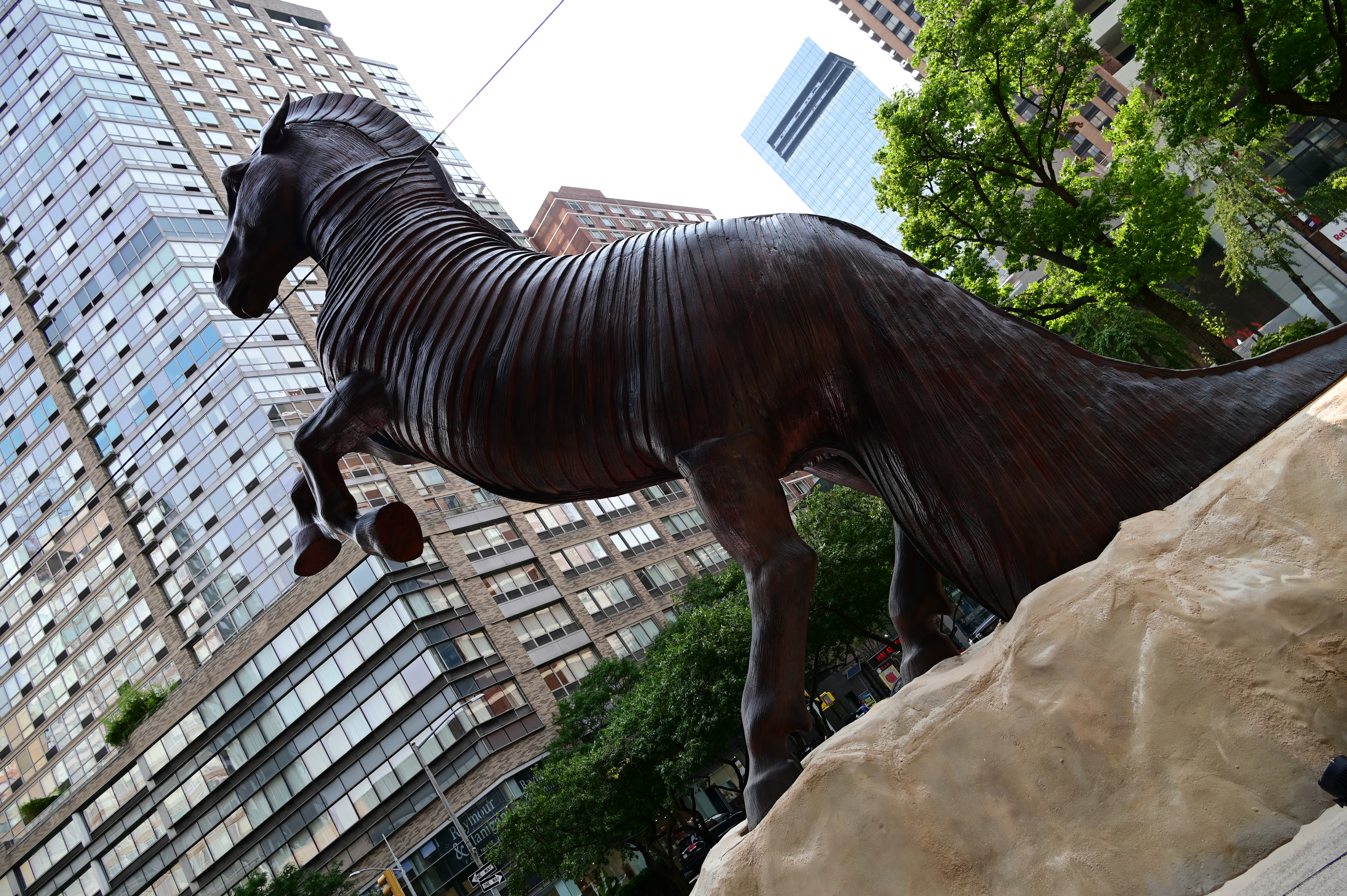
A replica of the Trojan Horse, used in the 2026 film The Odyssey during the film's premiere in New York City

The most detailed and most familiar version, however, comes from Roman poet Virgil's Aeneid (19 BC), Book II:

After many years have slipped by, the leaders of the Greeks,
opposed by the Fates, and damaged by the war,
build a horse of mountainous size, through Pallas's divine art,
and weave planks of fir over its ribs
they pretend it's a votive offering: this rumour spreads.
They secretly hide a picked body of men, chosen by lot,
there, in the dark body, filling the belly and the huge
cavernous insides with armed warriors.
[...]
Then Laocoön rushes down eagerly from the heights
of the citadel, to confront them all, a large crowd with him,
and shouts from far off: "O unhappy citizens, what madness?
Do you think the enemy's sailed away? Or do you think
any Greek gift's free of treachery? Is that Ulysses's reputation?
Either there are Greeks in hiding, concealed by the wood,
or it's been built as a machine to use against our walls,
or spy on our homes, or fall on the city from above,
or it hides some other trick: Trojans, don't trust this horse.
Whatever it is, I'm afraid of Greeks even those bearing gifts."

In the Aeneid, Sinon, the only volunteer for the role, successfully convinces the Trojans that he has been left behind and that the Greeks are gone. Sinon tells the Trojans that the Horse is an offering to the goddess Athena, meant to atone for the previous desecration of her temple at Troy by the Greeks and ensure a safe journey home for the Greek fleet. Sinon tells the Trojans that the Horse was built to be too large for them to take it into their city and gain the favor of Athena for themselves. While questioning Sinon, the Trojan priest Laocoön guesses the plot and warns the Trojans, in Virgil's famous line Timeo Danaos et dona ferentes ("I fear Greeks, even those bearing gifts")—Danai (acc Danaos) or Danaans (Homer's name for the Greeks) being the ones who had built the Trojan Horse. However, the god Poseidon sends two sea serpents to strangle him and his sons Antiphantes and Thymbraeus before any Trojan heeds his warning. King Priam's daughter Cassandra, the soothsayer of Troy, also insists that the horse will be the downfall of the city and its royal family. She too is ignored, hence their doom and loss of the war.

Palaephatus, who sought to rationalize Greek mythology, writes that the traditional story claims the Greeks captured Troy by hiding inside the hollow Wooden Horse, but he rejects this account as too mythical. Instead, he says the Greeks built a Wooden Horse larger than the city gates so that it could not be brought inside. The Greek captains waited in a hollow place near the city, which Palaephatus says was called the "Argive Company" (Ἀργείων λόχος) until his own day. Sinon, a deserter from the Greek army, told the Trojans that a prophecy said the Greeks would return if they did not bring the horse into the city, but would never return if they did. The Trojans tore down part of their wall to bring the horse inside. While they were feasting, the Greeks attacked through the breach in the wall and captured the city.

Pausanias writes that one explanation of Apollo's epithet "Carneus" (Κάρνειος) is that on Mount Ida in Troy there were sacred cornel trees (craneia) in a grove of Apollo, which the Greeks cut down to construct the Trojan Horse. When they learned that the god was angry with them, they propitiated him with sacrifices, and from this they named Apollo Carneus, from craneia, the cornel tree.

In the Bibliotheca (1st or 2nd century AD), it is written that the two serpents who killed Laocoön were sent by Apollo, whom Laocoön had insulted by sleeping with his wife in front of the "divine image". According to Quintus Smyrnaeus in the Posthomerica (c. 4th century AD), which describes the events of the Trojan War after the Illiad, Odysseus thought of building a great wooden horse (the horse being the emblem of Troy), hiding an elite force inside, and fooling the Trojans into wheeling the horse into the city as a trophy. Under the leadership of Epeius, the Greeks built the wooden horse in three days. Odysseus's plan called for one man to remain outside the horse; he would act as though the Greeks had abandoned him, leaving the horse as a gift for the Trojans. An inscription was engraved on the horse reading: "For their return home, the Greeks dedicate this offering to Athena". Then they burned their tents and left to Tenedos by night. Greek soldier Sinon was "abandoned" and was to signal to the Greeks by lighting a beacon.

Ancient authors write that after the Trojan War, Epeius settled in Italy and dedicated the tools with which he had constructed the Trojan Horse to Athena. The Aristotelian Corpus records that these tools were preserved as sacred offerings in Hellenian Athena's sanctuary near Metapontum.

== Factual explanations ==
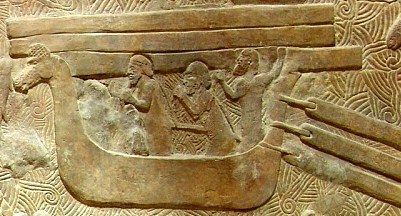
The Phoenician ship called hippos, from the Assyrian city of Khorsabad, 8th century BC

It has been speculated that the story of the Trojan Horse resulted from later poets creatively misunderstanding an actual historical use of a siege engine at Troy. Animal names are often used for military machinery, as with the Roman onager and various Bronze Age Assyrian siege engines which were often covered with dampened horse hides to protect against arrows. Pausanias, who lived in the 2nd century AD, wrote in his book Description of Greece, "That the work of Epeius was a contrivance to make a breach in the Trojan wall is known to everybody who does not attribute utter silliness to the Phrygians"; by the Phrygians, he meant the Trojans. Some authors suggested that the gift might also have been a ship, with warriors hidden inside.

It has been noted that the terms used to put men in the horse are those used by ancient Greek authors to describe the embarkation of men on a ship and that there are analogies between the building of ships by Paris at the beginning of the Trojan saga and the building of the horse at the end; ships are called "sea-horses" once in the Odyssey. Into the 2010s, this view gained support from naval archaeology; ancient text and images show that a Phoenician merchant ship type decorated with a horse head, called hippos ('horse') by Greeks, became very diffuse in the Levant area around the beginning of the 1st millennium BC and was used to trade precious metals and sometimes to pay tribute after the end of a war. That has caused the suggestion that the original story viewed the Greek soldiers hiding inside the hull of such a vessel, possibly disguised as a tribute, and that the term was later misunderstood in the oral transmission of the story, the origin to the Trojan horse myth. Ships with a horsehead decoration, perhaps cult ships, are also represented in artifacts of the Minoan/Mycenaean era; the image on a seal found in the palace of Knossos, dated around 1200 BC, which depicts a ship with oarsmen and a superimposed horse figure, originally interpreted as a representation of horse transport by sea, may in fact be related to this kind of vessel, and even be considered as the first (pre-literary) representation of the Trojan Horse episode.

A more speculative theory, originally proposed by Fritz Schachermeyr, is that the Trojan Horse is a metaphor for a destructive earthquake that damaged the walls of Troy and allowed the Greeks inside. In his theory, the horse represents Poseidon, who as well as being god of the sea was also god of horses and earthquakes. The theory is supported by the fact that archaeological digs have found that Troy VI was heavily damaged in an earthquake but is hard to square with the mythological claim that Poseidon himself built the walls of Troy in the first place.

== Ancient representations ==
Pictorial representations of the Trojan Horse earlier than, or contemporary to, the first literary appearances of the episode can help clarify what was the meaning of the story as perceived by its contemporary audience. There are few ancient (before 480 BC) depictions of the Trojan Horse surviving. The earliest is on a Boeotian fibula dating from about 700 BC. Other early depictions are found on two relief pithoi from the Greek islands Mykonos and Tinos, both generally dated between 675 and 650 BC. The one from Mykonos (see figure at the top of this article) is known as the Mykonos vase. Historian Michael Wood dates the Mykonos vase to the eighth century BC, before the written accounts attributed by tradition to Homer, and posits this as evidence that the story of the Trojan Horse existed before those accounts were written. Other archaic representations of the Trojan horse are found on a Corinthian aryballos dating back to 560 BC (see figure), on a vase fragment to 540 BC (see figure), and on an Etruscan carnelian scarab. An Attic red-figure fragment from a kalyx-krater dated to around 400 BC depicts the scene where the Greeks are climbing down the Trojan Horse, represented by the wooden hatch door.

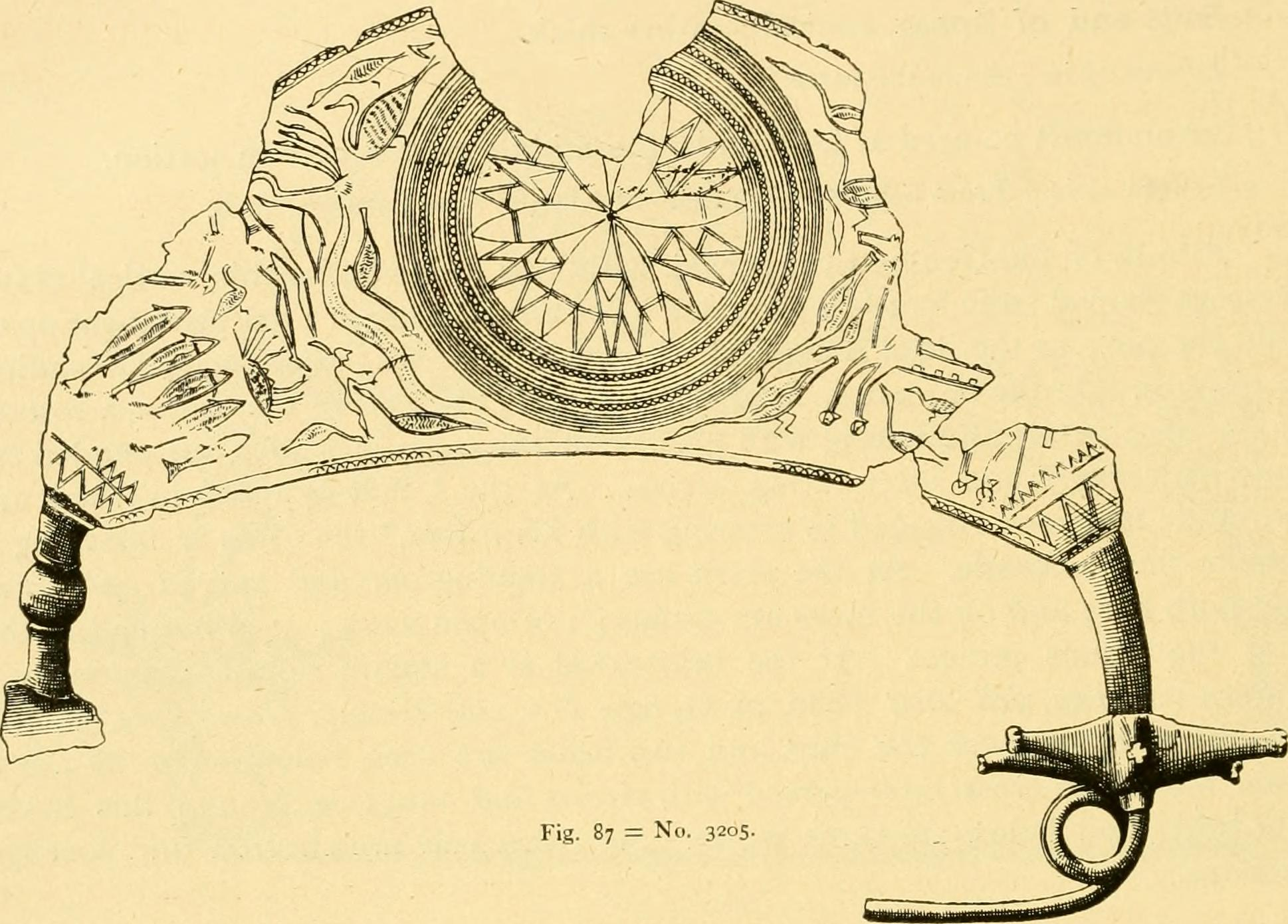
The earliest known depiction of the Trojan Horse, on a bronze fibula (ca. 700 BC), partially visible to the right of the center rosette. Note the wheels and the square openings on the horse's side.

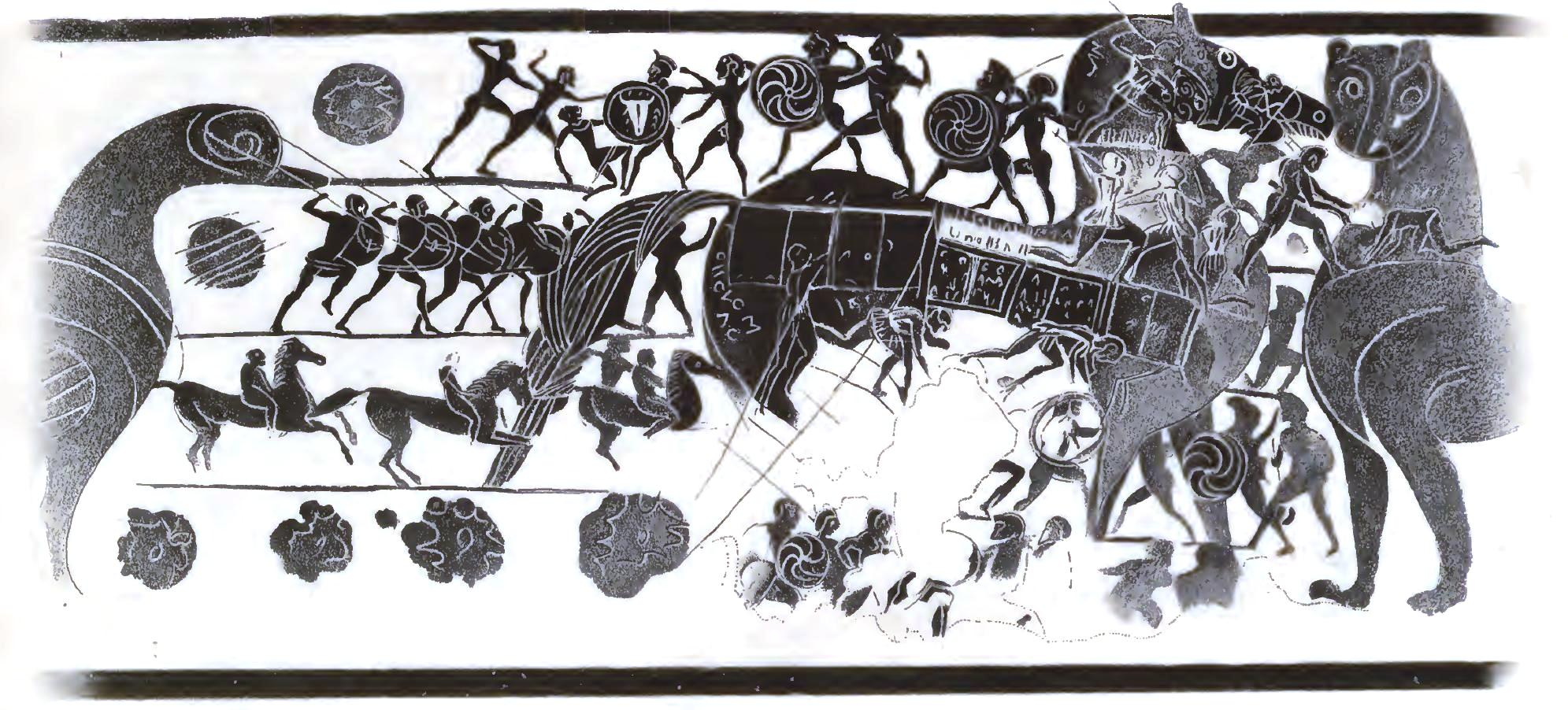
Depiction of the Trojan Horse on a Corinthian aryballos (ca. 560 BC) found in Cerveteri (Italy)

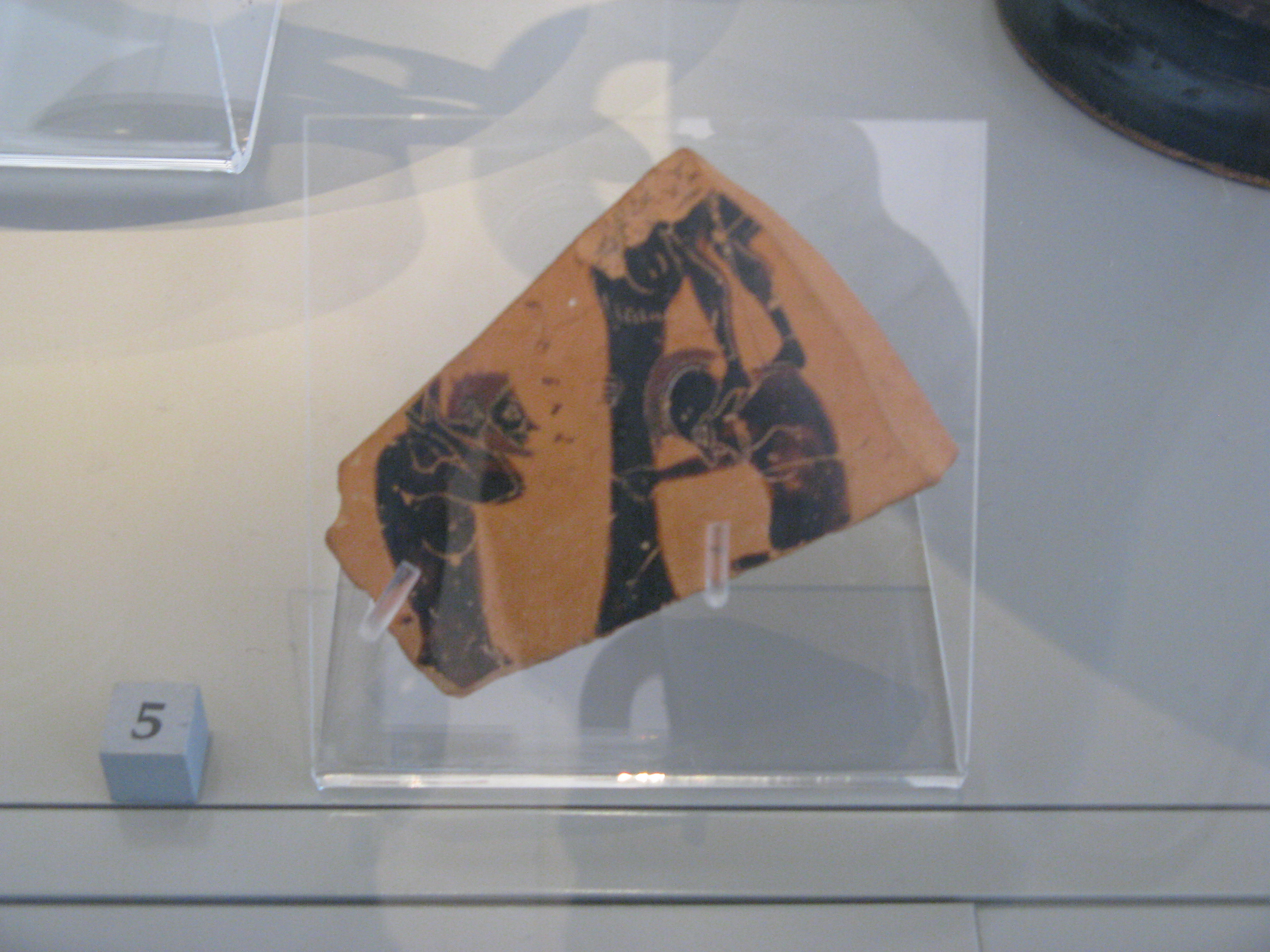
Warriors leaving the Trojan Horse, fragment of an attic black-figure krater from Orbetello (Italy), ca. 540 BC

== Modern metaphorical use ==
The term "Trojan horse" is used metaphorically for any tactic that lures a target into admitting a concealed threat into a protected space by disguising harmful intent behind a benign exterior and enabling deception or subversion from within.
