= Anticlus =

Mythical Greek fighter at Troy

In Greek mythology, Anticlus (Ancient Greek: Ἄντικλος Antiklos), son of Ortyx, was one of the Greek warriors who hid inside the Trojan Horse during the siege of Troy.

== Mythology ==
When the wooden horse was taken within the city, Helen, suspecting a trick by the Greeks, circled the horse imitating the voices of the warriors' wives and sweethearts and calling their names. Anticlus was the only one to not resist and attempt to answer as he heard her talking in the voice of his wife Laodamia, but just as he was on the point of calling out in response, Odysseus shut his mouth with his hands to prevent him from answering, and thus saved his companions. Some say he held Anticlus so tight that he strangled him.

== Legacy ==
The asteroid 7214 Anticlus is named for the mythological figure.
