= Reinhard Stupperich =

German classical archaeologist (born 1951)

- Born: 26 July 1951 (age 75); Münster, Germany
- Occupations: Classical Archaeologist, Academic

Academic background
- Education: Ph.D. in Classical Archaeology
- Alma mater: University of Münster, University of Oxford

Academic work
- Discipline: Classical Archaeology

Reinhard Stupperich (born 26 July 1951 in Münster) is a German classical archaeologist.

The son of the theologian Robert Stupperich, he studied history, Greek, Latin and classical archaeology at the University of Münster from 1970 to 1971. In 1975 he passed the First Philological State Examination for teaching at grammar schools. From 1975 to 1976 he studied classical and provincial Roman archaeology as well as ancient history at the University of Oxford. In the summer of 1976 he was involved in excavations at the Roman villa of Gorhambury in Verulamium and in Mycenaean beehive tombs in Messinia. In 1977 he received his doctorate from Münster for the dissertation Staatsbegräbnis und Privatgrabmal im klassischen Athen ("State funeral and private tomb in classical Athens"). In 1977 and 1979 Stupperich took part in excavations in Oberaden and Messinia. Stupperich received a travel grant from the German Archaeological Institute in 1980–81. From 1983 he worked as a university assistant at the University of Münster. In 1989 he also completed his habilitation in classical archaeology. From 1990 to 2001 he taught as a professor at the University of Mannheim. From 1989 to 1994 he led the excavation in the Westtor necropolis of Assos. At the end of 2001, after the closure of the Classical Archaeology department at the University of Mannheim, he was transferred to the Institut für Klassische Archäologie und Byzantinische Archäologie (Institute of Classical Archaeology and Byzantine Archaeology) at Heidelberg University. He retired in 2019.

In 1994, Stupperich, together with the contemporary historian Heinz A. Richter, founded the journal Thetis. Mannheimer Beiträge zur klassische Archäologie und Geschichte Griechenlands und Zyperns ("Thetis. Mannheim contributions to classical archeology and history of Greece and Cyprus"). In addition, in 1995 the two launched the publication series Peleus. Studien zur Geschichte und Archäologie Griechenlands und Zyperns ("Peleus. Studies on the history and archaeology of Greece and Cyprus"). Since Volume 23 (2016–2018), Thetis has been published by Stupperich alone and under the new subtitle Mannheimer Beiträge zur Archäologie und Geschichte der antiken Mittelmeerkulturen ("Mannheim Contributions to the Archaeology and History of Ancient Mediterranean Cultures"), and is, therefore, dedicated only to topics of classical studies. Since the same time, the series Peleus has been published without Stupperich's participation and is limited to topics in the modern history of Greece and Cyprus.

Stupperich was First Chairman of the Deutscher Archäologen-Verband (German Archaeological Association) from 1998 to 2002 and has been a corresponding member of the German Archaeological Institute since 1995.

== Selected works ==
=== Monographs ===
- Römische Funde in Westfalen und Nordwest-Niedersachsen. ("Roman finds in Westphalia and northwest Lower Saxony.") Münster 1981.
- Staatsbegräbnis und Privatgrabmal im klassischen Athen. ("State funeral and private tomb in classical Athens.") Münster 1977 (University of Münster (North Rhine-Westphalia), dissertation, 1977).

=== Editorships ===
- Ausgrabungen in Assos. ("Excavations in Assos.") Habelt, Bonn 2006, ISBN 3-7749-3464-9.
- Lebendige Antike. Rezeption der Antike in Politik, Kunst und Wissenschaft der Neuzeit ("Living antiquity. Reception of antiquity in politics, art and science of modern times") (= Mannheimer historische Forschungen. Vol. 6). Palatium-Verlag im J-und-J-Verlag, Mannheim 1995, ISBN 3-920671-15-5.
