= Christodorus =

Greek epic poet from Coptos in Egypt

Christodorus (Greek: Χριστόδωρος), a Greek epic poet from Coptos in Egypt, flourished during the reign of Anastasius I (491–518). His father was named Paniskos (Πανίσκος).

According to the Suda, he was the author of Patria (Gr. Πάτρια), accounts of the foundation, history and antiquities of various cities; Lydiaka (Gr. Λυδιακά), the mythical history of Lydia; Isaurica (Gr. Ἰσαυρικά), celebrating Anastasius' victory in the Isaurian War (492–497); three books of epigrams; and many other works.

In addition to two epigrams (Anthol. Pal. vii. 697, 698) we possess a description of eighty statues of gods, heroes and famous men and women in the gymnasium of Zeuxippus at Constantinople (Ἔκφρασις τῶν ἀγαλμάτων τῶν εἰς τὸ δημόσιον γυμνάσιον τὸ ἐπικαλουμένον τοῦ Ζευξίππου). This text, consisting of 416 hexameters, forms the second book of the Palatine Anthology.

The writer's chief models are Homer and Nonnus, whom he follows closely in the structure of his hexameters. Opinions are divided as to the merits of the work. Some critics regard it as of great importance for the history of art and a model of description; others consider it valueless, alike from the historical, mythological and archaeological points of view.

See Friedrich Baumgarten, De Christodoro Poeta Thebano, Bonn (1881), and his article in Pauly-Wissowa's Realencyclopädie der Classischen Altertumswissenschaft, III (1897) 2450–2452; Wilhelm von Christ, Geschichte der griechischen Litteratur (1898); Francesco Tissoni, Cristodoro. Un’introduzione e un commento, Alessandria (2000).
