= Critheïs =

Mother of Homer

Critheïs (KRITH-ay-iss or KRITH-ay-eess, /ˈkrɪθeɪ.ɪs, -iːs/; Ancient Greek: Κριθηΐς, romanized: Kritheïs, occasionally Ancient Greek: Κρηθηϊς, romanized: Kretheïs) was, according to several traditions, the mother of Homer, the poet to whom the Iliad and the Odyssey are attributed. The best-known versions of her story appear in the Life of Homer by the pseudo-Herodotus, (Note: Although existing manuscripts explicitly attribute the Life of Homer to Herodotus of Halicarnassus, and it is written in the Ionic dialect, the work is generally believed to be the work of an unknown author.) and the Life of Homer related by the Pseudo-Plutarch. Her name may be connected with κριθή (krithé), barley.

== Pseudo-Herodotus' Life of Homer ==
Critheïs' father was Menapolus, the son of Ithagenes, the son of Crito. He was a native of Magnesia ad Sipylum, and one of the early colonists of Cumae in Aeolia, where he may have settled on account of his poverty. He married the daughter of Omyretis, who bore him Critheïs. Both Menapolis and his wife died, and Critheïs was placed in the care of Cleanax of Argos, her father's friend.

After some years, Critheïs became pregnant by an unknown suitor. To spare her public shame, Cleanax sent her to his friend, Ismenias of Boeotia, one of the colonists at Smyrna. Critheïs gave birth to a son on the banks of the River Meles, naming him Melesigenes; he did not assume the name Homer until he lost his eyesight in adulthood, when insulted by one of the elders of Cumae, who complained of his colleagues' approval of a blind man—homer, in the Cumaean dialect.

Critheïs remained with Ismenias until she was able to support herself, then lived in poverty until she was engaged as a housekeeper by the schoolmaster Phemius, who taught literature and music. Phemius was paid in flax, and so impressed was he with Critheïs' industry and skill at spinning that he proposed marriage. The two were wed, and Phemius adopted Melesigenes as his son, teaching him, and eventually making the boy his protégé. When Melesigenes had grown to manhood, Phemius died, leaving the young man as his heir. Critheïs died soon after her husband, and her son became famous among the schoolmasters of Smyrna, long before he gained fame as a blind poet.

== Pseudo-Plutarch's Life of Homer ==
Another account of Critheïs appears in a Life of Homer that in antiquity was attributed to Plutarch, probably in error, and which is now grouped with other writings under the title of "Pseudo-Plutarch", although several different authors may be represented by this name. The story of Critheïs is attributed to Ephorus of Cumae, who lived during the fourth century BC, and whose universal history, although widely read in antiquity, has since been entirely lost, except for fragments such as that preserved in the Life of Homer.

According to Ephorus, both Homer and Hesiod were descended from three brothers of Cumae, named Apelles, Maeon, and Dius. To escape his debts, Dius traveled to Ascra in Boeotia, where he married Pycimedes, and fathered Hesiod. When Apelles died, he named his brother Maeon guardian of his daughter, Critheïs. But Maeon deflowered his niece, and to escape the shame of his deed, gave her in marriage to Phemius, the schoolmaster of Smyrna. As in Herodotus, Critheïs gave birth on the banks of the Meles, and named her son Melesigenes; he gained the name Homer when he lost his sight in adulthood, because he required the assistance of guides, or homereuontes in the Ionian dialect.

The Pseudo-Plutarch attributes a different version of the story to Aristotle. Critheïs was a girl of Ios, who conceived a child by one of the local gods who danced with the Muses. Ashamed of her condition, she hid at a place called Aegina, (Note: A locality on Ios, not to be confused with the island of the same name.) where she was taken and enslaved by Smyrnaean pirates who had come ashore. They gave her to Maeon, King of the Lydians, who was captivated by her beauty, and married her. Once again, the child was born on the banks of the Meles, but Critheïs died immediately after childbirth, leaving Maeon to care for her infant son. This he did until his death, not long afterward. The young Melesigenes acquired the pseudonym Homer when the Lydians evacuated Smyrna in response to Aeolian colonization; he chose to homerein, or follow, the people who had reared him.

== Other traditions ==
Several traditions concerning Homer's ancestry are related in the Certamen, or Contest of Homer and Hesiod, which in its present form dates to the second century, but which appears to be based on the Mouseion of Alcidamas, written in the fourth century BC. The Certamen begins with a version told at Smyrna, according to which Homer was the son of the river-god Meles by a nymph, Cretheïs. As in the other accounts, his original name was Melesigenes, and he acquired the name Homer when he lost his sight in adulthood, from the local dialect for a blind man.

The Certamen mentions a number of scholars who offer different opinions as to Homer's father, but as to his mother, merely provides the alternative names of Metis, Themisto, and Eugnetho, or that she was Polycasta, the daughter of Nestor, or the Muse Calliope, or an Ithacan woman who had been enslaved by the Phoenicians. His original name is given as Meles, Melesigenes, or Altes. The emperor Hadrian is said to have asked Pythia to tell him of Homer's origin, and was told that he was born in Ithaca, the son of Telemachus and Epicasta, the daughter of Nestor.

In another tradition, a variant of that related by Ephorus, Homer's mother was a daughter of the river-god Meles, and his father Maeon, here the son, rather than the brother, of Apelles. In this account, Homer is still a cousin of Hesiod, the son of Apelles' brother Dius by Pycimede, the daughter of Apollo. Dius and Apelles were the sons of Melanopus, recalling the Menapolus who was the father of Critheïs in the Pseudo-Herodotan Life of Homer. Melanopus' line is then traced through several generations to Orpheus, Calliope, Apollo, and Poseidon.

Lucian refers to the uncertainty about Homer in his Demosthenis Encomium, nothing that in some accounts, he was the son of Maeon, and in others the river-god Meles; his mother Melanope, or perhaps a dryad.

== Coins ==
The form Κρηθηϊς (Kretheis), with eta instead of iota, is noteworthy as it appears on coins of Cumae. As Homer was claimed by numerous cities with whom he was associated in one tradition or another, the poet's mother became a symbol of Cumae. On these coins, Critheïs is depicted standing upright, clad in chiton and himation, which she holds in place with her right hand, as she bears a sceptre in her left.

== Bibliography ==
- Pseudo-Herodotus, "The Life of Homer", Kenneth R. H. Mackenzie, trans., in The Minor Poems of Homer and a Translation of the Life of Homer, A. Denham & Co., New York, pp. 5–28 (1872).
- Pseudo-Plutarch, The Life of Homer.
- Certamen, or The Contest of Homer and Hesiod.
- Lucian, Demosthenis Encomium (In Praise of Demosthenes).
- August Pauly, Georg Wissowa, et alii, Realencyclopädie der Classischen Altertumswissenschaft (Scientific Encyclopedia of the Knowledge of Classical Antiquities, abbreviated RE or PW), J. B. Metzler, Stuttgart (1894–1980).
- Harper's Dictionary of Classical Literature and Antiquities, Harry Thurston Peck, ed. (Second Edition, 1897).
