= Ancient accounts of Homer =

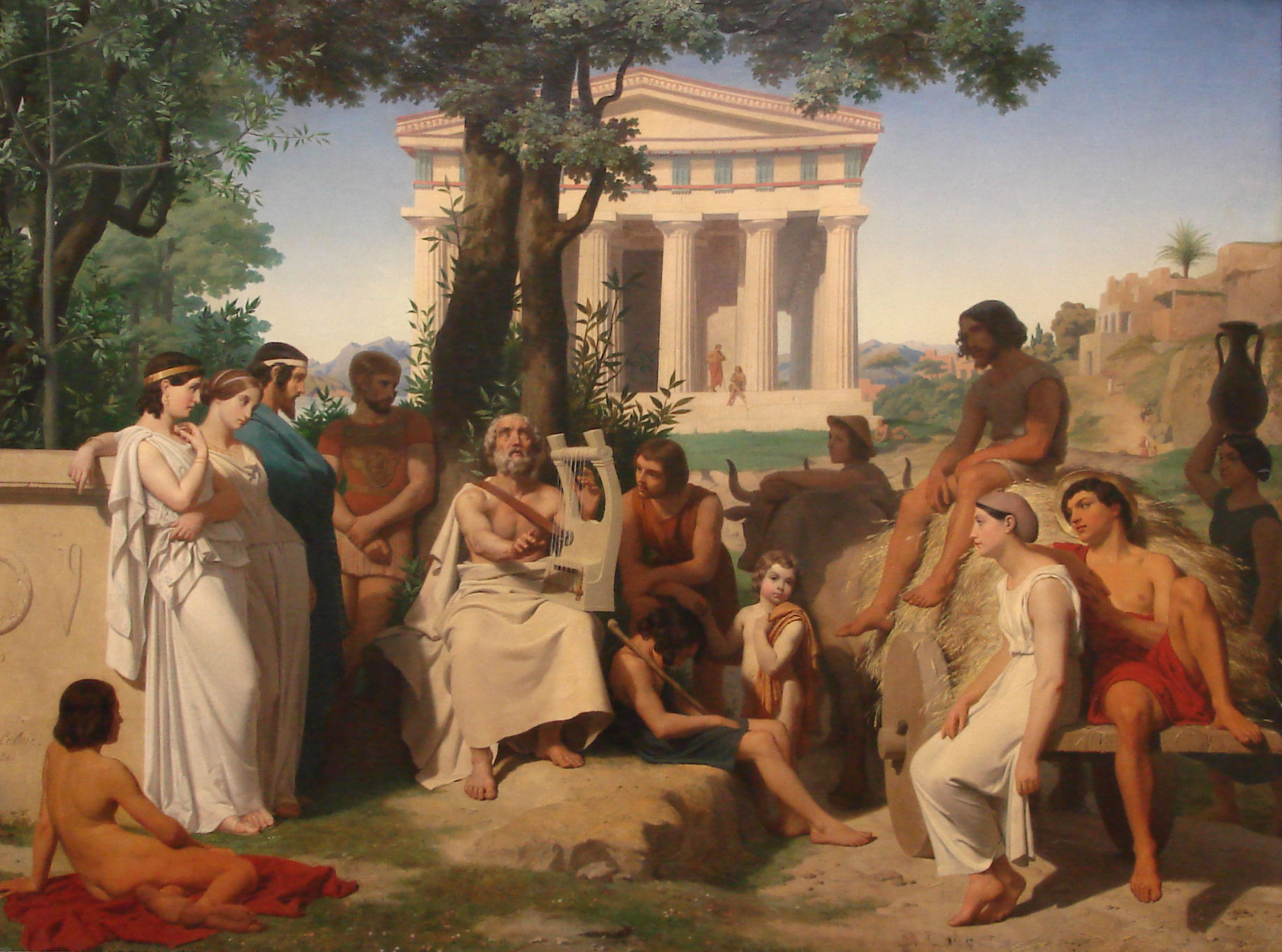
Homer, by Auguste Leloir (1841)

Ancient accounts of Homer include numerous passages in which archaic and classical Greek poets and prose authors mention or allude to Homer. In addition, they include the ten biographies of Homer, often referred to as the Lives.

== Ancient dating of Homer ==
There are no known records directly dating Homer other than his writings of the Odyssey and the Iliad. All accounts are based on tradition. The periodization hinted in written records comes from Herodotus, who maintained that Hesiod and Homer lived no more than 400 years before his own time, therefore around 850 BC. Artemon of Clazomenae, an annalist, gave Arctinus of Miletus, a pupil of Homer, a birth date of 744 BC. It is assumed he lived between 750-700 BC.

== The Lives and the Epigrams ==
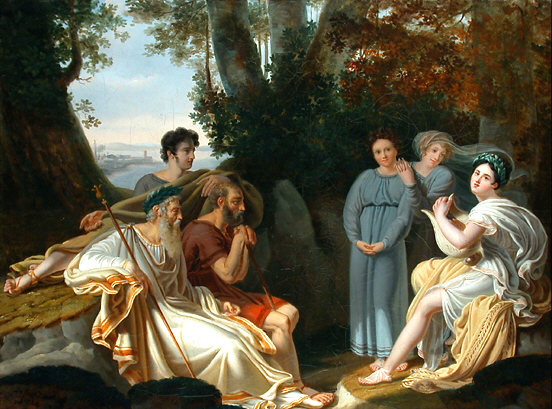
Sappho sings for Homer, Charles Nicolas Rafael Lafond, 1824

There are ten extant Lives of Homer. Eight of these are edited in Georg Westermann's Vitarum Scriptores Graeci minores, including a narrative entitled the Contest of Homer and Hesiod. The longest, Life of Homer, is written in the Ionic dialect and claims to be the work of Herodotus, but this is spurious (see Pseudo-Herodotus). It most likely belongs to the 2nd century AD, although the other Lives are of more recent origin.

The Lives preserve short poems and fragments of verse attributed to Homer, the Epigrams, which were once printed at the end of editions of Homer. They are numbered as they appear in Pseudo-Herodotus. These are easily recognized as popular rhymes, a form of folklore, and in most countries, treasured by the people as a kind of proverb.

In the Homeric epigrams, the subject matter often covers the characteristics of particular localities, for example, Smyrna and Cyme, Erythrae, and Mount Ida; others relate to certain trades or occupations: potters, sailors, fishermen, goat herds, etc., suggesting that they are not the work of any one poet. That they were all ascribed to Homer suggests that they belong to a period in the history of the Ionian and Aeolian colonies when Homer was a name that drew to itself much ancient and popular verse.

The epigrams were the chief source from which the Lives of Homer were derived. Epigram 4 mentions a blind poet, a native of Aeolian Smyrna, through which flows the water of the sacred Meles. Here may be the source of the chief incident of the Herodotean Life, the birth of Homer, named Son of the Meles to conceal a scandalous affair between his mother and an older man who had been appointed her guardian. The epithet Aeolian implies high antiquity, inasmuch as according to Herodotus, Smyrna became Ionian not long before 688 BC. The Ionians had their own version of the story, which may have made Homer come out with the first Athenian colonists.

== Other references on Homer ==
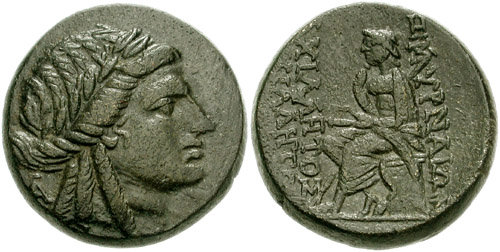
Coin of Smyrna, 2nd/1st century BC; Apollo at left, seated Homer at right.

The same line of argument may be extended to the Hymns and works of the so-called Cyclic poets, the lost early epics, some of which formed the Epic Cycle and Theban Cycle. Thus:

1. The hymn to the Delian Apollo ends with an address of the poet to his audience. When any stranger comes and asks who the sweetest singer is, they are to answer with one voice, "The blind man that dwells in rocky Chios; his songs deserve the prize for all time to come." Thucydides, who quotes this passage to show the ancient character of the Delian festival, seems to have no doubt about the Homeric authorship of the hymn. Many accounts say that he was from Smyrna and lived in Chios later in his life.
2. The Margites, a humorous poem known as a reputed work of Homer down to the time of Aristotle, began with the words, "There came to Colophon an old man, a divine singer, servant of the Muses and Apollo." Hence the claim of Colophon to be the native city of Homer, a claim supported in the early times of Homeric learning by the Colophonian poet and grammarian Antimachus. The Suda reports Homer being a Smyrnaean that was taken as captive to the Colophonians in war, hence the name Ὅμηρος, which in Greek means "captive". Homer's name originating from him being a captive is widely reported.
3. The poem called the Cypria was said to have been given by Homer to his son-in-law Stasinus of Cyprus as dowry. The connection with Cyprus appears further in the predominance given in the poem to Aphrodite.
4. The Little Iliad and the Phocais, according to the pseudo-Herodotean life, were composed by Homer when he lived at Phocaea with a certain Thestorides, who carried them off to Chios and there gained fame by reciting them as his own. The name Thestorides occurs in Epigram 5.
5. A similar story was told about the poem called the Capture of Oechalia, the subject of which was one of the exploits of Heracles. It passed under the name of Creophylus of Samos, a friend or (as some said) a son-in-law of Homer, and was sometimes said to have been given to Creophylus by Homer in return for hospitality.
6. The Thebaid was confidently counted as the work of Homer. As to the Epigoni, which carried on the Theban story, there was less certainty.

These indications render it probable that the stories connecting Homer with different cities and islands grew up after his poems had become known and famous, especially in the new and flourishing colonies of Aeolis and Ionia. The contention for Homer may have begun at a time when his real history was lost, and he had become a sort of mythical figure, an anonymous hero, or a personification of a great school of poetry.

== Arctinus of Miletus ==
A confirmation of this view from the negative side is furnished by the chief city among the Asiatic colonies of Greece, Miletus. There has so far been no legend that claims about a visit from Homer to Miletus. Yet, Arctinus of Miletus was said to have been a disciple of Homer and was certainly one of the earliest and most considerable of the Cyclic poets. His Aethiopis was composed as a sequel to the Iliad and the structure and general character of his poems show that he took the Iliad as his model. Yet, in his case, there is no indication of disputed authorship which is the case with other Cyclic poems. Possibly, Arctinus was never so far forgotten that his poems became the subject of dispute.

== See also ==
- Homeridae
- Life of Homer (Pseudo-Herodotus)
