= Kiln (poem) =

Ancient Greek hexameter poem

The "Kiln" (Ancient Greek: Κάμινος, Kaminos), or "Potters" (Κεραμεῖς, Kerameis), is a 23-line hexameter poem that was variously attributed to Homer or Hesiod during antiquity, but is not considered the work of either poet by modern scholars. The poem constitutes an appeal to Athena to grant success to certain unnamed potters if they pay for the poet's song, followed by a series of curses to be enacted should they not reimburse him. It has been included among the Epigrams of Homer, as epigram XIV.

== Authorship ==
Although the "Kiln" is printed among the Hesiodic fragments, there is little reason to assume that it was widely attributed to Hesiod. In discussing a word for "basket" known as a κάναστρον (kanastron), Pollux cites the third verse of the poem, calling it the "Potters" and giving a tentative ascription to Hesiod:

"Baskets" [are mentioned by] the author of the "Potters", which some attribute to Hesiod. In any event, he says:

"May the cups turn a fine black, and all the baskets"

τὰ δὲ κάναστρα τοῦ ποιήσαντος τοὺς Κεραμέας, οὕς τινες Ἡσιόδῳ προσνέμουσιν· λέγει γοῦν
"εὖ δὲ μελανθεῖεν κότυλοι καὶ πάντα κάναστρα"

The other witnesses to the poem all belong to the Homeric biographical tradition, and it seems that the "Kiln" was composed during the 6th or 5th century BCE as part of a lost work on Homer that predates the surviving texts. According to the pseudo-Herodotean Life of Homer, the great bard was traveling through the eastern Mediterranean and happened to land on the island of Samos. While there he encountered a group of potters who, aware of his fame, offered Homer some of their wares and whatever else they had on hand if he would sing for them. In response, Homer sang the "Kiln".

== Synopsis ==
The poem opens with a dual address to Athena and the poet's audience:

If you are going to pay for my singing, O potters,
then come, Athena, and hold your hand over the kiln

Εἰ μὲν δώσετε μισθὸν ἀοιδῆς, ὦ κεραμῆες,
δεῦρ' ἄγ' Ἀθηναίη, καὶ ὑπέρσχεθε χεῖρα καμίνου

The goddess' potential guardianship is described next: she would make the potter's cups and dishes well-blackened and well-baked, and would make sure that these wares sold for a fair price and in large quantity in the market place, making the potters much profit (lines 3–6). Should the poet not profit as promised, he threatens to "invoke all of the kiln gremlins, Smasher and Crasher, Overblaze and Shakeapart and Underbake, who does this craft [pottery] much harm." Once these gremlins have cast the kiln into confusion and begun wasting the wares, mythological mischief is threatened: Circe will come and harm the potters with her drugs, and Chiron will lead in a host of centaurs to smash kiln and crafts alike (lines 15–20). The poem closes with the poet envisioning himself enjoying the destruction and offers one final curse:

I shall enjoy seeing their craft so bedevilled.
And whoever peeps over the top [of the kiln], may all his face
be scorched, to teach them all to behave decently.

γηθήσω δ' ὁρόων αὐτῶν κακοδαίμονα τέχνην.
ὃς δέ χ' ὑπερκύψηι, περὶ τούτου πᾶν τὸ πρόσωπον
φλεχθείη, ὡς πάντες ἐπίστωντ' αἴσιμα ῥέζειν.

== Select editions and translations ==
=== Critical editions ===
- Allen, T.W. (1912), Homeri opera. Tomus V: Hymni, Cyclus, Fragmenta, Margites, Batrachomyomachia, Vitae, Oxford, ISBN 0-19-814534-9.
- Merkelbach, R.; West, M.L. (1967), Fragmenta Hesiodea, Oxford, ISBN 0-19-814171-8.

=== Translations ===
- Evelyn-White, H.G. (1936), Hesiod, the Homeric Hymns, and Homerica, Loeb Classical Library, vol. 57 (3rd rev. ed.), Cambridge, MA, ISBN 978-0-674-99063-0. (The link is to the 1st edition of 1914.)
- West, M.L. (2003), Homeric Hymns, Homeric Apocrypha, Lives of Homer, Loeb Classical Library, vol. 496, Cambridge, MA, ISBN 978-0-674-99606-9.

== Bibliography ==
- Montanari, F.; Rengakos, A.; Tsagalis, C. (2009), Brill's Companion to Hesiod, Leiden, ISBN 978-9004-17840-3.
  - Cingano, E., "The Hesiodic Corpus", in Montanari, Rengakos & Tsagalis (2009), pp. 91–130.
- Most, G. W. (2006), Hesiod: Theogony, Works and Days, Testimonia, Loeb Classical Library, vol. 57, Cambridge, MA, ISBN 978-0-674-99622-9.
