= Epigrams (Homer) =

Seventeen Epigrams were attributed to Homer in antiquity. They are preserved in a number of texts, including the Life of Homer (Pseudo-Herodotus), the Contest of Homer and Hesiod, and the Homeric Hymns.

The Epigrams are thought to antedate the Pseudo-Herodotian Life of Homer which was apparently written around the epigrams to create appropriate context. Epigram III on Midas of Larissa has also been attributed to Cleobulus of Lindus, who was considered to be one of the Seven Sages of Greece. Epigram XIV was attributed to Hesiod by Julius Pollux and Epigram XI has been described as "purely Hesoidic".

Epigram III is also partially quoted in Plato, Phaedrus 264d, though it is not ascribed to Homer.

Epigrams III, XIII and XVII are included in the Contest of Homer and Hesiod and epigram I is included in some manuscripts of the Homeric Hymns. The Epigrams were included in the editio princeps of Homer’s works printed by Demetrius Chalchondyles in 1488.

== See also ==
- Daemones Ceramici
- Kiln
- Epigrams (Plato)
