= Life of Homer =

Life of Homer, in Latin Vita Homeri, may refer to:

- Any of ten ancient accounts of Homer known as the Lives, of which the most famous is:
  - Life of Homer (Pseudo-Herodotus)
- Vita Homeri by Pier Candido Decembrio (1440)
