= Caravan Bridge =

Bridge built in ancient Greece

Coordinates: 38.422058°N 27.152059°E

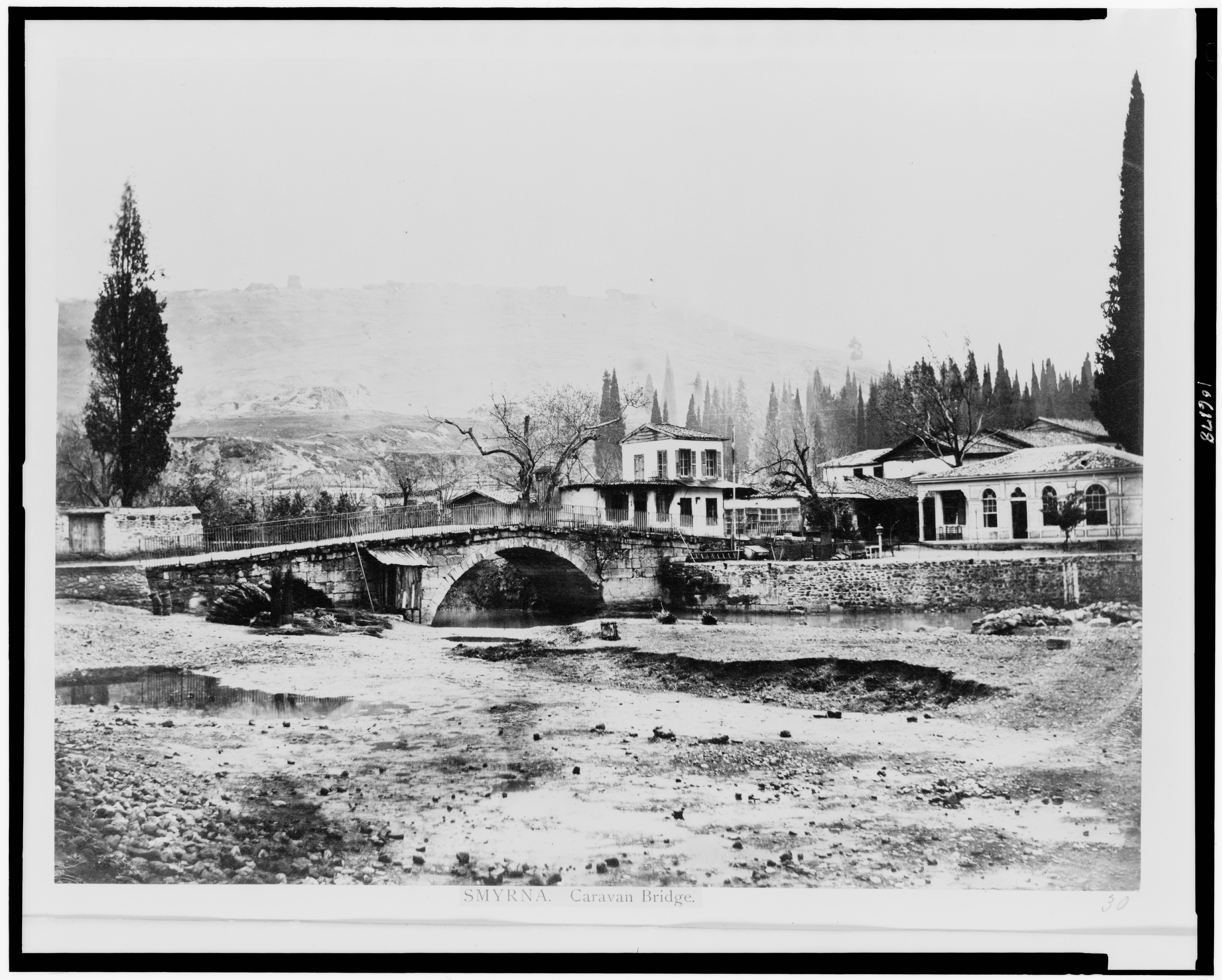
Photograph, ca. 1860-1890

Caravan Bridge (Turkish: Kervan Köprüsü) is an ancient bridge in the city of İzmir, Turkey. It was built in approximately 850 BC over the Meles river, and is one of the oldest man-made structures in continuous use. In antiquity, the River Meles was said to be the birthplace of Homer, and both the river and the bridge were featured in Homer's work.
