= Barry Powell =

Barry Powell may refer to:

- Barry Powell (footballer) (born 1954), English footballer
- Barry B. Powell (born 1942), American professor and author
- Barry Powell, administrator of Malew
