= Pigres of Halicarnassus =

Ancient Greek poet

Pigres (Greek: Πίγρης), was a native of Halicarnassus, and either the brother or the son of Artemisia, satrap of Caria. He is spoken of by the Suda as the author of the Margites and the Batrachomyomachia. (Note: The author of the lemma "Pigres", however, makes the mistake of conflating this Artemisia, the advisor of Xerxes in the Histories of Herodotus, with another Artemisia, the wife of Mausolus.) The latter poem is also attributed to him by Plutarch and was probably his work. One of his feats was inserting a pentameter line after each hexameter in the Iliad, thus:

Μῆνιν ἄειδε θεὰ Πηληϊάδεω Ἀχιλῆος.
Μοῦσα· σὺ γὰρ πάσης πείρατ᾽ ἔχεις σοφίης.

Sing, goddess, of the ruinous wrath of Achilles, son of Peleus.
Muse, for you possess the means of all wisdom.

Bode believes that the Margites, though not composed by Pigres, suffered some alterations at his hands, and in that altered shape passed down to posterity. Some suppose that the iambic lines, which alternated with the hexameters in the Margites, were inserted by Pigres. He was the first poet, apparently, who introduced the iambic trimeter.

== In literature ==
Pigres is one of the many historical characters featured in Gore Vidal's novel Creation. In Vidal's depiction, Pigres was Artemisia's brother - excluded by her from succession to their father's throne, living in fear of her and taking up comic poetry as a refuge.
