= Statue of Penelope =

Parthian statue

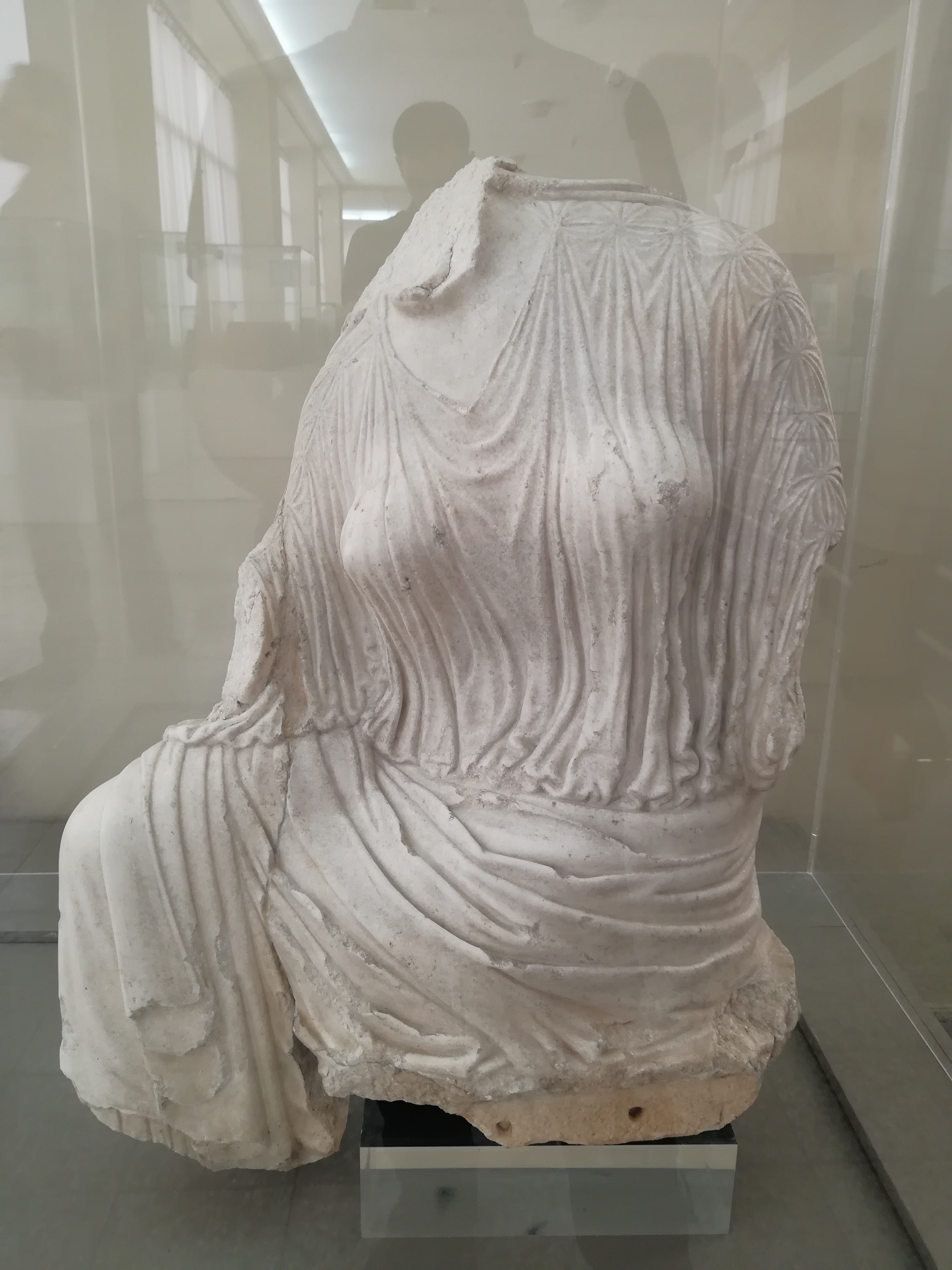
- Material: Marble
- Created: 5th century BC
- Discovered: Persepolis, Iran
- Present location: National Museum of Iran

The Statue of Penelope is a marble statue which was discovered in Persepolis, housed at National Museum of Iran. It is one of the world's only four remaining statues of Homer's Penelope, with the other three kept at Vatican Museum and Capitoline Museum in Rome. It is a rare example of Greek sculpture found on Persian soil.

Experts have two theories about how the statue ended up in Iran. One is that it was brought to Persepolis by Xerxes the Great after the conquest of Athens in 480 BC (Battle of Thermopylae). And the second, that it was gifted by the Greeks to the Persians as a show of goodwill.

During a joint exhibition by Iran and Italy in 2015, studies were conducted on the four statues, and it was confirmed that this is the oldest, dating back to the 5th century BC. The statue was exhibited at Prada Foundation in Milan for around 4 months, and all the four later went on display at the National Museum of Iran in 2016. The statue was excavated in 1945, lay scattered in three fragments at the Persepolis Treasury.
