= Margites =

Ancient Greek poem

The Margites (Ancient Greek: Μαργίτης) is a comic mock-epic ascribed to Homer that is largely lost. From references to the work that survived, it is known that its central character is an exceedingly stupid man named Margites (from ancient Greek μάργος, margos, "raving, mad; lustful"), who was so dense he did not know which parent had given birth to him. His name gave rise to the adjective margitomanēs (μαργιτομανής), "mad as Margites", used by Philodemus.

The work, among a mixed genre of works loosely labelled "Homerica" in antiquity, was commonly attributed to Homer, as by Aristotle (Poetics 13.92)—"His Margites indeed provides an analogy: as are the Iliad and Odyssey to our tragedies, so is the Margites to our comedies"—and Harpocration. Basil of Caesarea writes that the work is attributed to Homer but that he is unsure regarding this attribution. However, the massive medieval Greek encyclopaedia called the Suda attributed the Margites to Pigres, a Greek poet of Halicarnassus.

It is written in mixed hexameter and iambic lines, an oddity characteristic also of the Batrachomyomachia (likewise attributed to Pigres), which inserts a pentameter line after each hexameter of the Iliad as a curious literary game.

Margites was famous in the ancient world, but only the following lines survive:

There came to Kolophon an old man and divine singer, a servant of the Muses and of far-shooting Apollon. In his dear hands he held a sweet-toned lyre.

He knew many things but knew all badly... The gods had taught him neither to dig nor to plow, nor any other skill; he failed in every craft.

The fox knows many a wile; but the hedge-hog's one trick can beat them all.

Due to the Margites character, the Greeks used the word as an insult to describe foolish and useless people. Demosthenes called Alexander the Great Margites in order to insult and degrade him.

== Bibliography ==
- Smith, William. Dictionary of Greek and Roman Biography and Mythology, 1870, article on Margites, v. 2, page 949.
- West, M.L. Iambi et Elegi Graeci ante Alexandrum cantati, vol. II. Oxford: Oxford University Press, 1992. ISBN 0-19-814096-7.
