= Phocais =

Lost ancient Greek epic poem ascribed to Homer

The Phocais (Ancient Greek: Φωκαΐς) was an ancient Greek epic attributed to Homer. In the Life of Homer, a biography of Homer falsely attributed to Herodotus, it was said to have been written while Homer lived at Phocaea with a man named Thestorides; however, whether Thestorides actually existed and where he lived is highly suspect. Like all Homeric works, its true author is unknown; today only a single fragment (three to four sentences of text) claiming its existence survives. Along with other works of Homerica, the extant fragment describing the work is available in English translation in the Loeb Classical Library, Volume 57, some early editions of which are in the public domain.
