= Thestorides of Phocaea =

Ancient Greek poet

Thestorides of Phocaea (Greek: Θεστορίδης) was a legendary or semi-legendary early Greek poet, one of those to whom the epic Little Iliad was ascribed. Modern scholar Martin Litchfield West suggested that the tradition might preserve a memory of a real poet or rhapsode.

Thestorides figures as a major character in Life of Homer, a largely fictional ancient biography falsely attributed to Herodotus. According to the narrative, Thestorides was a schoolteacher in Phocaea who offered to support the impoverished Homer if he allowed Thestorides to write down his poems. While living with him, Homer supposedly composed the Little Iliad and the Phocais. Thestorides recorded the poems from Homer's dictation and then left Phocaea with the texts. This episode is unusual among ancient accounts of Homer because it explicitly depicts his poetry being taken down in writing from oral dictation. The Life continues that Thestorides moved to Chios, founded a school and performed Homer's poems as his own, gaining praise and money. After hearing reports of this, Homer travelled to Chios. When Thestorides learned that Homer had arrived, he hastily left the island.

== Bibliography ==
- Dalby, Andrew (2006), Rediscovering Homer, New York, London: Norton, ISBN 0-393-05788-7
- Lefkowitz, Mary R. (1981), The lives of the Greek poets, London: Duckworth, ISBN 0-7156-1590-4
