= Timarchus of Miletus =

3rd-century BC tyrant of the Greek city of Miletus

Timarchus or Timarch (Ancient Greek: Τίμαρχος) was a tyrant of the ancient Greek city of Miletus in the 3rd century BC. He was put in power after the Ptolemaic conquest of Miletus in 279 BC. With Ptolemy I Epigone he led a revolt against Ptolemy II Philadelphus of Egypt in 259 BC. He was slain the next year by the Seleucid king Antiochus II Theos during the course of the Second Syrian War between the Seleucid Empire and Ptolemaic Egypt. The grateful citizens of Miletus awarded the surname of "Theos" (God) to Antiochus II for liberating their city.
