= River Meles =

River in İzmir, Turkey

The River Meles (Greek: Μέλης) (more appropriately described as "Meles Brook") is a stream charged with history and famous in literature, especially by virtue of being associated in a common and consistent tradition with Homer's birth and works. It flowed by the ancient city of Smyrna, and a namesake of it flows through the present-day metropolitan center of İzmir.

The exact location of the Homeric Meles and whether or not that stream corresponds to the one (actually the ones, since different sources, even at official level, have adopted different streams under that name) called Meles today continues to be subject to contradictory views among scholars and other concerned parties.

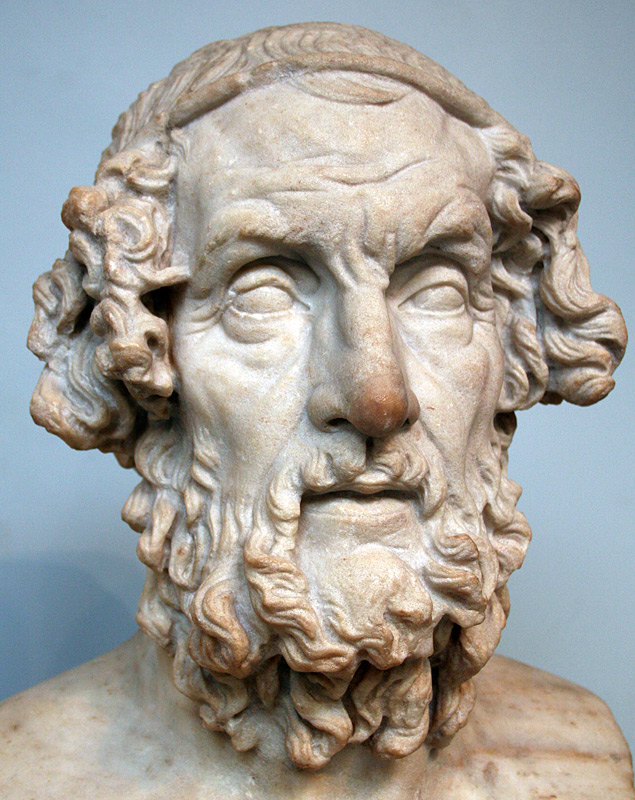
Homer was also called Melesigenes (son of Meles) by the name of the brook which flowed by Smyrna, and today, through İzmir.

== Homer's Meles ==
Homer is connected with the valley of Smyrna and the banks of the Meles. His figure was one of the stock types on coins of Smyrna, one class of which showed the poet sitting, holding a volumen on his knees, and supporting his chin on his right hand was called "Homerian" by numismatists. The epithet Melesigenes (which means, "son of Meles" was applied to him. The cave where he was to compose his poems was described as being near the source of the river, his temple, the Homereion, stood on its banks.

== Present-day Meles ==
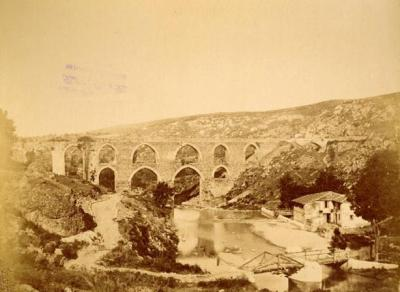
An 1880 photograph showing the Roman-built (also used in Byzantine and Ottoman times) Kızılçullu aqueducts on the present-day and historically very debatable Meles Brook in Buca, İzmir, near which a cave associated with Homer is also found.

No fewer than six small streams flow into the Gulf of İzmir between the northeastern tip of its outlying waters, where old Smyrna was built, to the city's ancient hilltop castle commanding the inner Gulf's southern shores (Kadifekale today, Pagus and Mount Pagus in ancient times) on the slopes of which, according to tradition, Alexander the Great had the dream of refounding a new Smyrna.

Among these, the stream which rises ten miles south of the castle and flows round the base of its mountain had acquired the name of Meles in modern times and kept it until recently. This stream was alternatively called "Kemer Brook" (Kemer Çayı) or, especially in western sources, as the "Caravan Bridge Brook", by the name of a historic bridge, also celebrated in literature, which checked the entry into the city of İzmir throughout the 19th century. The flow of this stream varies from a full rush of water in winter to a trickle, even a dry bed, in summer.

In the light of descriptions by Aelius Aristides and other accounts dating from the Roman imperial age, this stream seems, in fact, to be the weakest candidate for association with Homer's Meles. Roman-era sources describe Meles as a very short stream rising at a number of springs close together in the outskirts of the city to form immediately a circular-shaped lake and joining the sea within eyeview, with a steady and equal flow, alike in summer and winter and navigable almost until its source.

The description applies remarkably well to the stream which reaches the sea at a short distance east of the "19th century Kemer – Caravan Bridge Meles" stream, and which is not even a stream in the strict sense of the word, but consist of numerous sources which form at once a large pool, all of which is known under the general name of Halkapınar (meaning, the Circular Springs). The pond embraces today İzmir's industrial neighborhood of the same name and is highly polluted nowadays, fouled especially on its way to the sea, although, until barely a few decades ago, it was a popular summer resort from where an important part of İzmir's drinking water was also provided. The discovery in the 19th century of one complete statue and the head of another, which were thought to represent Artemis, gave way to the name "Diana's Baths" attached to it, while no other traces with claim to antiquity was found in the area.

Although Halkapınar corresponds admirably to ancient accounts, some scholars continue to doubt whether it is also the Meles of the early city of Smyrna. There is no natural cave at Halkapınar where Homer would have sat down to write, but there is one on the "Kemer – Caravan Bridge Meles", near the aqueducts in İzmir's Buca district and now known as "Kızılçullu Aqueducts" (Kızılçullu Su Kemerleri), which were built by the Romans and extensively used and well preserved by their successors in the region. Because of the existence of the cave in Buca and with Kemer Brook flowing through İzmir's neighboring district of Konak before reaching the sea, these two localities are particularly insistent in their claims for associating Meles with the westernmost stream, for understandable reasons.

A third candidate takes as basis an anonymous Homeric hymn of unknown date to Artemis which relates that the goddess, "having watered her horses in deep-reeded Meles, drove swiftly through Smyrna to Klaros rich in vines". It has been argued that, if the hymn refers to old Smyrna in its northeastern corner of the Gulf, and if the goddess came to Meles before she reached Smyrna, then Meles could be the stream which springs from Mount Yamanlar to the north and enters the sea close to the Bayraklı site. Furthermore, a "Homeros Valley", several kilometers from the nearest possible Meles and which is not located in the basin of any of them, was recently set up as a recreational area by the Municipality of Greater İzmir.

== Sources ==
- Ekrem Akurgal (2002). Ancient Civilizations and Ruins of Turkey: From Prehistoric Times Until the End of the Roman Empire. Kegan Paul. ISBN 0-7103-0776-4.
- George E. Bean (1967). Aegean Turkey: An archaeological guide. London: Ernest Benn. ISBN 978-0-510-03200-5.
- Cecil John Cadoux (1938). Ancient Smyrna: A History of the City from the Earliest Times to 324 A.D. Blackwell Publishing.
