= Alcidamas =

4th-century BC Greek sophist and rhetorician

Alcidamas (Ancient Greek: Ἀλκιδάμας), of Elaea, in Aeolis, was a Greek sophist and rhetorician, who flourished in the 4th century BC.

== Life ==
He was the pupil and successor of Gorgias and taught at Athens at the same time as Isocrates, to whom he was a rival and opponent. We possess two declamations under his name: On Sophists (Περὶ Σοφιστῶν), directed against Isocrates and setting forth the superiority of extempore over written speeches (a more recently discovered fragment of another speech against Isocrates is probably of later date); Odysseus (perhaps spurious) in which Odysseus accuses Palamedes of treachery during the siege of Troy.

According to Alcidamas, the highest aim of the orator was the power of speaking ex tempore on every conceivable subject. Aristotle (Rhet. iii. 3) criticizes his writings as characterized by pomposity of style and an extravagant use of poetical epithets and compounds and far-fetched metaphors.

Of other works only fragments and the titles have survived: Messeniakos, advocating the freedom of the Messenians and containing the sentiment that "God has left all men free; nature has made no man a slave"; a Eulogy of Death, in consideration of the wide extent of human sufferings; a Techne or instruction-book in the art of rhetoric; and a Phusikos logos. Lastly, his Mouseion (a word invoking the Muses) seems to have contained the narrative of the Contest of Homer and Hesiod, of which the version that has survived is the work of a grammarian in the time of Hadrian, based on Alcidamas. This hypothesis of the contents of the Mouseion, originally suggested by Nietzsche (Rheinisches Museum 25 (1870) & 28 (1873)), appears to have been confirmed by three papyrus finds—one 3rd century BC (Flinders Petrie Papyri, ed. Mahaffy, 1891, pl. xxv.), one 2nd century BC (Basil Mandilaras, 'A new papyrus fragment of the Certamen Homeri et Hesiodi' Platon 42 (1990) 45–51) and one 2nd or 3rd century AD (University of Michigan pap. 2754: Winter, J. G., 'A New Fragment on the Life of Homer' TAPA 56 (1925) 120–129).
