= Phemius =

Mythical bard in Homer

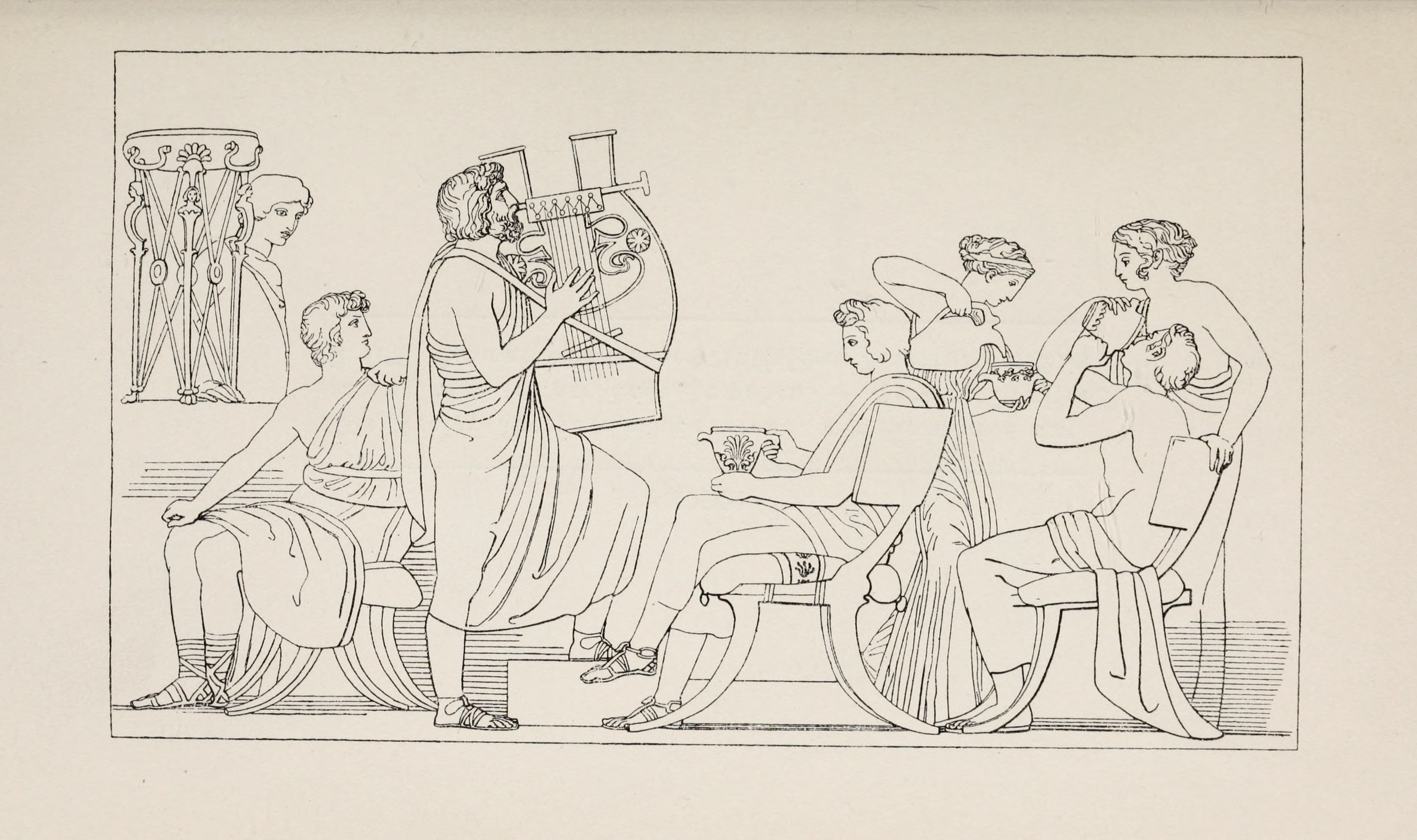
The singer Phemius sings to the suitors. – Homer, Odyssey I. 325. Schwab, Legends of Classical Antiquity II. 208.

In Homer's epic poem the Odyssey, Phemius (/ˈfiːmiəs/; Ancient Greek: Φήμιος, romanized: Phḗmios), son of Terpes/Terpius, is an Ithacan poet who performs narrative songs in the house of the absent Odysseus.

== Mythology ==
Phemius's audience is made up largely of the suitors of Penelope, who live in the house while attempting to persuade her to marry one of them. In Book 1 of the poem, Phemius performs at their request a version of the theme The Return from Troy (a theme that actually existed as a written poem, probably at a slightly later date). The performance is heard by Penelope. The story distresses her, since it is a reminder that her own husband has still not returned, and she emerges from her room to ask Phemius to choose a less painful theme. The proposal is overruled by her son Telemachus, because he thinks that a singer shouldn't be forbidden to sing what his heart tells him to sing, and because it is Telemachus' right as householder to decide, not his mother's.

We are told that Phemius performed for the suitors "unwillingly", and so, towards the end of the poem, when all the suitors have been killed, Phemius pleads with Odysseus to spare his life, citing this very reason (among others) in his own defence: Telemachus confirms this, and Odysseus relents.

In Book 23, Odysseus instructs Phemius to perform wedding songs, "as loud as his lyre can play", in order to delay news of the suitors' deaths from spreading until Odysseus and Telemachus can escape to their farm.

== See also ==
- Demodocus (Odyssey character)
