= Barry B. Powell =

American classical scholar (born 1942)

Barry Bruce Powell (born 1942) is an American classical scholar who is the author of the textbook Classical Myth. Trained at Berkeley and Harvard, he is a specialist in Homer and in the history of writing. Powell is currently the Halls-Bascom Professor of Classics Emeritus at the University of Wisconsin–Madison.

== Work ==
Powell's study Homer and the Origin of the Greek Alphabet advances the controversial thesis that a single man invented the Greek alphabet expressly in order to record the poems of Homer. His Writing: Theory and History of the Technology of Civilization (Wiley-Blackwell 2009) rejects the standard theories of the origins of both Sumerian cuneiform and the Phoenician alphabet as deriving from pictograms. He attempts to create a scientific terminology and taxonomy for the study of writing.

Powell has also translated a number of works, including the Iliad, the Odyssey, the Aeneid and the poems of Hesiod. His Greek Poems to the Gods includes translation and commentary on Greek hymns from Homer to Proclus.

== Bibliography ==
- Homer and the Origin of the Greek Alphabet, Cambridge University Press, 1991
- Writing and the Origins of Greek Literature, Cambridge University Press, 2003
- Homer, Wiley-Blackwell, 2004, 2nd ed. 2007
- Writing: Theory and History of the Technology of Civilization, Wiley-Blackwell, 2009
- Classical Myth, eighth edition, Pearson, 2014

=== Translations ===
- The Iliad, Oxford University Press, 2013
- The Odyssey, Oxford University Press, 2014
- Vergil's Aeneid, Oxford University Press, 2015
- The Poems of Hesiod: Theogony, Works and Days, the Shield of Heracles, University of California Press 2017
- Greek Poems to the Gods, University of California Press, 2021
