= Life of Homer (Pseudo-Herodotus) =

Pseudonymous ancient biography of Homer

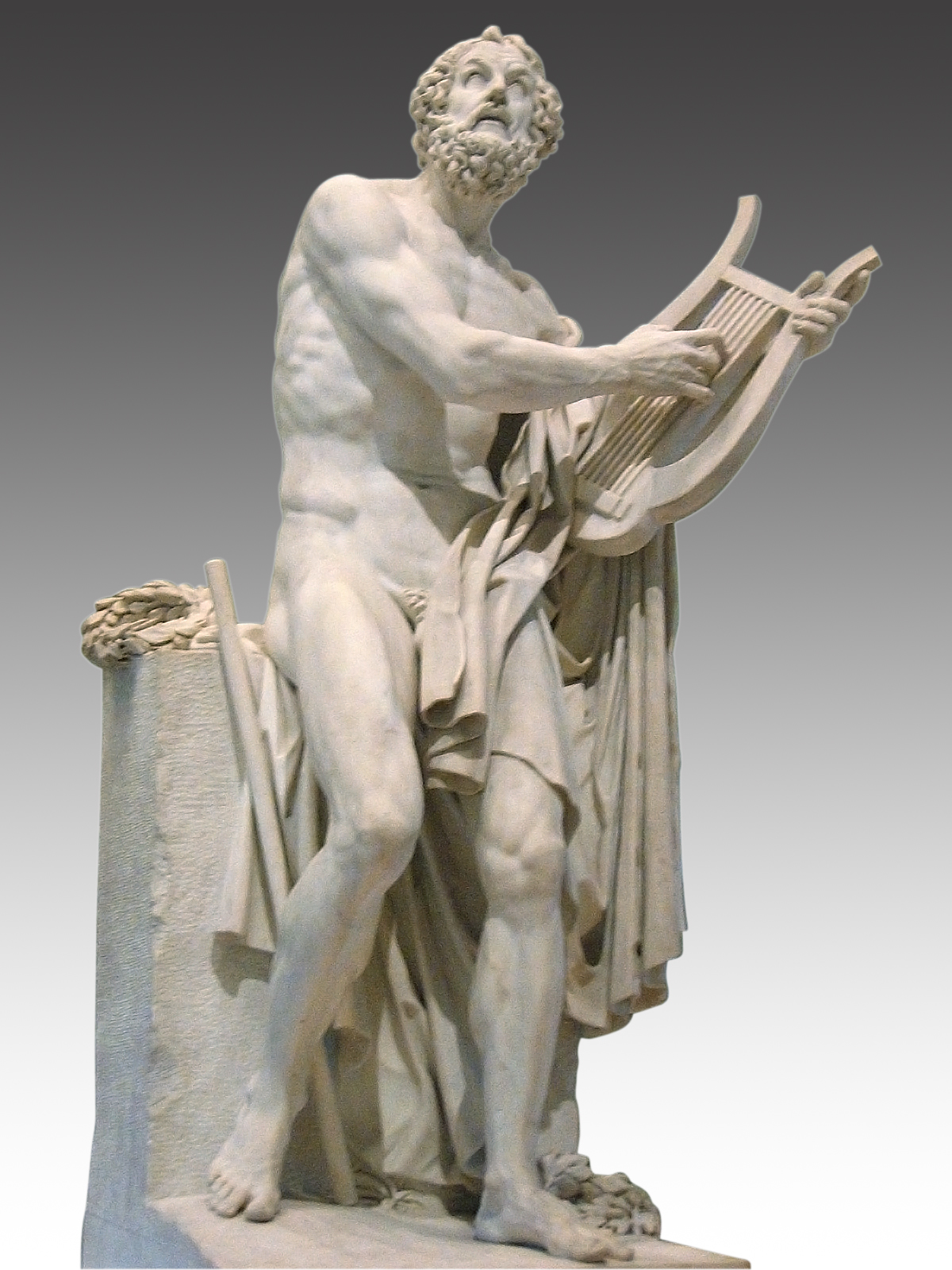
Homer, 1812, by Philippe-Laurent Roland

The Life of Homer, whose unknown author is referred to as Pseudo-Herodotus, is one among several ancient biographies of the Greek epic poet Homer. It is distinguished from the others by the fact that it contains, in its first lines, the claim to have been compiled by the early historian Herodotus:

Herodotus of Halicarnassus wrote the following history of Homer's background, upbringing and life, and sought to make his account complete and absolutely reliable.

Despite being written in the Ionic dialect, it is not generally, and has not been since a time before the publication of books, considered to be the work of Herodotus and therefore according to current scholarly conventions the author merits the name "Pseudo-Herodotus." Although used in this context as a proper name, it is also used as a common name, "the pseudo-Herodotus," whenever a writer questions the authorship of any or any part of the writings of Herodotus.

The text concludes with a calculation showing that Homer was born 168 years after the Trojan War and 622 years before Xerxes I of Persia (a major figure in the real Herodotus's Histories) invaded Greece. That invasion took place in 480 BC; by this calculation, therefore, Homer was born in 1102 BC. This contradicts the estimate given by the real Herodotus, that Homer lived "not more than 400 years before our own time", thus around 850 BC.

== Epistemological interpretations ==
The invalidation of the author's stated identity threatens to disqualify the work's entire project, including all of the biographical claims made by the author about Homer. What, if anything, within the work can be retained in light of the author's apparent illegitimacy is a question that has been debated throughout classical scholarship.

The most skeptical interpretation is that the text is patently false. It was, on this view, written long after Herodotus' time, perhaps in the 3rd or 4th centuries AD, when there was an audience for literary pastiches, such as the Letters of Alciphron, and fraudulent attributions, as in the Historia Augusta. Thus the Life of Homer would be best treated as historical fiction.

Pseudo-Herodotus's portrait of Homer draws on works including the Odyssey. Where the Odyssey features Phemius the bard, Mentes the mariner, Mentor of Ithaca, and Tychius, a leather-worker, the Life mentions Phemius, a school-master, Mentes, a ship-captain, Mentor, a man of Ithaca, and Tychius, a leather-maker. Some of the epigrams are found in other Lives. The character of the wandering blind bard, Demodocus, in the Odyssey, fits the characterization of Homer in the Life.

The appearance of these elements can be explained by back-formation; that is, the author manufactured stories to explain elements already known to his readers. This shows that the Life is drawn from traditional sources, not wholly fabricated. Scholars have therefore accepted elements from the Life, knowing that they may be fabrications, since at least the time of Guillaume Bude, who "accepted Pseudo-Herodotus' method and results".

The main problem with the Life is identifying elements to which limited credibility might be extended, how limited, and why. For example, one reason for some credibility is that all the Lives were "compiled from the Alexandrian period onward but sometimes incorporating stories from the classical age".

== Content ==
Ingeniously linking the famous poet with various places that figure prominently in his works and in well-known legends about him, the Life depicts Homer as the illegitimate son of Cretheis of Argos and his ward, who was the daughter of Melanopus of Cyme in Aeolis (Asia Minor). Homer, whose name at birth was Melesigenes ("Meles-born"), was born at neighbouring Smyrna. He went with his schoolteacher on a voyage to Ithaca, where he stayed with a certain Mentor; later he would include Mentor as a character in the Odyssey as acknowledgment to his host. Already a sufferer from eye disease, Homer became blind during the return journey from Ithaca, at Colophon. He then took up poetry in order to make a living.

Having failed in a bid for municipal sponsorship at Cyme, he moved to Phocaea, where another schoolteacher, Thestorides, offered him food and lodging in exchange for the right to record his poetry in writing. Homer had little choice but to accept, and recited to Thestorides the Iliad and the Odyssey.

Thestorides afterwards moved to Chios, where he performed Homer's poems as if they were his own and became famous. Homer heard rumours of this and eventually travelled to Chios also, where he found work as a tutor. Thestorides retreated hastily, and it was in Chios that Homer composed those of his supposed works that were meant for children, including the Batrachomyomachia or "Battle of the Frogs and Mice". At the end of his life Homer travelled to Samos; he died at Ios in the course of a voyage to Athens.

== Notable features ==
The Pseudo-Herodotean Life of Homer is unique among ancient versions of the poet's life in claiming that writing was known in Homer's circle and that the poems were written down from his recital.

The work also preserves 17 epigrams attributed to Homer. Three of these epigrams (epigrams III, XIII and XVII) are also preserved in the Contest of Homer and Hesiod and epigram I is found in a few manuscripts of the Homeric Hymns.

== See also ==
- The Kiln, one of the poems recited by Homer in the Life
