= Batrachomyomachia =

Ancient Greek comedy epic

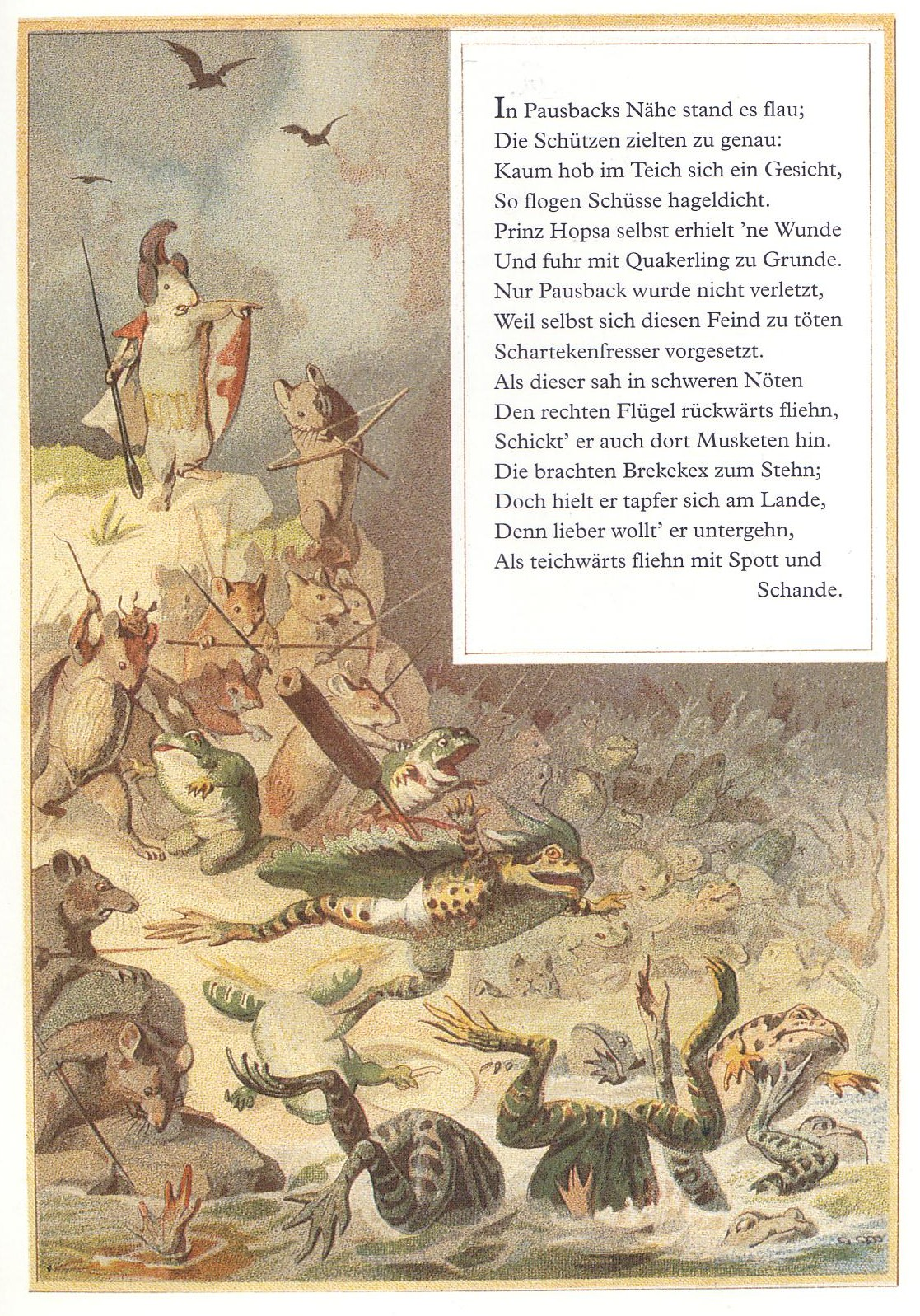
Illustration by Fedor Flinzer from a modern reprint based on an 1878 German edition of the Batrachomyomachia

The Batrachomyomachia (Ancient Greek: Βατραχομυομαχία, from βάτραχος, "frog", μῦς, "mouse", and μάχη, "battle") or Battle of the Frogs and Mice is a comic epic, or a parody of the Iliad. Although its date and authorship are uncertain, it belongs to the classical period, as it was known to Plutarch. Its composition date was traditionally placed in the 5th century BC, but linguistic studies suggested the poem's origin in Ionia during the 3rd or 2nd century BC. A minority view considers it to be a Roman era-poem and attributes it to Lucian (2nd century AD).

A manuscript from the High Middle Ages attributes the poem to Timarchus of Caria, who is otherwise unknown. He has been identified with either the tyrant Timarchus of Miletus (killed in 258 BC while serving in the Syrian Wars) or the usurper king Timarchus (killed in 160 BC while serving in the early phases of the Seleucid Dynastic Wars). Both men were thought to have originated in Miletus.

The word batrachomyomachia has come to mean "a trivial altercation". Both the Greek word and its German translation, Froschmäusekrieg, have been used to describe disputes such as the one between the ideologues and pragmatists in the Reagan administration.

== Plot ==
Psicharpax, the Mouse-Prince, having escaped a hunting cat (or a stoat), stops by the shore of a lake to drink, and encounters the Frog King Physignathus. Physignathus offers to show Psicharpax his kingdom, on the other side of the lake, and the Mouse agrees. Psicharpax climbs onto the Frog King's back, and Physignathus begins to swim across the lake. In the middle of the lake, they are confronted by a frightening water snake. Physignathus dives for safety, forgetting about Psicharpax – who cannot swim, and drowns.

On the bank, another Mouse witnesses Psicharpax's death, and informs the other Mice, who arm themselves for battle to avenge what they perceive as the Frog King's treachery, and send a herald to the Frogs with a declaration of war. The Frogs blame their King, who altogether denies the incident. In the meantime, Zeus, seeing a war brewing, proposes that the gods take sides, and specifically that Athena help the Mice. Athena refuses, saying that the Mice have done her a lot of mischief, as have the Frogs, and that it would be more prudent for the gods to watch rather than get involved. The animals' battle goes ahead, and the Mice prevail. Pitying the frenzied slaughter of the Frogs by the Mice, Zeus prepares his thunderbolt and launches it, creating terror among those involved in the battle. But the Mice do not stop fighting. Finally, Zeus summons a force of crabs to prevent the complete destruction of the Frogs. Powerless against the armoured crabs, the Mice give up fighting and retreat, and the one-day war ends at sundown.

== Characters ==
Besides the familiar Greek gods, the Batrachomyomachia introduces a number of novel characters representing the leaders and warriors of the two armies, whose combat is described in stark and violent terms, resembling the battle scenes of the Iliad, but with arms consisting of sticks and needles, and armor made from nut shells, bean pods, straw, leaves, vegetables, and the skin of an excoriated cat. Much of the humour of the Batrachomyomachia is derived from this contrast, as well as the names of the warriors. The translations of these names are based on William Cowper's version.

=== Mice ===
- Artepibulus, "he who lies in wait for bread" (more literally, "Bread-Plotter"): father of Mouse-Prince Meridarpax.
- Artophagus, "Bread-Eater": slays Polyphonus with his spear.
- Cnissodioctes, "Savory-Steam–Hunter": dragged into the lake and drowned by Prassophagus.
- Embasichytrus, "explorer of pots and pipkins" (lit. "Pot-Enterer"): herald of the Mice; declares war upon the Frogs; later slays Seutlaeus (or is slain by him—there is manuscript support for each reading, though the former is generally preferred in modern translations).
- Lichenor, "Licker": (1) A mouse speared by Hypsiboas, thereby becoming the first casualty of the battle. (2) The mouse who avenges the death of Troglodytes by killing Limnocharis with his lance; he thence chases Crambophagus into the lake, and kills him as well.
- Lichomyle, "licker of mill-stones" (lit. "Lick-Millstone"): mother of Mouse-Prince Psicharpax.
- Lichopinax, "Dish-Licker": witnesses Psicharpax's drowning, and informs the Mice; slays Borborocoites during the battle.
- Meridarpax, "Scrap-Catcher": mouse-prince and a matchless warrior; swears to destroy the Frogs, but is prevented by the intervention of the gods.
- Psicharpax, "Crumb-Catcher": (1) The mouse-prince whose drowning at the hands of Physignathus precipitates the war. (2) A warrior who, while defending the bodies of the fallen Mice, slays Pelusius with his spear; splashed with mud by the Frog chieftain, Pelobates, he breaks his foe's leg with a stone, but is disemboweled by Craugasides before he (Psicharpax) can kill the chieftain.
- Pternoglyphus, "Ham-Carver": terrifies Calaminthius, who—casting aside his shield—flees into the lake.
- Pternophagus, "Bacon-Eater": the mouse-king; crushed by Hydrocharis with a stone.
- Pternotroctes, "Bacon-Gnawer": maternal grandfather of Mouse-Prince Psicharpax.
- Sitophagus, "Cake-Eater": a mouse who, crippled by his wounds, limps away from the battle and takes refuge in a ditch.
- Troglodytes, "creeper into holes and crannies" (more lit., "Mousehole-Creeper"): slays Pelion, and is killed by a heavy stone hurled by Limnocharis.
- Troxartes, "Bread-Gnawer": father of Mouse-Prince Psicharpax; wounds Physignathus in the foot, causing the frog-king to jump to safety in the lake; he is then attacked by Prassaeus, but the frog cannot pierce his (Troxartes') shield.
- Tyroglyphus, "Cheese-Carver": father of Embasichytrus; slain on the lake-shore by Limnisius.

=== Frogs ===
- Borborocoites, "sleeper in the mud", speared by Lichopinax.
- Calaminthius, "calamint", flees into the lake at the approach of Pternoglyphus, leaving his shield behind.
- Crambophagus, "the cabbage-eater", flees into the lake at the sight of Limnocharis' death at the hands of Lichenor, who gives chase and slays the Frog.
- Craugasides, "the hoarse-croaker", saves his chieftain, Pelobates, from the Mouse-warrior Psicharpax, whom he disembowels with his lance.
- Hydrocharis, "he who delights in the water", crushes the Mouse-king Pternophagus with a stone.
- Hydromedusa, "governess of the waters", the mother of Physignathus.
- Hypsiboas, "the loud-croaker", slays the Mouse Lichenor with his spear at the beginning of the battle.
- Limnisius, "of the lake", slays Tyroglyphus on the lake-shore.
- Limnocharis, "the beauty of the lake", (1) an epithet of Physignathus, the Frog-king; (2) a warrior who slays Troglodytes with a heavy stone, and is in turn killed by the lance of Lichenor.
- Peleus, "of or belonging to mud", the father of Physignathus (in the Iliad, this is also the name of Achilles' father).
- Pelion, "offspring of the mud", speared by Troglodytes, becomes the first casualty among the Frogs.
- Pelobates, "the mud-walker", one of the Frog chieftains, splashes the Mouse-warrior Psicharpax with mud, only to have his leg broken by a stone hurled by Psicharpax. Craugasides saves him by killing Psicharpax.
- Pelusius, "the muddy", slain by the spear of the Mouse warrior Psicharpax.
- Polyphonus, "the noisy", slain by the spear of Artophagus.
- Physignathus, "the pouter", the Frog-king, begins the war by accidentally drowning the Mouse-prince Psicharpax. Wounded by Troxartes, the father of Psicharpax, he leaps to safety in the lake.
- Prassaeus, "the garlic-dealer", assails Troxartes after the Mouse-prince wounds Physignathus, causing the Frog-king to retreat, but he cannot pierce Troxartes' shield.
- Prassophagus, "the garlic-eater", drags Cnissodioctes into the lake and drowns him.
- Seutlaeus, "the beet-eater", slain by (or slays, the passage is unclear) Embasichytrus.

== Authorship ==
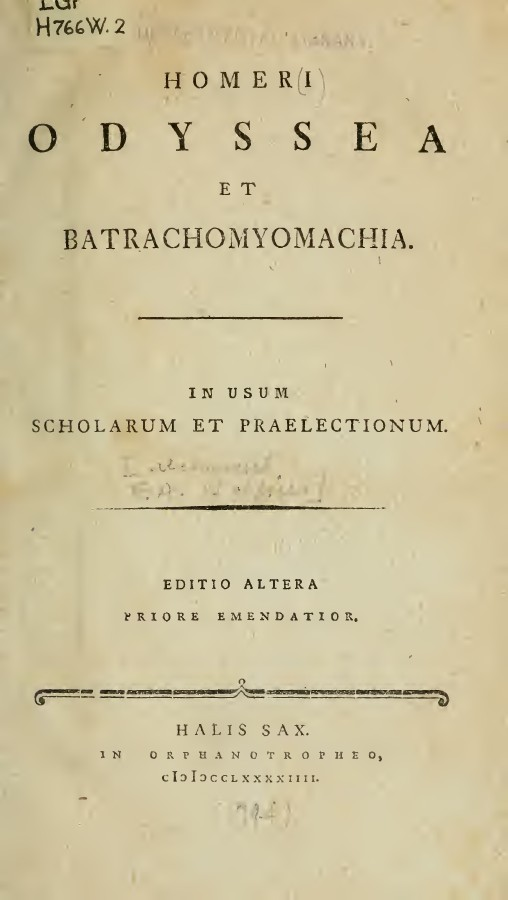
1794 Latin edition of the Odyssey and Batrachomyomachia.

The Romans attributed the Batrachomyomachia to Homer, but according to Plutarch, it is the work of Pigres of Halicarnassus, either the brother or son of Artemisia I, the Queen of Caria, and an ally of Xerxes. In the nineteenth century, the poem was widely considered to be of the fifth century BC or somewhat earlier, but linguistic studies starting in the late 19th century suggest that the poem was written in the late Hellenistic period, or even under the early Roman Empire. Lucian has been suggested as a possible author, although this attribution would place the poem after Plutarch's death.

A manuscript of the poem, dating to the eleventh or twelfth century, contains a note attributing the poem to a Tigres or Timarchus of Caria: this could refer to Timarchus the tyrant of Miletus or the Seleucid usurper. Matthew Hosty describes this attribution as "a possibility at best" but suggests that an origin for the poem in third- or second-century BC Ionia is plausible.

== Galeomyomachia and Catomyomachia ==
While the Batrachomyomachia is the most complete example of an animal-based comic epic, it is not the only one. A second example, the Galeomyomachia, meaning "War of the Weasel and the Mice", was a poem belonging to the same classical period, also of uncertain date and authorship, but only survives in fragments. The Galeomyomachia is similar in style to the Batrachomyomachia.

A second example of an animal-based parody is the Catomyomachia, meaning "War of the Cat and the Mice" written by the Byzantine Greek monk and author Theodore Prodromos (c. 1100 – c. 1165/70). Unlike the previous two works, the Catomyomachia takes the form of a parody drama of the classical Greek tragedies, with dramatic roles for the mice. The action takes place off stage, and is related in two speeches by the messenger. The cat is ultimately the victor in the war, but a deus ex machina saves the mice from the housecat in the end.

== See also ==
- Battle of the Frogs

== English translations ==
- Chapman, George (trans.) Homer's Batrachomyomachia, Hymns and Epigrams. Adamant Media Corporation, 2001. ISBN 1-4021-8183-3
- Hine, Daryl (trans.) The Battle of the Frogs and the Mice, Works of Hesiod and the Homeric Hymns. University of Chicago Press, 2008. ISBN 0226329674
- Stallings, A. E. (trans.) The Battle Between the Frogs and the Mice: a tiny homeric epic. Philadelphia: Paul Dry Books, 2019. ISBN 9781589881426
- Hosty, M. (trans.) Batrachomyomachia (Battle of the Frogs and Mice): Introduction, Text, Translation, and Commentary. Oxford: Oxford University Press, 2020. ISBN 9780198849902
