= Homer =

Ancient Greek poet

- Ὅμηρος; Hómēros
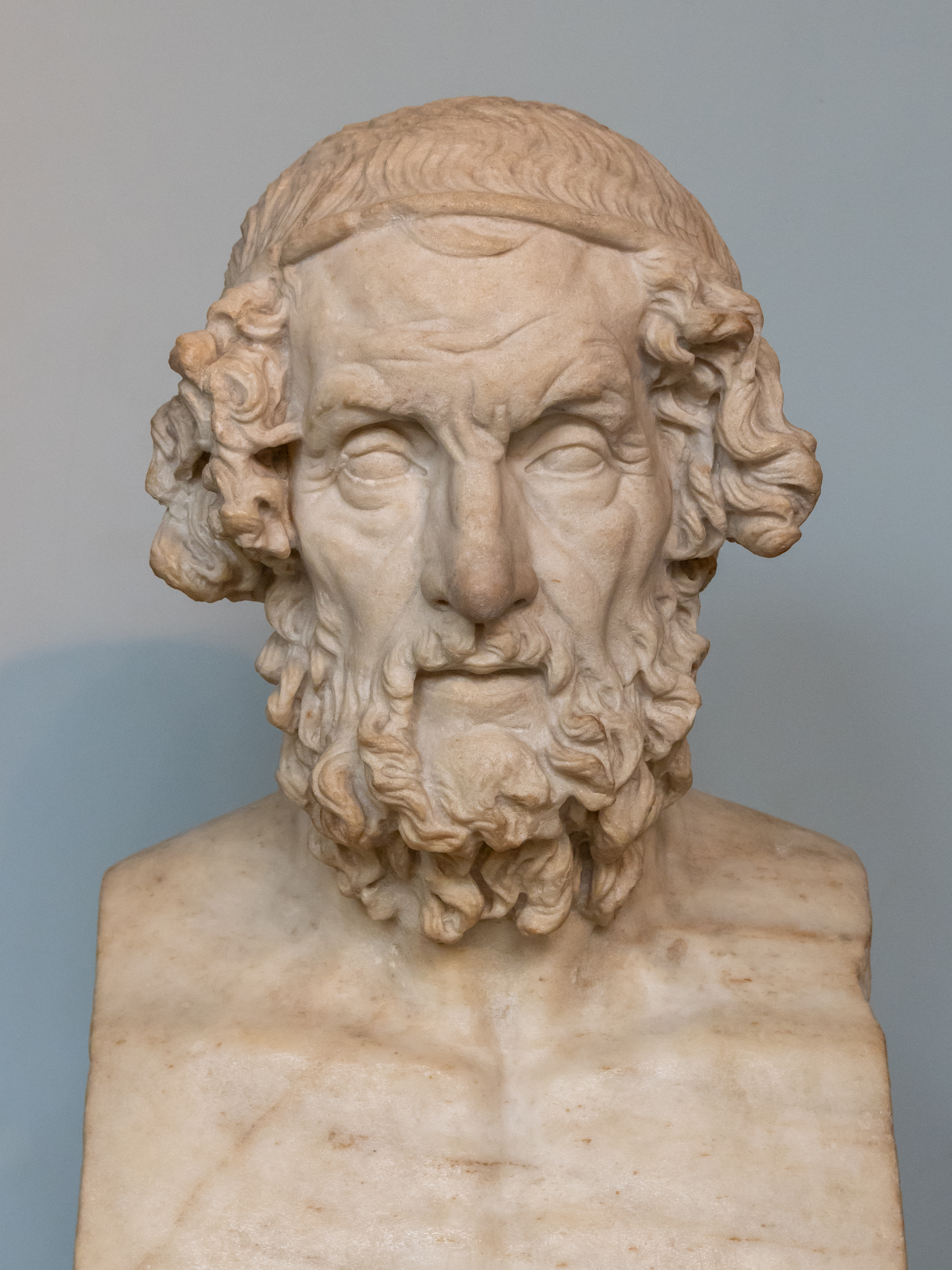
- Marble terminal bust of Homer. Roman copy of a lost 2nd-century BC Hellenistic original
- Born: c. 8th century BC possibly Ionia
- Died: Ios
- Writing career
- Language: Homeric Greek (literary); Ionic Greek
- Genre: Epic
- Subject: Epic Cycle
- Notable works: Iliad; Odyssey

Homer (/ˈhoʊ.mər/; Ancient Greek: Ὅμηρος [hómɛːros], Hómēros; possibly born c. 8th century BC) was an ancient Greek poet who is traditionally credited as the author of the Iliad and the Odyssey, two epic poems that are foundational works of ancient Greek literature. Homer was highly revered in ancient Greek society and is considered one of the most influential authors in history. The question of Homer's identity and existence—dubbed the "Homeric Question"—continues to be debated, and scholars generally regard the two poems as the works of separate authors.

The Iliad centers on a quarrel between King Agamemnon and the warrior Achilles during the last year of the Trojan War. The Odyssey chronicles the ten-year journey of Odysseus, king of Ithaca, back to his home after the fall of Troy. The epics depict man's struggle, the Odyssey especially so, as Odysseus perseveres through the punishment of the gods. The poems are in Homeric Greek, also known as Epic Greek, a literary language that shows a mixture of features of the Ionic and Aeolic dialects from different centuries; the predominant influence is Eastern Ionic. Most researchers believe that the poems were originally transmitted orally. Despite being predominantly known for their tragic and serious themes, the Homeric poems also contain instances of comedy and laughter.

The Homeric poems shaped aspects of ancient Greek culture and education, fostering ideals of heroism, glory, and honor. To Plato, Homer was in simple words the one who "has educated Greece" (τὴν Ἑλλάδα πεπαίδευκεν, tēn Helláda pepaídeuken). In Dante's Divine Comedy, Virgil refers to Homer as "Poet sovereign", king of all poets; in the preface to his translation of the Iliad, Alexander Pope acknowledges that Homer has always been considered the "greatest of poets". From antiquity to the present, Homeric epics have inspired many famous works of literature, music, art, and film.

The questions of by whom, when, where, and under what circumstances the Iliad and Odyssey were composed are the subject of continued scholarship. It is thought that the poems were composed at some point around the late eighth or early seventh century BC. Many accounts of Homer's life circulated in classical antiquity, the most widespread that he was a blind bard from Ionia, a region including the central part of the western coast of Anatolia in present-day Turkey, and the Greek islands of Chios and Samos. Modern scholars consider these accounts to be historically apocryphal or "legendary".

== Biography, identity, and biographical traditions ==
The identity of "Homer" is a mystery, and scholars generally regard the ancient conception of a single author behind the Iliad and the Odyssey as a fictional narrative. During antiquity, biographical details about Homer's life became increasingly mythologized due to his anonymity, and it was believed during that period that he lived after the Trojan War. Contemporary scholars study the life of Homer alongside the Homeric Question, the ongoing academic debate concerning Homer's authorship and the origins, composition, and transmission of the epic poems attributed to him. The two best-known ancient biographies of Homer are the Life of Homer by the Pseudo-Herodotus and the Contest of Homer and Hesiod.

The first early implicit references to Homer in the 7th century BC are in works by Archilochus, Alcman, Tyrtaeus, and Callinus. In most ancient biographies, Homer is depicted as being blind; other biographies, such as that in the Byzantine encyclopedia Suda, described Homer to be descended from one of the Muses, Apollo, Orpheus, Thamyris, Telemachus, or Musaeus. Another tradition from the time of the Roman emperor Hadrian says Epicaste (daughter of Nestor) and Telemachus (son of Odysseus) were the parents of Homer. The poet Pindar is credited with saying that Homer originated from Chios and Smyrna, both of which are also mentioned by other fifth-century writers. Other biographical traditions imagined Homer to have been a rhapsode or singer who performed at religious festivals, was a wandering bard or a composer of other works (the "Homerica"), or that he failed to solve a riddle set by fishermen. According to the Greek historian Ephorus, Homer studied poetry with the bard Phemius and was born in Cyme. Philochorus thought Homer's birthplace to be in Argos; later writers believed Pylos and Athens to have been Homer's birthplace. No one account of Homer's origin became mainstream, but most accounts of his death place its location on Ios.

The two epigrams in the Greek Anthology by Alcaeus of Messene commemorate Homer's death and burial on the island of Ios, emphasizing both the poet's immortal fame and the honor bestowed upon the small island that serves as his tomb.

== Works attributed to Homer ==
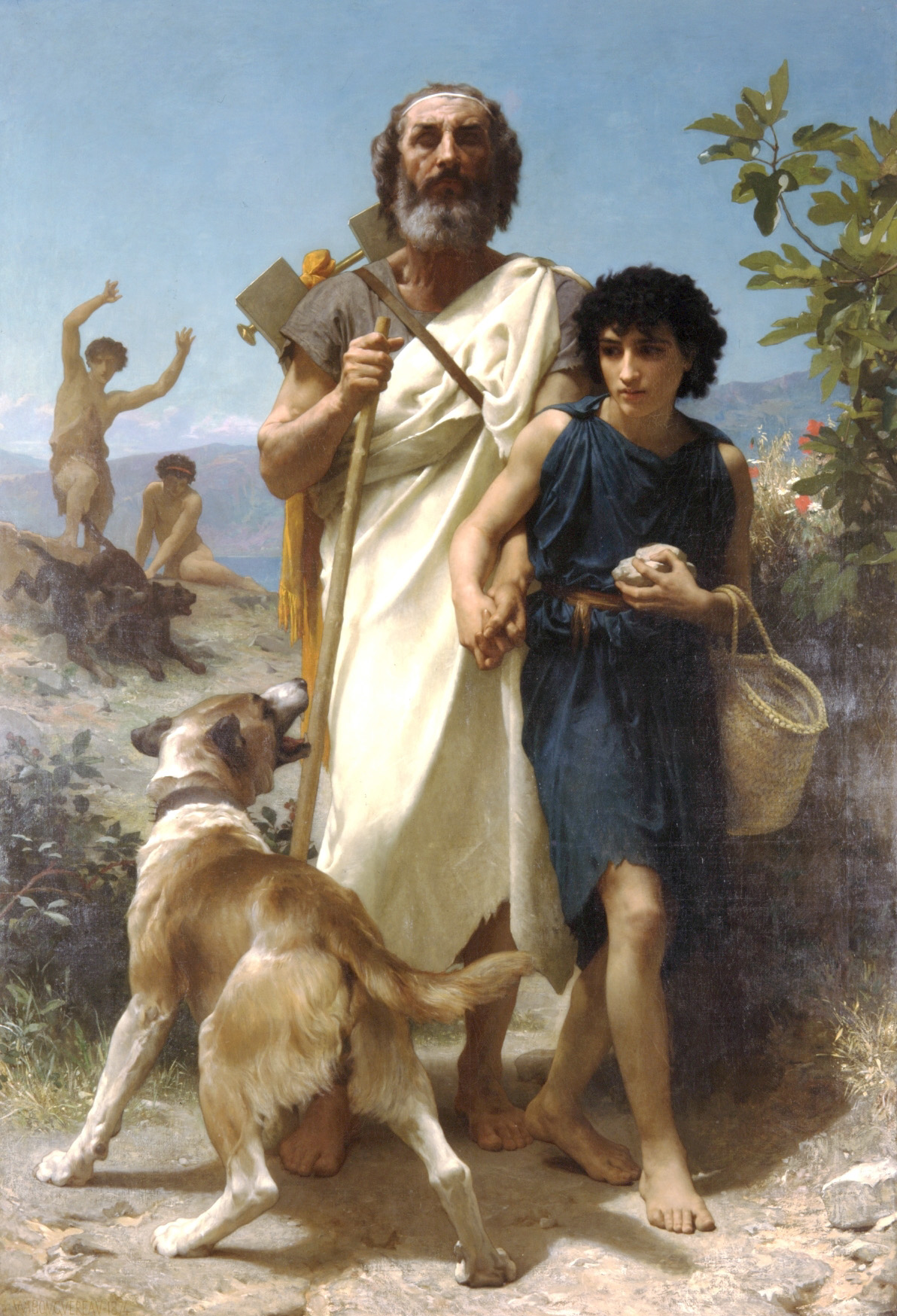
Homer and His Guide (1874) by William-Adolphe Bouguereau

Today, only the Iliad and the Odyssey are associated with the name "Homer". In antiquity, a large number of other works were sometimes attributed to him, including the Homeric Hymns, the Contest of Homer and Hesiod, several epigrams, the Little Iliad, the Nostoi, the Thebaid, the Cypria, the Epigoni, the comic mini-epic Batrachomyomachia ("The Frog–Mouse War"), the Margites, the Capture of Oechalia, and the Phocais. These claims are not considered authentic today and were not universally accepted in the ancient world. As with the multitude of legends surrounding Homer's life, they indicate little more than the centrality of Homer to ancient Greek culture.

== History of Homeric scholarship ==
=== Ancient ===
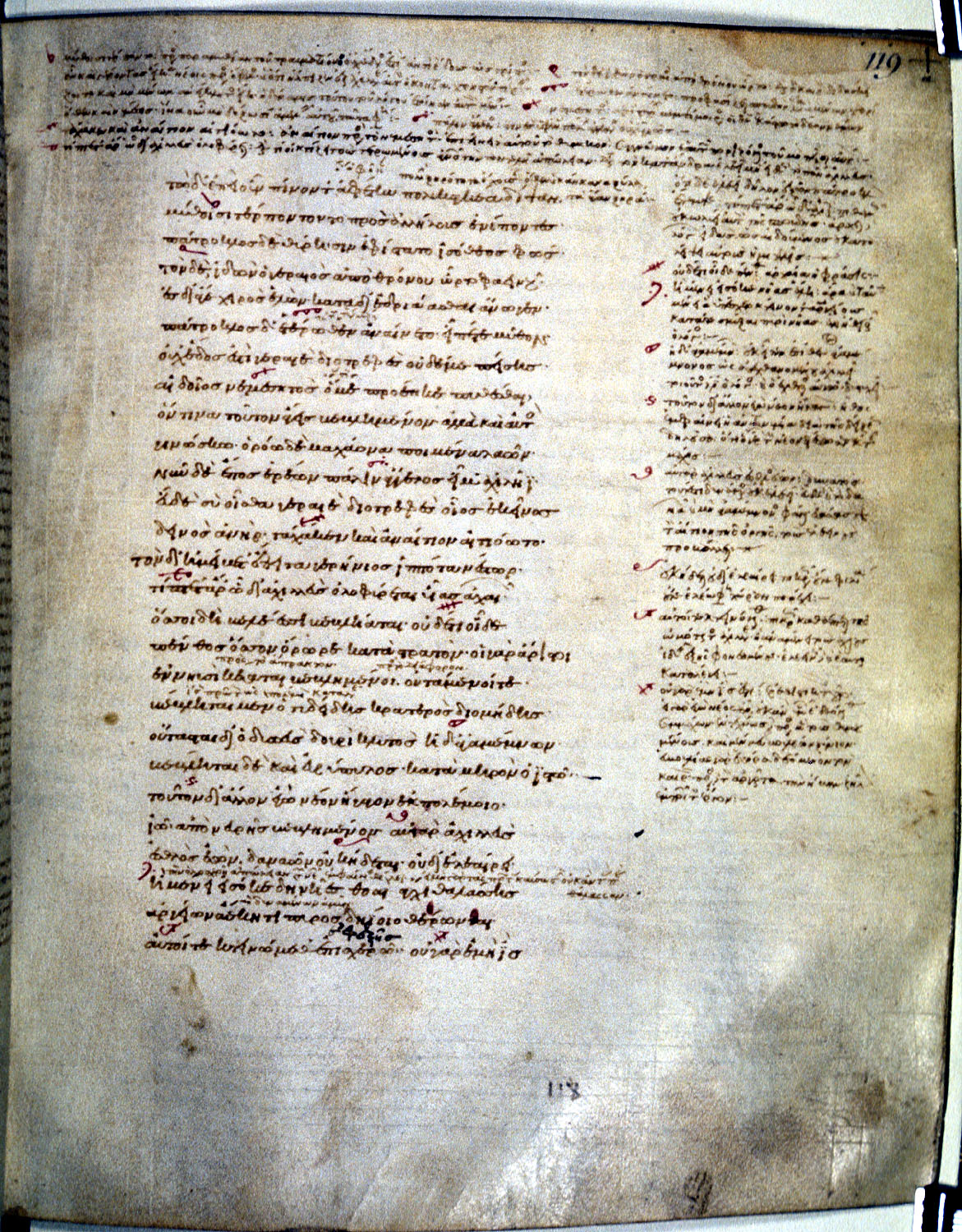
Part of an eleventh-century manuscript, "the Townley Homer". The writings on the top and right side are scholia.

The study of Homer is one of the oldest topics in scholarship, dating back to antiquity. Nonetheless, the aims of Homeric studies have changed throughout the millennia. The earliest preserved comments on Homer concern his treatment of the gods, which hostile critics such as the poet Xenophanes of Colophon denounced as immoral. The allegorist Theagenes of Rhegium is said to have defended Homer by arguing that the Homeric poems are allegories. The Iliad and the Odyssey were widely used as school texts in ancient Greek and Hellenistic cultures. They were the first literary works taught to all students. The Iliad, particularly its first few books, was far more intently studied than the Odyssey during the Hellenistic and Roman periods.

As a result of the poems' prominence in classical Greek education, extensive commentaries on them developed to explain parts that were culturally or linguistically difficult. During the Hellenistic and Roman periods, many interpreters, especially the Stoics, who believed that Homeric poems conveyed Stoic doctrines, regarded them as allegories, containing hidden wisdom. Perhaps partially because of the Homeric poems' extensive use in education, many authors believed that Homer's original purpose had been to educate. Homer's wisdom became so widely praised that he began to acquire the image of almost a prototypical philosopher. Byzantine scholars such as Eustathius of Thessalonica and John Tzetzes produced commentaries, extensions and scholia to Homer, especially in the twelfth century. Eustathius's commentary on the Iliad alone is massive, sprawling over nearly 4,000 oversized pages in a 21st-century printed version and his commentary on the Odyssey an additional nearly 2,000.

=== Modern ===
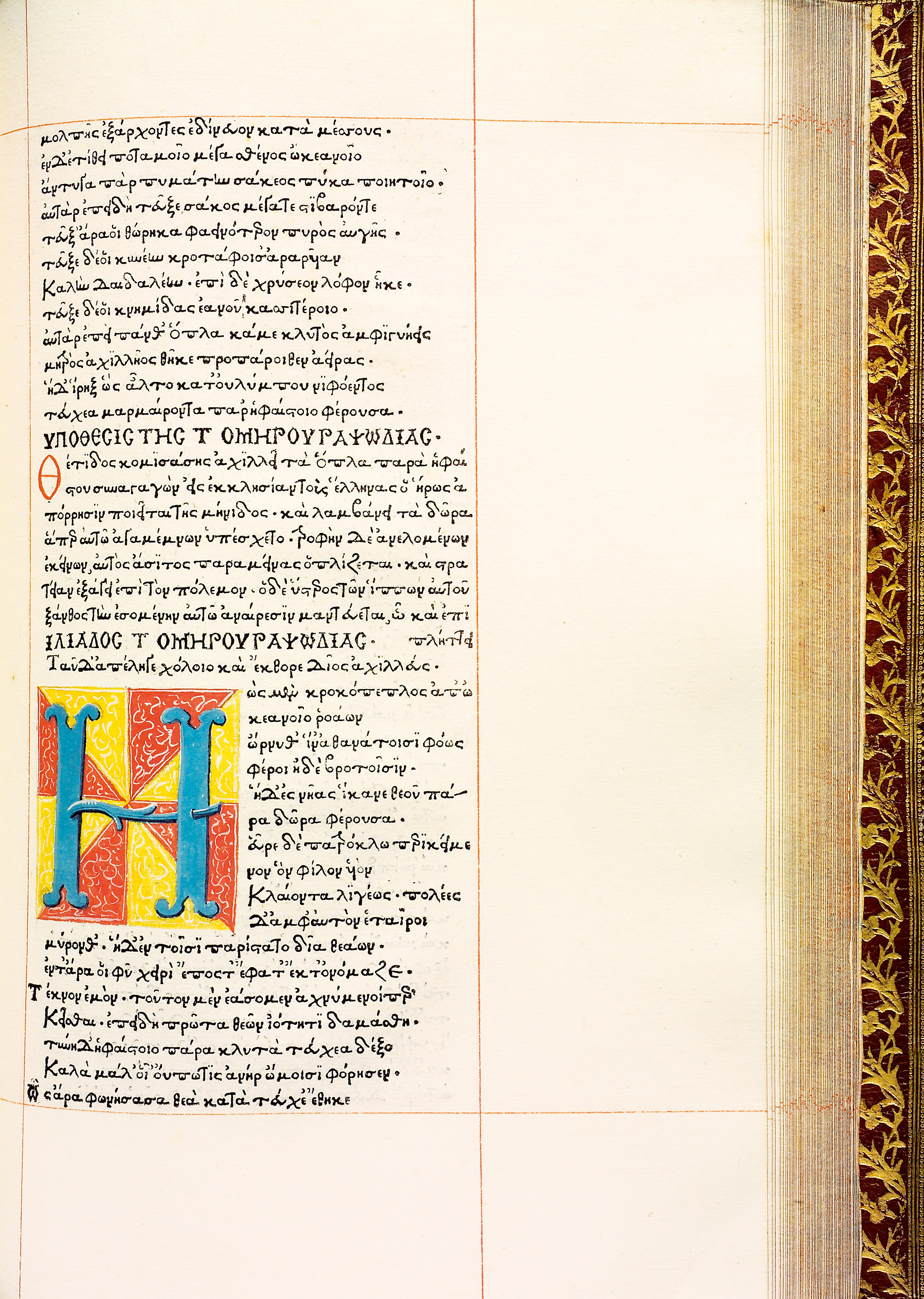
Page from the first printed edition (editio princeps) of collected works by Homer edited by Demetrios Chalkokondyles, Florence, 1489, Bibliothèque Nationale de France

In 1488, the Greek scholar Demetrios Chalkokondyles published in Florence the editio princeps of the Homeric poems. The earliest modern Homeric scholars started with the same basic approaches towards the Homeric poems as scholars in antiquity. The allegorical interpretation of the Homeric poems that had been so prevalent in antiquity returned to become the prevailing view of the Renaissance. Renaissance humanists praised Homer as the archetypically wise poet, whose writings contain hidden wisdom, disguised through allegory. In Western Europe during the Renaissance, Virgil was more widely read than Homer and Homer was often seen through a Virgilian lens.

In 1664, contradicting the widespread praise of Homer as the epitome of wisdom, François Hédelin, abbé d'Aubignac wrote a scathing attack on the Homeric poems, declaring that they were incoherent, immoral, tasteless, and without style, that Homer never existed, and that the poems were hastily cobbled together by incompetent editors from unrelated oral songs. Fifty years later, the English scholar Richard Bentley concluded that Homer did exist but that he was an obscure, prehistoric oral poet whose compositions bear little relation to the Iliad and the Odyssey as they have been passed down. According to Bentley, Homer "wrote a Sequel of Songs and Rhapsodies, to be sung by himself for small Earnings and good Cheer at Festivals and other Days of Merriment; the Ilias he wrote for men, and the Odysseis for the other Sex. These loose songs were not collected together in the form of an epic Poem till Pisistratus' time, about 500 Years after".

Giambattista Vico analysed Homer and other ancient writings in his philological treatise The New Science (1744) and concluded that Homer was not one man, but many, or an amalgam of other writers. Vico writes "he was a purely ideal poet who never existed as a particular man" and that "Homer was an idea or a heroic character of Grecian men insofar as they told their histories in song".

Friedrich August Wolf's Prolegomena ad Homerum, published in 1795, argued that much of the material later incorporated into the Iliad and the Odyssey was originally composed in the tenth century BC in the form of short, separate oral songs, which passed through oral tradition for roughly four hundred years before being assembled into prototypical versions of the Iliad and the Odyssey in the sixth century BC by literate authors. After being written down, Wolf maintained that the two poems were extensively edited, modernized, and eventually shaped into their present state as artistic unities. Wolf and the "Analyst" school, which led the field in the nineteenth century, sought to recover the original, authentic poems that were thought to be concealed by later excrescences.

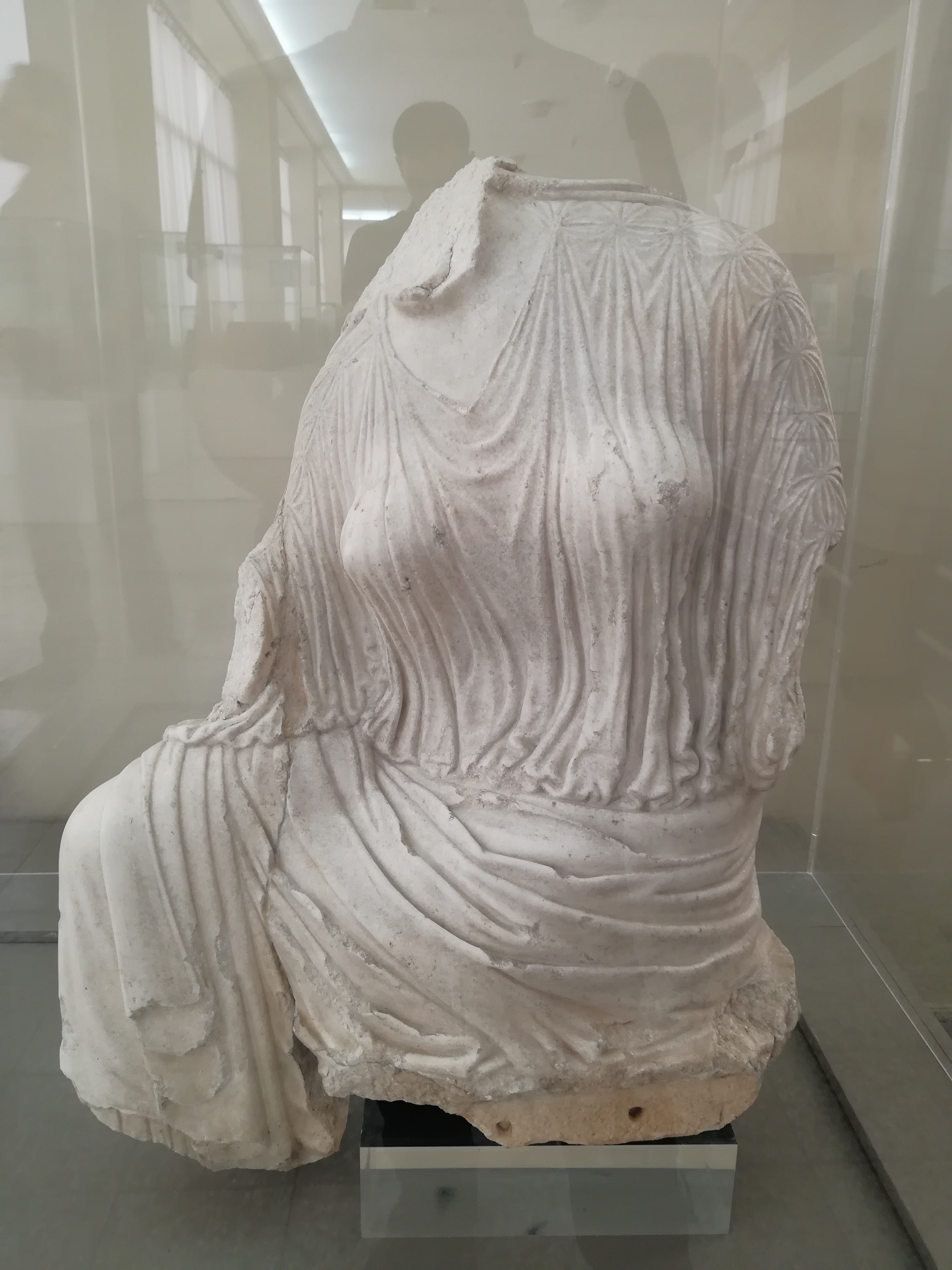
Among the four surviving statues of Penelope, this is the oldest dating back to the 5th century BC, crafted 300 years after Homer composed the Odyssey. Discovered in Persepolis and housed at the National Museum of Iran, the other three are kept at the Vatican Museum and Capitoline Museum in Rome.

Within the Analyst school were two camps: proponents of the "lay theory", which held that the Iliad and the Odyssey were put together from a large number of short, independent songs, and proponents of the "nucleus theory", which held that Homer had originally composed shorter versions of the Iliad and the Odyssey, which later poets expanded and revised. A small group of scholars opposed to the Analysts, dubbed "Unitarians", saw the later additions as superior, the work of a single inspired poet. By around 1830, the central preoccupations of Homeric scholars, dealing with whether or not "Homer" actually existed, when and how the Homeric poems originated, how they were transmitted, when and how they were finally written down, and their overall unity, had been dubbed "the Homeric Question".

Following World War I, the Analyst school began to fall out of favor among Homeric scholars. It did not die out entirely, but it came to be increasingly seen as a discredited dead end. Starting in around 1928, Milman Parry and Albert Lord, after they studied folk bards in the Balkans, developed the "Oral-Formulaic Theory" that the Homeric poems were originally composed through improvised oral performances, which relied on traditional epithets and poetic formulas. This theory found very wide scholarly acceptance and explained many previously puzzling features of the Homeric poems, including their unusually archaic language, their extensive use of stock epithets, and their other "repetitive" features. Many scholars concluded that the "Homeric Question" had finally been answered.

Meanwhile, the "Neoanalysts" sought to bridge the gap between the "Analysts" and "Unitarians". The Neoanalysts sought to trace the relationships between the Homeric poems and other epic poems, which have now been lost, but of which modern scholars do possess some patchy knowledge. Neoanalysts hold that knowledge of earlier versions of the epics can be derived from anomalies of structure and detail in the surviving versions of the Iliad and Odyssey. These anomalies point to earlier versions of the Iliad in which Ajax played a more prominent role, in which the Achaean embassy to Achilles comprised different characters, and in which Patroclus was mistaken for Achilles by the Trojans. They point to earlier versions of the Odyssey in which Telemachus went in search of news of his father not to Menelaus in Sparta but to Idomeneus in Crete, in which Telemachus met up with his father in Crete and conspired with him to return to Ithaca disguised as the soothsayer Theoclymenus, and in which Penelope recognized Odysseus much earlier in the narrative and conspired with him in the destruction of the suitors. Neoanalysts have traditionally reconstructed specific lost poems as sources for the Iliad and Odyssey, but more recent scholarship has sought to reframe such neoanalytical arguments within the oral context of early Greek epic, exploring how the Iliad and Odyssey draw on established mythological traditions in general (such as the story of Achilles' death).

=== Contemporary ===
Although most contemporary scholars disagree on other questions about the genesis of the poems, they agree that the Iliad and the Odyssey were not produced by the same author, based on "the many differences of narrative manner, theology, ethics, vocabulary, and geographical perspective, and by the imitative character of certain passages of the Odyssey about the Iliad". Nearly all scholars agree that the Iliad and the Odyssey are unified poems, in that each poem shows a clear overall design and that they are not merely strung together from unrelated songs. It is also generally agreed that each poem was composed mostly by a single author, who probably relied heavily on older oral traditions. Nearly all scholars agree that the Doloneia in Book X of the Iliad is not part of the original poem, but rather a later insertion by a different poet.

Some ancient scholars believed Homer to have been an eyewitness to the Trojan War; others thought he had lived up to 500 years afterwards. Contemporary scholars continue to debate the date of the poems. A long history of oral transmission lies behind the composition of the poems, complicating the search for a precise date. At one extreme, Richard Janko has proposed a date for both poems to the eighth century BC based on linguistic analysis and statistics. Barry B. Powell dates the composition of the Iliad and the Odyssey to sometime between 800 and 750 BC, based on the statement from Herodotus, who lived in the late fifth century BC, that Homer lived four hundred years before his own time "and not more" (καὶ οὐ πλέοσι) and on the fact that the poems do not mention hoplite battle tactics, inhumation, or literacy.

Martin Litchfield West has argued that the Iliad echoes the poetry of Hesiod and that it must have been composed around 660–650 BC at the earliest, with the Odyssey up to a generation later. He also interprets passages in the Iliad as showing knowledge of historical events that occurred in the ancient Near East during the middle of the seventh century BC, including the destruction of Babylon by Sennacherib in 689 BC and the Sack of Thebes by Ashurbanipal in 664/663 BC. At the other extreme, a few American scholars such as Gregory Nagy see "Homer" as a continually evolving tradition, which grew much more stable as the tradition progressed, but which did not fully cease to continue changing and evolving until as late as the middle of the second century BC.

Comparative scholarship has also placed Homeric epic within a broader eastern Mediterranean tradition. Scholars have identified parallels in mythic motifs, narrative structures, and compositional techniques between the Iliad and the Odyssey and ancient Anatolian, Mesopotamian, and Levantine poetry; especially the Epic of Gilgamesh. Whether such parallels reflect the reception of particular Near Eastern narratives or participation in a wider oral and performative tradition remains debated.

"Homer" is a name of unknown etymological origin, around which many theories were erected in antiquity. One such linkage was to the Greek ὅμηρος (hómēros 'hostage' or 'surety'). The explanations suggested by modern scholars tend to mirror their position on the overall Homeric Question. Nagy interprets it as "he who fits (the song) together". West has advanced both possible Greek and Phoenician etymologies.

== Historicity of the Homeric epics and Homeric society ==
Greece according to the Iliad

Scholars continue to debate questions such as whether the Trojan War took place – and if so when and where – and to what extent the society depicted by Homer is based on his own or one which was, even at the time of the poems' composition, known only as legends. The Homeric epics are largely set in the east and center of the Mediterranean, with some scattered references to Egypt, Ethiopia and other distant lands, in a warlike society that resembles that of the Greek world slightly before the hypothesized date of the poems' composition.

In ancient Greek chronology, the sack of Troy was dated to 1184 BC. By the nineteenth century, there was widespread scholarly skepticism that the Trojan War had ever happened and that Troy had even existed, but in 1873 Heinrich Schliemann announced to the world that he had discovered the ruins of Homer's Troy at Hisarlik in modern Turkey. Some contemporary scholars think the destruction of Troy VIIa c. 1220 BC was the origin of the myth of the Trojan War, others that the poem was inspired by multiple similar sieges that took place over the centuries.

Most scholars now agree that the Homeric poems depict customs and elements of the material world that are derived from different periods of Greek history. For instance, the heroes in the poems use bronze weapons, characteristic of the Bronze Age in which the poems are set, rather than the later Iron Age during which they were composed; yet the same heroes are cremated (an Iron Age practice) rather than buried (as they were in the Bronze Age). In some parts of the Homeric poems, heroes are described as carrying large shields like those used by warriors during the Mycenaean period, but, in other places, they are instead described carrying the smaller shields that were commonly used when the poems were written in the early Iron Age.

In the Iliad 10.260–265, Odysseus is described as wearing a helmet made of boar's tusks. Such helmets were not worn in Homer's time but were commonly worn by aristocratic warriors between 1600 and 1150 BC.

The decipherment of Linear B in the 1950s by Michael Ventris and continued archaeological investigation has increased modern scholars' understanding of the Bronze Age Aegean civilisation, which in many ways resembles the ancient Near East more than the society described by Homer. Some aspects of the Homeric world are simply made up; for instance, the Iliad 22.145–56 describes two springs that run near the city of Troy, one that runs steaming hot and the other that runs icy cold. It is here that Hector takes his final stand against Achilles. Archaeologists, however, have uncovered no evidence that springs of this description ever actually existed.

== Style and language ==
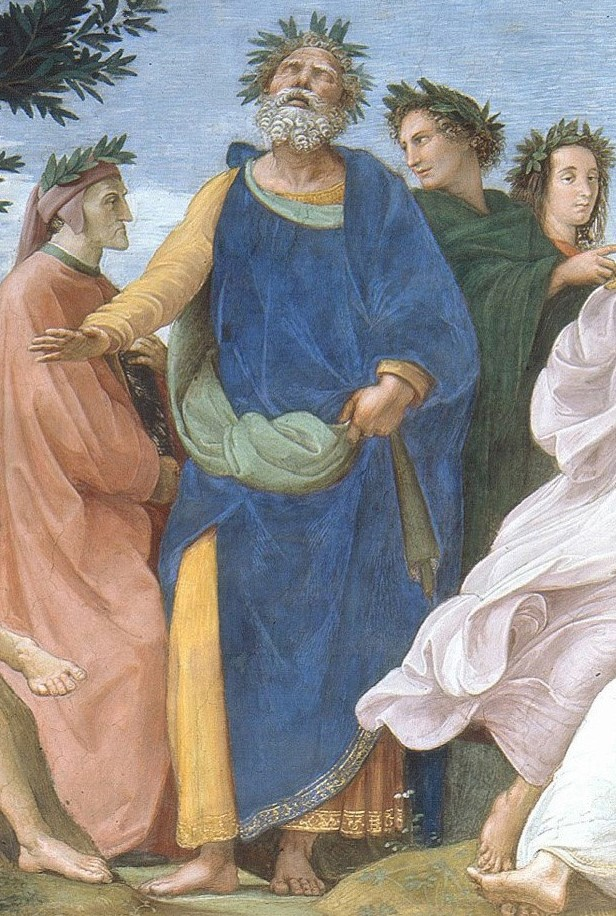
Detail of The Parnassus (painted 1509–1510) by Raphael, depicting Homer wearing a crown of laurels atop Mount Parnassus, with Dante on his right, in red, and Virgil on his left, in green.

The Homeric epics are written in an artificial literary language or "Kunstsprache" only used in epic hexameter poetry. Homeric Greek shows features of multiple regional Greek dialects and periods but is fundamentally based on Ionic Greek, in keeping with the tradition that Homer was from Ionia. Linguistic analysis suggests that the Iliad was composed slightly before the Odyssey and that Homeric formulae preserve features older than other parts of the poems.

The poems were composed in unrhymed dactylic hexameters; the ancient Greek metre was quantity-based rather than stress-based. Homer frequently uses set phrases such as epithets ("crafty Odysseus", "rosy-fingered Dawn", "owl-eyed Athena", etc.), Homeric formulae ("and then answered [him/her], Agamemnon, king of men", "when the early-born rose-fingered Dawn came to light", "thus he/she spoke"), simile, type scenes, ring composition and repetition. These habits aid the extemporizing bard and are characteristic of oral poetry. For instance, the main words of a Homeric sentence are generally placed towards the beginning, whereas literate poets like Virgil or Milton use longer and more complicated syntactical structures. Homer then expands on these ideas in subsequent clauses; this technique is called parataxis.

The so-called "type scenes" (typische Szenen), were named by Walter Arend in 1933. He noted that Homer often, when describing frequently recurring activities such as eating, praying, fighting and dressing, used blocks of set phrases in sequence that were then elaborated by the poet. The "Analyst" school had considered these repetitions as un-Homeric, whereas Arend interpreted them philosophically. Parry and Lord noted that these conventions are found in many other cultures.

Both of the Homeric poems begin with an invocation to the Muse. In the Iliad, the poet beseeches her to sing of "the anger of Achilles", and in the Odyssey, he asks her to tell of "the man of many ways". A similar opening was later employed by Virgil in his Aeneid.

"Ring composition" or chiastic structure (when a phrase or idea is repeated at both the beginning and end of a story, or a series of such ideas first appears in the order A, B, C ... before being reversed as ... C, B, A) has been observed in the Homeric epics. Opinion differs as to whether these occurrences are a conscious artistic device, a mnemonic aid or a spontaneous feature of human storytelling. Daniel Mendelsohn writes that "in ring composition, the narrator will start to tell a story only to pause and loop back to some earlier moment that helps explain an aspect of the story he's telling." Euryclea's recognition of Odysseus's scar while washing his feet leads to a flashback explaining how he got the scar.

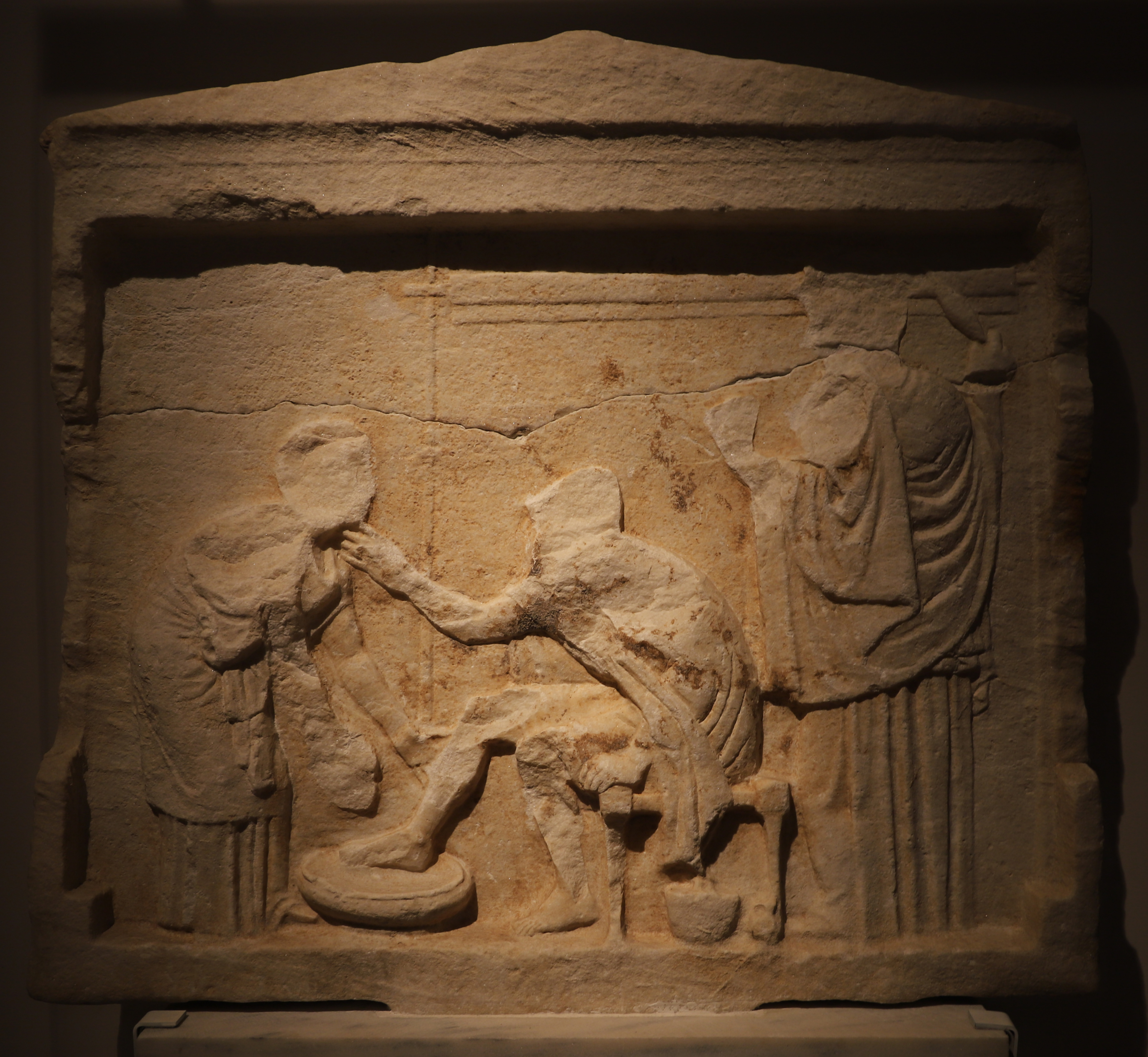
Euryclea recognises Odysseus, 4th-century BC votive relief from Thessaly, Greece

Erich Auerbach considers that scene to be a landmark in the history of mimesis: "There is also room and time for orderly, perfectly well-articuated, uniformly illuminated descriptions of implements, ministrations, and gestures: even in the dramatic moment of recognition, Homer does not omit to tell the reader that it is with his right hand that Odysseus takes the old woman by the throat to keep her from speaking, at the same time that he draws her closer to him with his left. Clearly outlined, brightly and uniformly illuminated, men and things stand out in a realm where everything is visible; and not less clear—wholly expressed, orderly even in their ardor—are the feelings and thoughts of the persons involved."

== Textual transmission ==
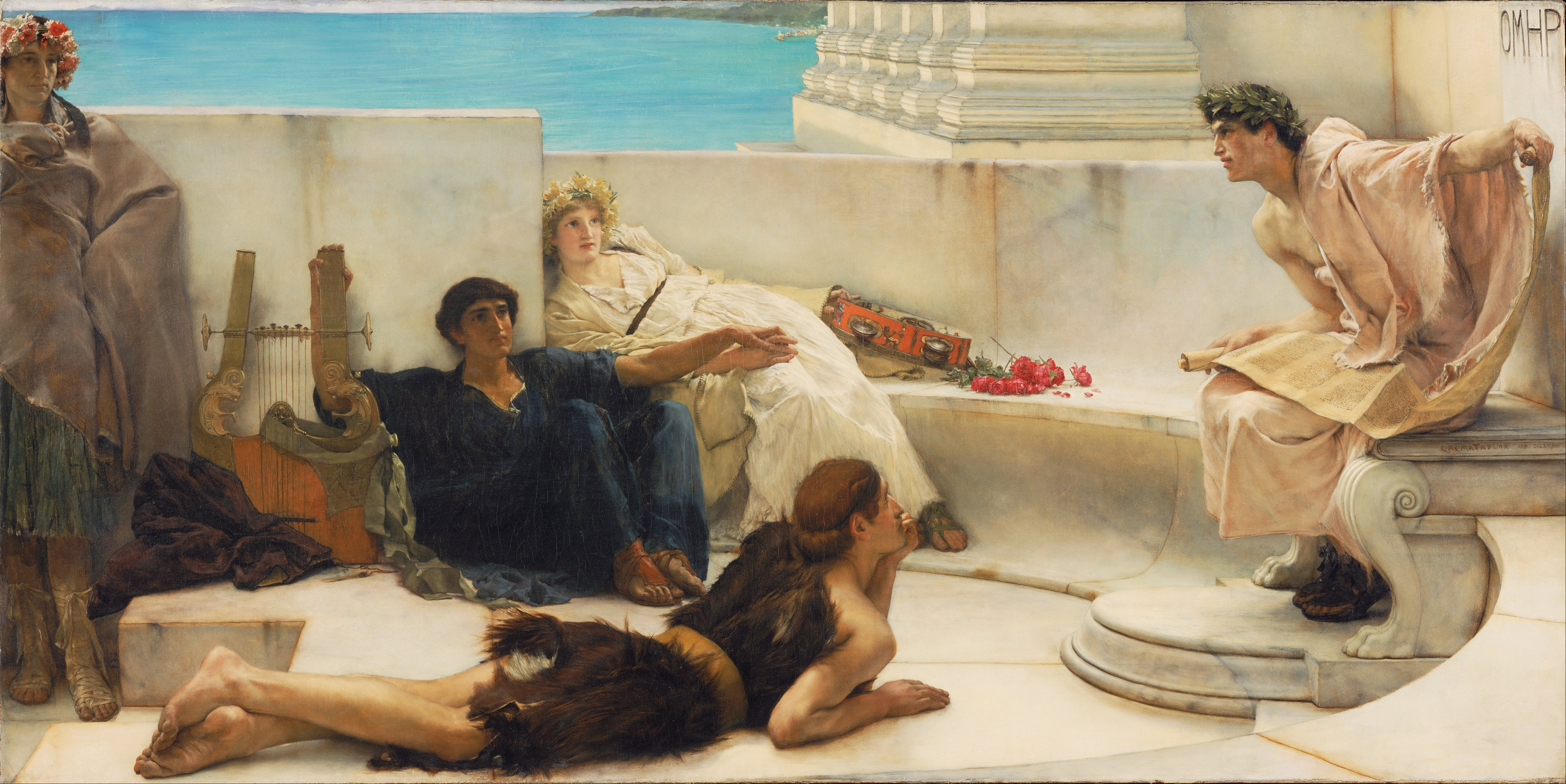
A Reading from Homer (1885) by Lawrence Alma-Tadema

The orally transmitted Homeric poems were put into written form at some point between the eighth and sixth centuries BC. Some scholars believe that they were dictated to a scribe by the poet and that the current versions of the Iliad and Odyssey were in origin orally dictated texts. Albert Lord noted that the Balkan bards that he was studying revised and expanded their songs in their process of dictating. Some scholars hypothesise that a similar process of revision and expansion occurred when the Homeric poems were first written down.

Other scholars hold that, after the poems were created in the eighth century, they continued to be orally transmitted with considerable revision until they were written down in the sixth century. After textualisation, the poems were each divided into 24 rhapsodes, today referred to as books, and labelled by the letters of the Greek alphabet. Most scholars attribute the book divisions to the Hellenistic scholars of Alexandria, in Egypt. Some trace the divisions back further to the Classical period. Very few credit Homer himself with the divisions.

In antiquity, it was widely held that the Homeric poems were collected and organised in Athens in the late sixth century BC by Pisistratus (died 528/527 BC), in what subsequent scholars have dubbed the "Peisistratean recension". The idea that the Homeric poems were originally transmitted orally and first written down during the reign of Pisistratus is referenced by the first-century BC Roman orator Cicero and is also referenced in several other surviving sources, including two ancient Lives of Homer. From around 150 BC, the texts of the Homeric poems found in papyrus fragments exhibit much less variation, and the text seems to have become relatively stable. After the establishment of the Library of Alexandria, Homeric scholars such as Zenodotus of Ephesus, Aristophanes of Byzantium and in particular Aristarchus of Samothrace helped establish a canonical text.

The first printed edition of Homer was produced in 1488 in Florence, Italy, by Demetrios Chalkokondyles. Today scholars use medieval manuscripts, papyri and other sources; some argue for a "multi-text" view, rather than seeking a single definitive text. The nineteenth-century edition of Arthur Ludwich mainly follows Aristarchus's work, whereas van Thiel's (1991, 1996) follows the medieval vulgate. Others, such as Martin West (1998–2000) or T. W. Allen, fall somewhere between these two extremes.

== Legacy ==
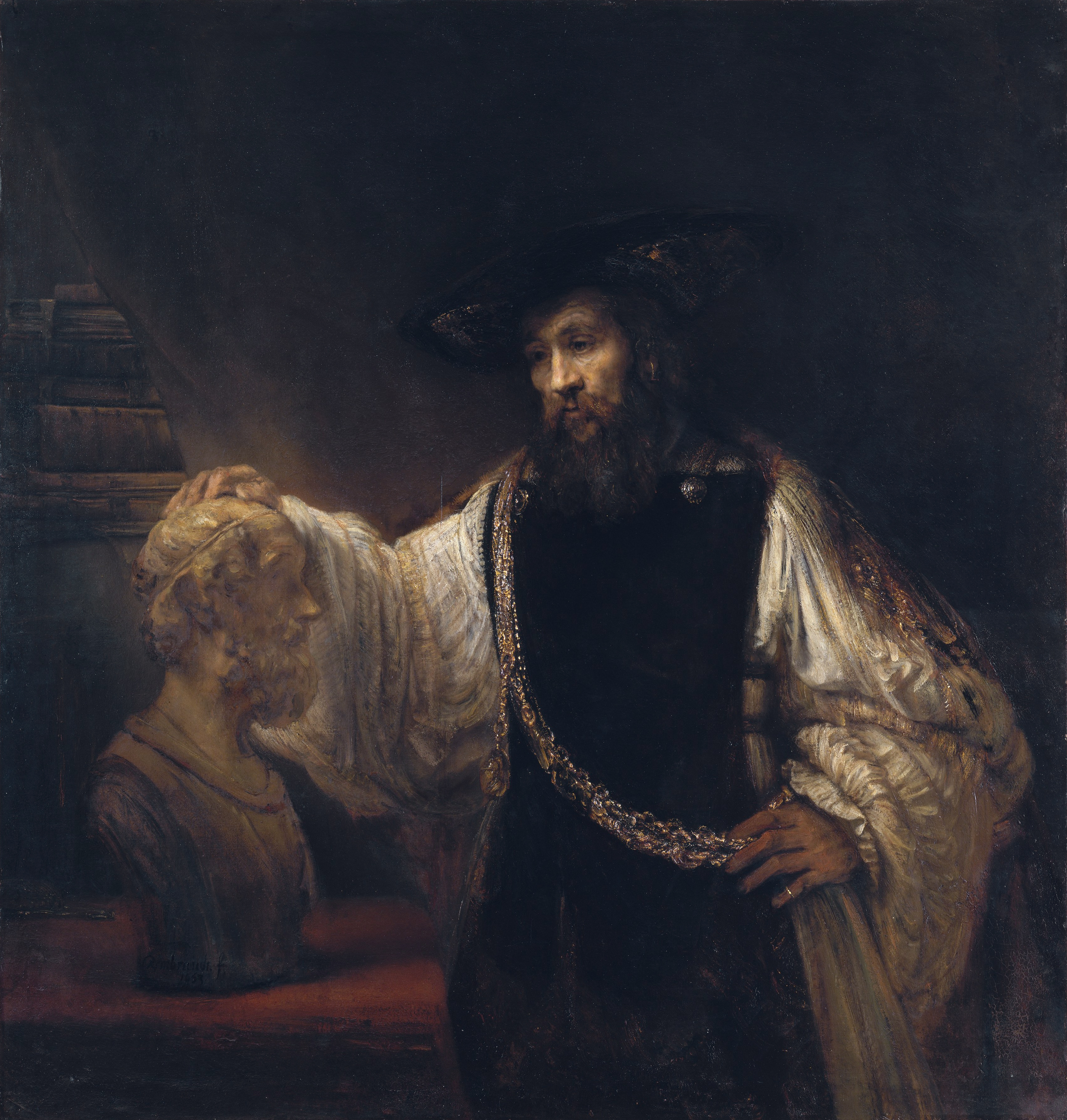
Aristotle With a Bust of Homer (1653) by Rembrandt

William Strunk and E. B. White write: "The greatest writers—Homer, Dante, Shakespeare—are effective largely because they deal in particulars and report the details that matter. Their words call up pictures."

Homer's epics are templates for later stories. Virgil's Aeneid is heavily influenced by Homer. Alfred, Lord Tennyson's poem "Ulysses" imagines an aged Odysseus returned to Ithaca. James Joyce's Ulysses retells the Odyssey as a single Dublin day. Derek Walcott's Omeros retells the Iliad and Odyssey in a Caribbean fishing village. The Coen Brothers's O Brother, Where Art Thou? is a loose retelling of the Odyssey in Depression-era Missisippi. John Keats recalled his first encounter with George Chapman's translation of Homer:

Then felt I like some watcher of the skies
When a new planet swims into his ken;
Or like stout Cortez when with eagle eyes
He star'd at the Pacific—and all his men
Look'd at each other with a wild surmise—
Silent, upon a peak in Darien.

— John Keats, "On First Looking Into Chapman's Homer"

== See also ==
- Achaeans (Homer)
- Bibliomancy
- Catalogue of Ships
- Creophylus of Samos
- Cyclic Poets
- Deception of Zeus
- Early Greek cosmology
- Geography of the Odyssey
- Greek mythology
- Homeric psychology
- Homer's Ithaca
- List of Homeric characters
- Sortes Homericae
- Tabulae Iliacae
- Telemachy
- The Golden Bough
- Trojan Battle Order
- Trojan War in literature and the arts
- Venetus A manuscript

== Bibliography ==
- Auerbach, Erich (1953). "Odysseus' Scar". Mimesis: The Representation of Reality in Western Literature. Princeton: Princeton University Press. (orig. publ. in German, 1946, Bern)
- Finkelberg, Margalit, ed. (2012). The Homer Encyclopedia. Wiley. doi:10.1002/9781444350302. ISBN 978-1-4051-7768-9.
- Fowler, Robert, ed. (2004). The Cambridge Companion to Homer. Cambridge: Cambridge University Press. ISBN 978-0-521-01246-1 – via Internet Archive.
- Graziosi, Barbara (2002). Inventing Homer: The Early Perception of Epic. Cambridge Classical Studies. Cambridge: Cambridge University Press. ISBN 978-0-521-80966-5.
- Morris, Ian; Powell, Barry B., eds. (1997). A New Companion to Homer. Leiden: Brill Publishers. ISBN 978-90-04-09989-0.

=== Editions ===
Texts in Homeric Greek

- Demetrius Chalcondyles editio princeps, Florence, 1488
- the Aldine editions (1504 and 1517)
- 1st ed. with comments, Micyllus and Camerarius, Basel, 1535, 1541 (improved text), 1551 (incl. the Batrachomyomachia)
- Th. Ridel, Strasbourg, c. 1572, 1588 and 1592.
- Wolf (Halle, 1794–1795; Leipzig, 1804 1807)
- Spitzner (Gotha, 1832–1836)
- Bekker (Berlin, 1843; Bonn, 1858)
- La Roche (Odyssey, 1867–1868; Iliad, 1873–1876, both at Leipzig)
- Ludwich (Odyssey, Leipzig, 1889–1891; Iliad, 2 vols, 1901 and 1907)
- W. Leaf (Iliad, London, 1886–1888; 2nd ed. 1900–1902)
- William Walter Merry and James Riddell (Odyssey i–xii, 2nd ed., Oxford, 1886)
- Monro, D. B. (Odyssey xiii–xxiv with appendices, Oxford, 1901)
- Monro, D. B. and Allen, T. W. (Iliad), and Allen (Odyssey, 1908, Oxford)
- D. B. Monro and T. W. Allen 1917–1920, Homeri Opera (5 volumes: Iliad=3rd edition, Odyssey=2nd edition), Oxford, ISBN 0-19-814528-4, 0-19-814529-2, 0-19-814531-4, 0-19-814532-2, 0-19-814534-9
- H. van Thiel 1991, Homeri Odyssea, Hildesheim, ISBN 3-487-09458-4, 1996, Homeri Ilias, Hildesheim, ISBN 3-487-09459-2
- P. von der Mühll 1993, Homeri Odyssea, Munich/Leipzig, ISBN 3-598-71432-7
- M. L. West 1998–2000, Homeri Ilias (2 volumes), Munich/Leipzig, ISBN 3-598-71431-9, 3-598-71435-1
- M. L. West 2017, Homerus Odyssea, Berlin/Boston, ISBN 3-11-042539-4

=== Interlinear translations ===
- The Iliad of Homer a Parsed Interlinear, Handheldclassics.com (2008) Text, ISBN 978-1-60725-298-6

=== English translations ===
This is a partial list of translations into English of Homer's Iliad and Odyssey:

- Robert Fitzgerald (1910–1985)
  - The Iliad, Farrar, Straus and Giroux (2004) ISBN 0-374-52905-1
  - The Odyssey, Farrar, Straus and Giroux (1998) ISBN 0-374-52574-9
- Robert Fagles (1933–2008)
  - The Iliad, Penguin Classics (1998) ISBN 0-14-027536-3
  - The Odyssey, Penguin Classics (1999) ISBN 0-14-026886-3
- Stanley Lombardo (b. 1943)
  - Iliad, Hackett Publishing Company (1997) ISBN 0-87220-352-2
  - Odyssey, Hackett Publishing Company (2000) ISBN 0-87220-484-7
  - Iliad, (Audiobook) Parmenides (2006) ISBN 1-930972-08-3
  - Odyssey, (Audiobook) Parmenides (2006) ISBN 1-930972-06-7
  - The Essential Homer, (Audiobook) Parmenides (2006) ISBN 1-930972-12-1
  - The Essential Iliad, (Audiobook) Parmenides (2006) ISBN 1-930972-10-5
- Barry B. Powell (b. 1942)
  - Iliad, Oxford University Press (2013) ISBN 978-0-19-932610-5
  - Odyssey, Oxford University Press (2014) ISBN 978-0-19-936031-4
  - Homer's Iliad and Odyssey: The Essential Books, Oxford University Press (2014) ISBN 978-0-19-939407-4
- Samuel Butler (1835–1902)
  - The Iliad, Red and Black Publishers (2008) ISBN 978-1-934941-04-1
  - The Odyssey, Red and Black Publishers (2008) ISBN 978-1-934941-05-8
- Emily Wilson (b. 1971)
  - The Odyssey, W. W. Norton (2017) ISBN 978-0-393-08905-9
  - The Iliad, W. W. Norton (2023) ISBN 9781324001805

=== General works on Homer ===
- Carlier, Pierre (1999). Homère (in French). Paris: Les éditions Fayard. ISBN 978-2-213-60381-0.
- de Romilly, Jacqueline (2005). Homère (5th ed.). Paris: Presses Universitaires de France. ISBN 978-2-13-054830-0.
- Latacz, J. (2004). Troy and Homer: Towards a Solution of an Old Mystery. Translated by Windle, Kevin; Ireland, Rosh. Oxford: Oxford University Press. ISBN 978-0-19-926308-0. In German, 5th updated and expanded edition, Leipzig, 2005. In Spanish, 2003 ISBN 84-233-3487-2. In modern Greek, 2005 ISBN 960-16-1557-1
- Monro, David Binning (1911). "Homer" . In Chisholm, Hugh (ed.). Encyclopædia Britannica. Vol. 12 (11th ed.). Cambridge University Press. pp. 626–639.
- Powell, Barry B. (2007). Homer (2nd ed.). Malden, Massachusetts; Oxford, UK; Carlton, Victoria: Wiley-Blackwell. ISBN 978-1-4051-5325-6.
- Vidal-Naquet, Pierre (2000). Le monde d'Homère (in French). Paris: Perrin. ISBN 978-2-262-01181-9.
- Wace, Alan; Stubbings, F. H. (1962). A Companion to Homer. London: Macmillan Publishers.

=== Influential readings and interpretations ===
- de Jong, Irene J. F. (2004). Narrators and Focalizers: the Presentation of the Story in the Iliad (2nd ed.). London: Bristol Classical Press. ISBN 978-1-85399-658-0.
- Edwards, Mark W. (1987). Homer, Poet of the Iliad. Baltimore: Johns Hopkins University Press. ISBN 978-0-8018-3329-8.
- Fenik, Bernard (1974). Studies in the Odyssey. Hermes, Einzelschriften 30. Wiesbaden: Steiner.
- Finley, Moses (2002). The World of Odysseus. New York: The New York Review of Books. ISBN 978-1-59017-017-5.
- Nagy, Gregory (1979). The Best of the Achaeans: Concepts of the Hero in Archaic Greek Poetry. Baltimore; London: Johns Hopkins University Press.
- Nagy, Gregory (2010). Homer: the Preclassic. Berkeley: University of California Press. ISBN 978-0-520-95024-5.
- Reece, Steve (1993). The Stranger's Welcome: Oral Theory and the Aesthetics of the Homeric Hospitality Scene. Ann Arbor: University of Michigan Press.

=== Commentaries ===
- Iliad:
  - P.V. Jones (ed.) 2003, Homer's Iliad. A Commentary on Three Translations, London ISBN 1-85399-657-2
  - G. S. Kirk (gen. ed.) 1985–1993, The Iliad: A Commentary (6 volumes), Cambridge ISBN 0-521-28171-7, 0-521-28172-5, 0-521-28173-3, 0-521-28174-1, 0-521-31208-6, 0-521-31209-4
  - Joachim Latacz (gen. ed.) 2002, Homers Ilias. Gesamtkommentar. Auf der Grundlage der Ausgabe von Ameis-Hentze-Cauer (1868–1913) (6 volumes published so far, of an estimated 15), Munich/Leipzig ISBN 3-598-74307-6, ISBN 3-598-74304-1
  - N. Postlethwaite (ed.) 2000, Homer's Iliad: A Commentary on the Translation of Richmond Lattimore, Exeter ISBN 0-85989-684-6
  - M. W. Willcock (ed.) 1976, A Companion to the Iliad, Chicago ISBN 0-226-89855-5
- Odyssey:
  - A. Heubeck (gen. ed.) 1990–1993, A Commentary on Homer's Odyssey (3 volumes; orig. publ. 1981–1987 in Italian), Oxford ISBN 0-19-814747-3, ISBN 0-19-872144-7, ISBN 0-19-814953-0
  - P. Jones (ed.) 1988, Homer's Odyssey: A Commentary based on the English Translation of Richmond Lattimore, Bristol ISBN 1-85399-038-8
  - I. J. F. de Jong (ed.) 2001, A Narratological Commentary on the Odyssey, Cambridge ISBN 0-521-46844-2

=== Dating the Homeric poems ===
- Janko, Richard (1982). Homer, Hesiod and the Hymns: Diachronic Development in Epic Diction. Cambridge Classical Studies. Cambridge: Cambridge University Press. ISBN 978-0-521-23869-4.
