= Early life of Marcus Aurelius =

Marcus Aurelius
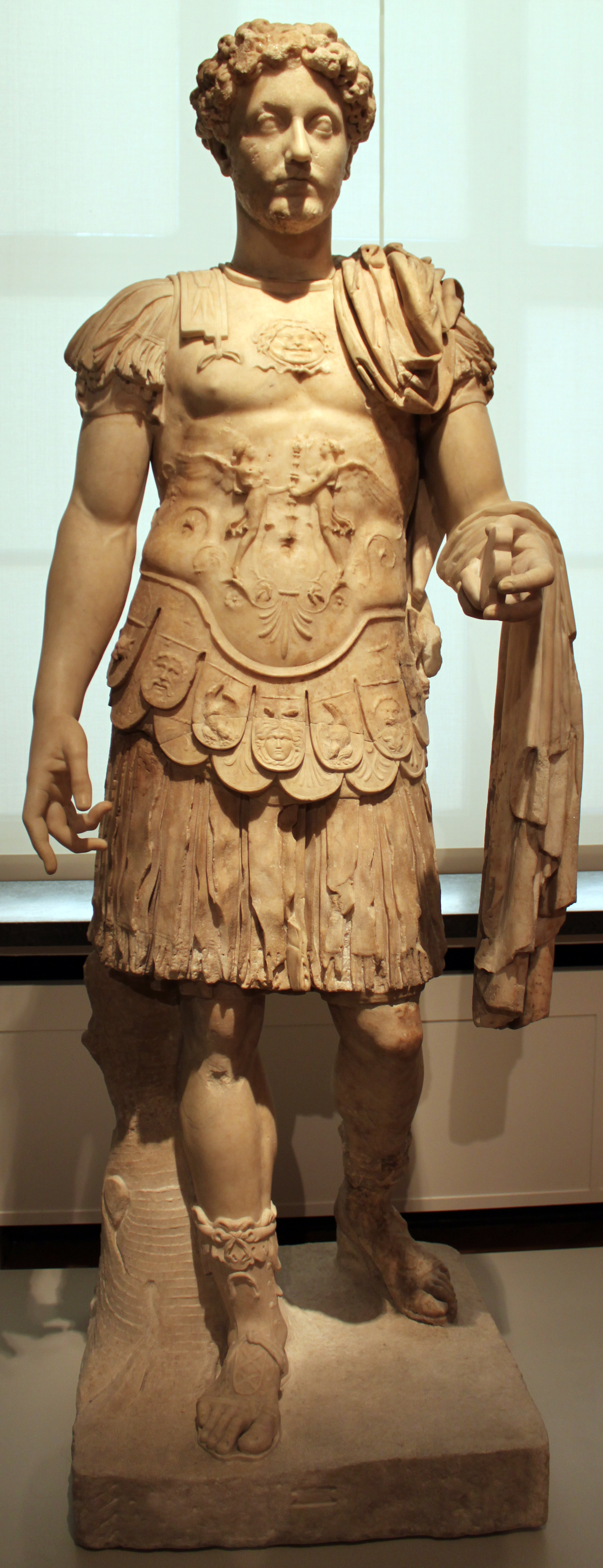
- Marble statue of a young Marcus in military garb, wearing the muscle cuirass, Altes Museum, Berlin

Emperor of the Roman Empire
- Reign: 8 March 161 – 17 March 180
- Predecessor: Antoninus Pius
- Successor: Commodus
- Co-emperors: Lucius Verus (161–169); Commodus (177–180)
- Born: Marcus Annius Verus; 26 April 121; Rome
- Died: 17 March 180 (aged 58); Vindobona or Sirmium
- Burial: Hadrian's Mausoleum
- Spouse: Faustina the Younger
- Issue: 14, incl. Commodus, Marcus Annius Verus, Antoninus and Lucilla
Regnal name
- Marcus Aurelius Antoninus Augustus
- Dynasty: Nerva-Antonine
- Father: Marcus Annius Verus; Antoninus Pius (adoptive)
- Mother: Domitia Lucilla Minor

The early life of Marcus Aurelius (r. 161–180) spans the time from his birth on 26 April 121 until his accession as Roman emperor on 8 March 161.

Following the death of his father, Marcus Annius Verus (III), Marcus Aurelius was raised by his grandfather, Marcus Annius Verus (II). Educated at home, Marcus became an adherent of Stoicism at a young age. In 138 he was adopted by Titus Aurelius Antoninus, himself the adopted heir of Emperor Hadrian. Hadrian died later that year, and his adoptive son succeeded him under the name Antoninus Pius.

Among Marcus' tutors were the orators Marcus Cornelius Fronto and Herodes Atticus. Marcus held the consulship jointly with Antoninus Pius in 140 and in 145. In between his first and second consulships, Marcus served as a quaestor. In 145 he married his first cousin, Pius' daughter Faustina. They had a number of children, including the future empress Lucilla and the future emperor Commodus. Marcus took on more responsibilities of state as Pius aged; at the time of Pius' death in 161, he was consul with his adoptive brother Lucius. Upon their adoptive father's death, Marcus and Lucius became co-emperors.

== Sources ==
The major sources for the life and rule of Marcus Aurelius are patchy and frequently unreliable. This is particularly true of his youth. The biographies contained in the Historia Augusta claim to be written by a group of authors at the turn of the fourth century, but are in fact written by a single author (referred to here as "the biographer") from the later fourth century (c. 395). The later biographies and the biographies of subordinate emperors and usurpers are a tissue of lies and fiction, but the earlier biographies, derived primarily from now-lost earlier sources (Marius Maximus or Ignotus), are much better. For Marcus' life and rule, the biographies of Hadrian, Pius, Marcus himself and Lucius Verus are largely reliable, but those of Aelius Verus and Avidius Cassius are full of fiction.

A body of correspondence between Marcus' tutor Fronto and various Antonine officials (with a focus on Marcus himself) survives in a series of patchy manuscripts, covering the period from c. 138 to 166. Marcus' own Meditations offer a window on his inner life, but are largely undateable, and make few specific references to worldly affairs. The main narrative source for the period is Cassius Dio, a Greek senator from Bithynian Nicaea who wrote a history of Rome from its founding to 229 in eighty books. Dio is vital for the military history of the period, but his senatorial prejudices and strong opposition to imperial expansion obscure his perspective. Some other literary sources provide specific detail: the writings of the physician Galen on the habits of the Antonine elite, the orations of Aelius Aristides on the temper of the times, and the constitutions preserved in the Digest and Codex Justinianus on Marcus' legal work. Inscriptions and coin finds supplement the literary sources.

== Family and childhood ==
The gens Annia, to which Marcus belonged, had an undistinguished history. Their only famous member was Titus Annius Milo, a man known for hastening the end of the free republic through his use of political violence. Marcus' paternal family originated in Ucubi, a small town southeast of Córdoba in Iberian Baetica. The family rose to prominence in the late first century AD. Marcus' great-grandfather Marcus Annius Verus (I) was a senator and (according to the Historia Augusta) ex-praetor; in 73–74 his grandfather Marcus Annius Verus (II) was made a patrician. Cassius Dio asserts that the Annii were near-kin of Hadrian, and that it was to these familial ties that they owed their rise to power. The precise nature of these kinship ties is nowhere stated. One conjectural bond runs through Annius Verus (II). Verus' wife Rupilia Faustina was the daughter of the consular senator Libo Rupilius Frugi and a mother whose name is unknown. It has been hypothesized Rupilia Faustina's mother was Salonia Matidia, who was also the mother through another marriage of Vibia Sabina, Hadrian's wife, but the theory is not universally accepted. Anthony Birley argued that it is implausible based on Rupilia's age. Historians Strachan and Christian Settipani proposed instead Vitellia, the daughter of emperor Vitellius, as her mother. Verus' elder son—Marcus Aurelius' father—Marcus Annius Verus (III) married Domitia Lucilla Minor.

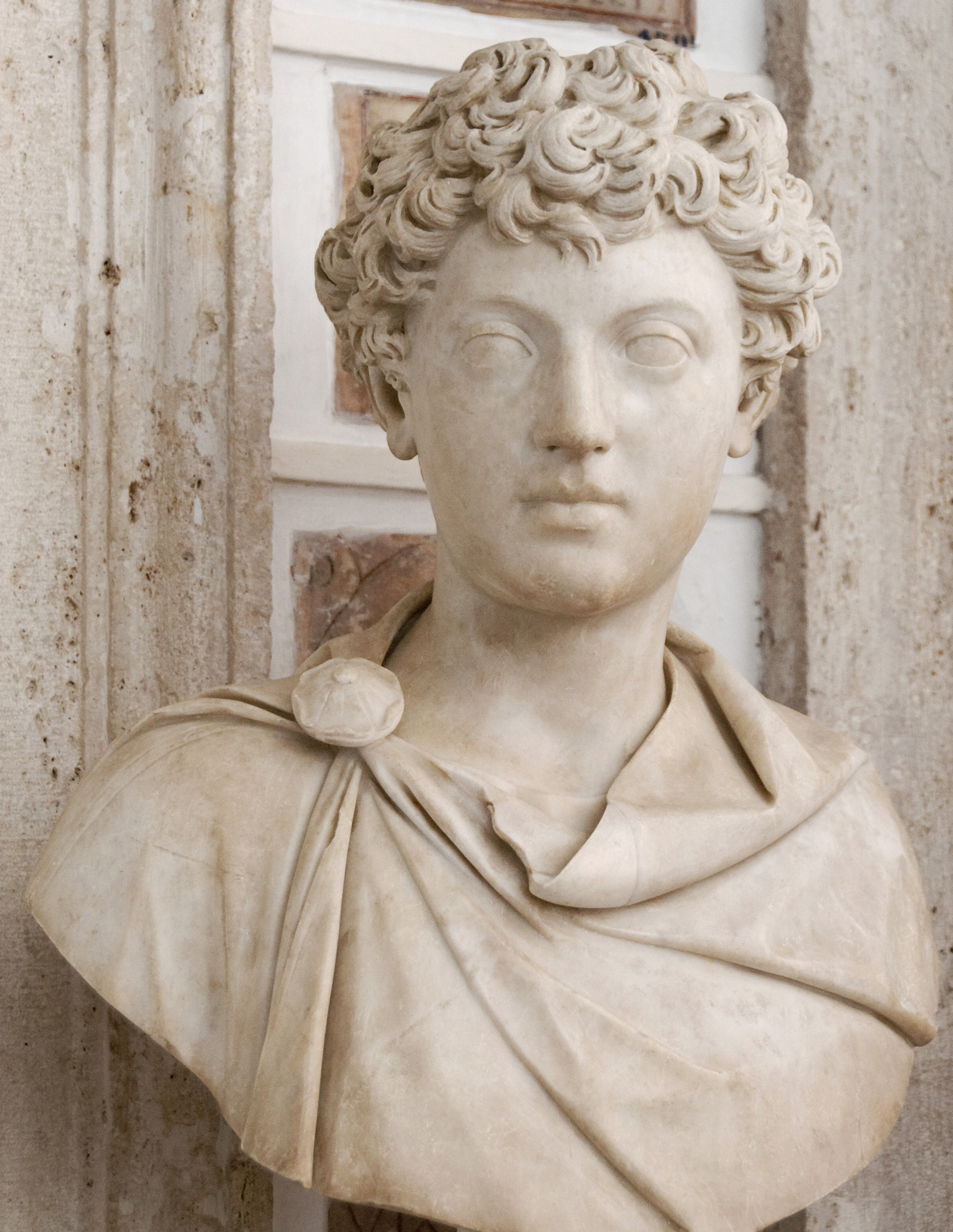
Bust of Marcus Aurelius as a young boy (Capitoline Museum). Anthony Birley, Marcus' modern biographer, writes of the bust: "This is certainly a grave young man."

Lucilla was the daughter of the patrician P. Calvisius Tullus Ruso and Domitia Lucilla Major. Lucilla Major had inherited a great fortune (described at length in one of Pliny's letters) from her maternal grandfather and her paternal grandfather by adoption. The younger Lucilla would acquire much of her mother's wealth, including a large brickworks on the outskirts of Rome—a profitable enterprise in an era when the city was experiencing a construction boom.

Lucilla and Verus (III) had two children: a son, Marcus, born on 26 April 121, and Annia Cornificia Faustina, probably born in 122 or 123. Verus (III) probably died in 124, during his praetorship, when Marcus was only three years old. (Note: Farquharson dates his death to 130, when Marcus was nine.) Though he can hardly have known him, Marcus wrote in his Meditations that he had learned "modesty and manliness" from his memories of his father and from the man's posthumous reputation. Lucilla did not remarry.

Lucilla, following prevailing aristocratic customs, probably did not spend much time with her son. Marcus was in the care of "nurses". He credits his mother with teaching him "religious piety, simplicity in diet" and how to avoid "the ways of the rich". In his letters, Marcus makes frequent and affectionate reference to her; he was grateful that, "although she was fated to die young, yet she spent her last years with me".

After his father's death, Marcus was adopted by his paternal grandfather, Marcus Annius Verus (II). Another man, Lucius Catilius Severus, also participated in his upbringing. Severus is described as his "maternal great-grandfather"; he is probably the stepfather of the elder Lucilla. Marcus was raised in the home of his mother (the Horti Domitiae Lucillae) on the Caelian Hill, a district he would affectionately refer to as "my Caelian". It was an upscale region, with few public buildings but many aristocratic villas. The most famous of these villas was the Lateran Palace, seized under Nero (r. 54–68) and thenceforth imperial property. Marcus' grandfather owned his own palace beside the Lateran, where Marcus would spend much of his childhood.

Marcus thanks his grandfather for teaching him "good character and avoidance of bad temper". He was less fond of the mistress his grandfather took and lived with after the death Rupilia Faustina, his wife and Marcus' grandmother. Anthony Birley, Marcus' modern biographer, detects a hint of sexual tension in Marcus' writings on the mistress. Marcus was grateful that he did not have to live with her longer than he did. Marcus thanks the gods that he did not lose his virginity before its due time, and even held out a bit longer. He is proud that he did not indulge himself with Benedicta or Theodotus (household slaves, presumably). (Note: Farquharson notes that, contrary to first impressions, these slaves probably were not Christians: these names were not common among Christians in this period, but are quite often found among pagan servants.)

== Early education, 128–136 ==
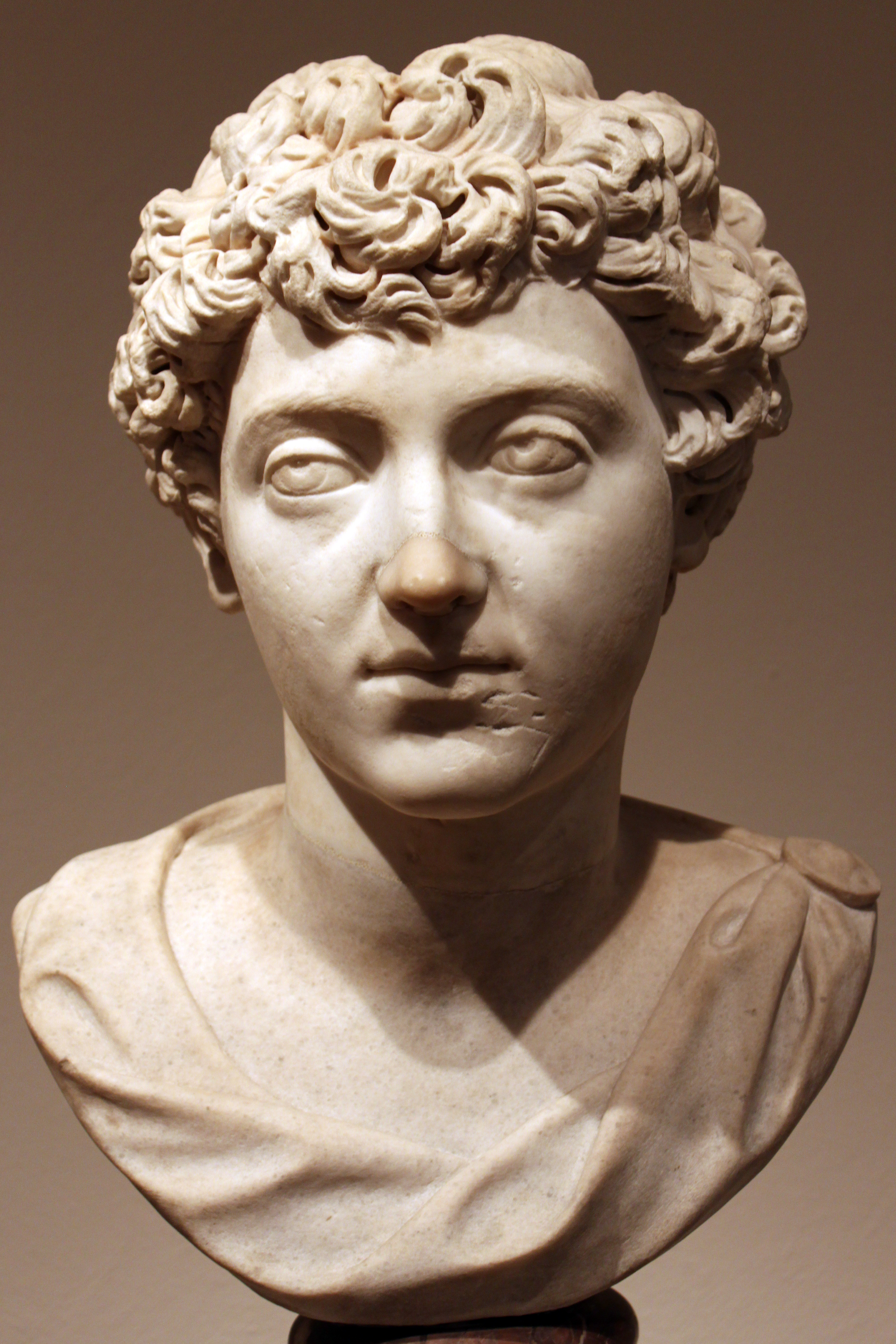
Bust of a young Marcus as the heir apparent, 138–144 AD, Altes Museum, Berlin

Marcus probably began his education at the age of seven. He was taught at home, in line with contemporary aristocratic trends; Marcus thanks his great-grandfather Catilius Severus for encouraging him to avoid public schools. Three of his childhood tutors are known: Euphoric, Geminus, and an educator whose name is unknown. These three are otherwise unattested in the ancient sources, and would probably have been household slaves or freedmen. Since Euphoric had a Greek name, he probably taught Marcus the basics of that language. (He is said to have taught Marcus literature.) Geminus is described as an actor, and he may have taught Marcus Latin pronunciation and general elocution. (Note: McLynn describes Marcus' training in drama as a series of reviews and recitations of Euripides.) The educator would have been Marcus' overall supervisor, charged with his moral welfare and general development. Marcus speaks of him with admiration in his Meditations: he taught him to "bear pain and be content with little; to work with my own hands, to mind my own business, to be slow to listen to slander". At the age of twelve, Marcus would have been ready for secondary education, under the grammatici. Two of his teachers at this age are known: Andro, a "geometrician and musician"; and Diognetus, a painting-master. Marcus thought of Diognetus as more than a mere painter, however. He seems to have introduced Marcus to the philosophic way of life. Marcus writes that Diognetus taught him "to avoid passing enthusiasms; to distrust the stories of miracle-workers and impostors about incantations and exorcism of spirits and such things; not to go cock-fighting or to get excited about such sports; to put up with outspokenness; and to become familiar with philosophy" and "to write philosophical dialogues in my boyhood". In April 132, at the behest of Diognetus, Marcus took up the dress and habits of the philosopher: he studied while wearing a rough Greek cloak, and would sleep on the ground until his mother convinced him to sleep on a bed. (Note: Marcus also thanks Diognetus for having taught him to "aspire to the camp-bed and skin coverlet and the other things which are part of the Greek training".)

A new set of tutors—Alexander of Cotiaeum, Trosius Aper, and Tuticius Proculus (Note: Birley amends the text of the HA Marcus from "Eutychius" to "Tuticius".)—took over Marcus' education in about 132 or 133. Little is known of the latter two (both teachers of Latin), but Alexander was a major littérateur, the leading Homeric scholar of his day. Marcus thanks Alexander for his training in literary styling. Alexander's influence—an emphasis on matter over style, on careful wording, with the occasional Homeric quotation—has been detected in Marcus' Meditations'' '.

== Civic duties and family connections, 127–136 ==
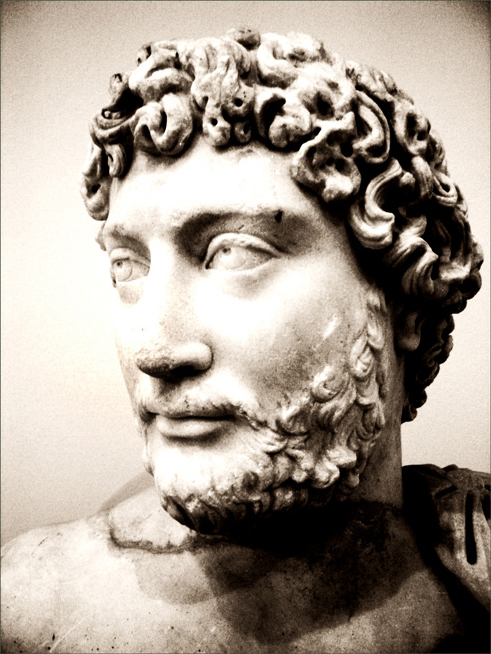
Bust of Emperor Hadrian (National Archaeological Museum of Athens). Hadrian patronized the young Marcus, and may have planned to make him his long-term successor.

In 127, at the age of six, Marcus was enrolled in the equestrian order on the recommendation of Emperor Hadrian. Though this was not completely unprecedented, and other children are known to have joined the order, Marcus was still unusually young. In 128, he was enrolled in the priestly college of the Salii. Since the standard qualifications for the college were not met—Marcus did not have two living parents—they must have been waived by Hadrian, Marcus' nominator, as a special favor to the child. Hadrian had a strong affection for Marcus, and nicknamed him Verissimus, "most true". (Note: Others put a harsher light on Hadrian's nickname. McLynn calls it an example of Hadrian's waspish (McLynn says "vespine") wit and adduces it in support of his contention that Marcus was a "prig".)

The Salii, after their name (salire: to leap, to dance), were devoted to ritual dance. Twice a year, at the Quinquatria on 19 March and the Armilustrium on 19 October, they played important roles in public ceremonies marking the opening and closing of the campaigning season. On other days in March and October (and especially during the festival of Mars from 1 to 24 March), they would march through the streets of Rome, halting at intervals to perform their ritual dances, beat their shields with staffs, and sing the Carmen Saliare, a hymn in archaic Latin. The song would have been nearly unintelligible, but Marcus learned it by heart. He took his duties seriously. Marcus rose through the offices of the priesthood, becoming in turn the leader of the dance, the vates (prophet), and the master of the order. Once, when the Salii were throwing their crowns onto the banqueting couch of the gods, as was customary, Marcus' fell on the brow of Mars. In later years, this event would be read as an auspicious omen heralding Marcus' future rule.

Hadrian did not see much of Marcus in his childhood. He spent most of his time outside Rome, on the frontier, or dealing with administrative and local affairs in the provinces. (Note: Birley, following the textual and epigraphic citations, concludes that he might only have seen Rome in 127, briefly in 128, and in 131.) By 135, however, he had returned to Italy for good. He had grown close to Lucius Ceionius Commodus, son-in-law of Gaius Avidius Nigrinus, a dear friend of Hadrian whom the emperor had killed early in his reign. In 136, shortly after, Marcus assumed the toga virilis symbolizing his passage into manhood, Hadrian arranged for his engagement to one of Commodus' daughters, Ceionia Fabia. Marcus was made prefect of the city during the feriae Latinae soon after (he was probably appointed by Commodus). Although the office held no real administrative significance—the full-time prefect remained in office during the festival—it remained a prestigious office for young aristocrats and members of the imperial family. Marcus conducted himself well at the job.

Through Commodus, Marcus met Apollonius of Chalcedon, a Stoic philosopher. Apollonius had taught Commodus and would be an enormous impact on Marcus, who would later study with him regularly. He is one of only three people Marcus thanks the gods for having met. At about this time, Marcus' sister, Annia Cornificia, married their first cousin Ummidius Quadratus. Marcus' mother asked her son to give part of his father's inheritance to Cornificia. He agreed to give her all of it, content as he was with his grandfather's estate. (Note: McLynn holds that Marcus' apparent beneficence was part of Hadrian's dynastic strategy: "Hadrian had dynastic plans of his own for Annia Cornificia and 'leaned on' Marcus to make the transfer".)

== Succession to Hadrian, 136–138 ==
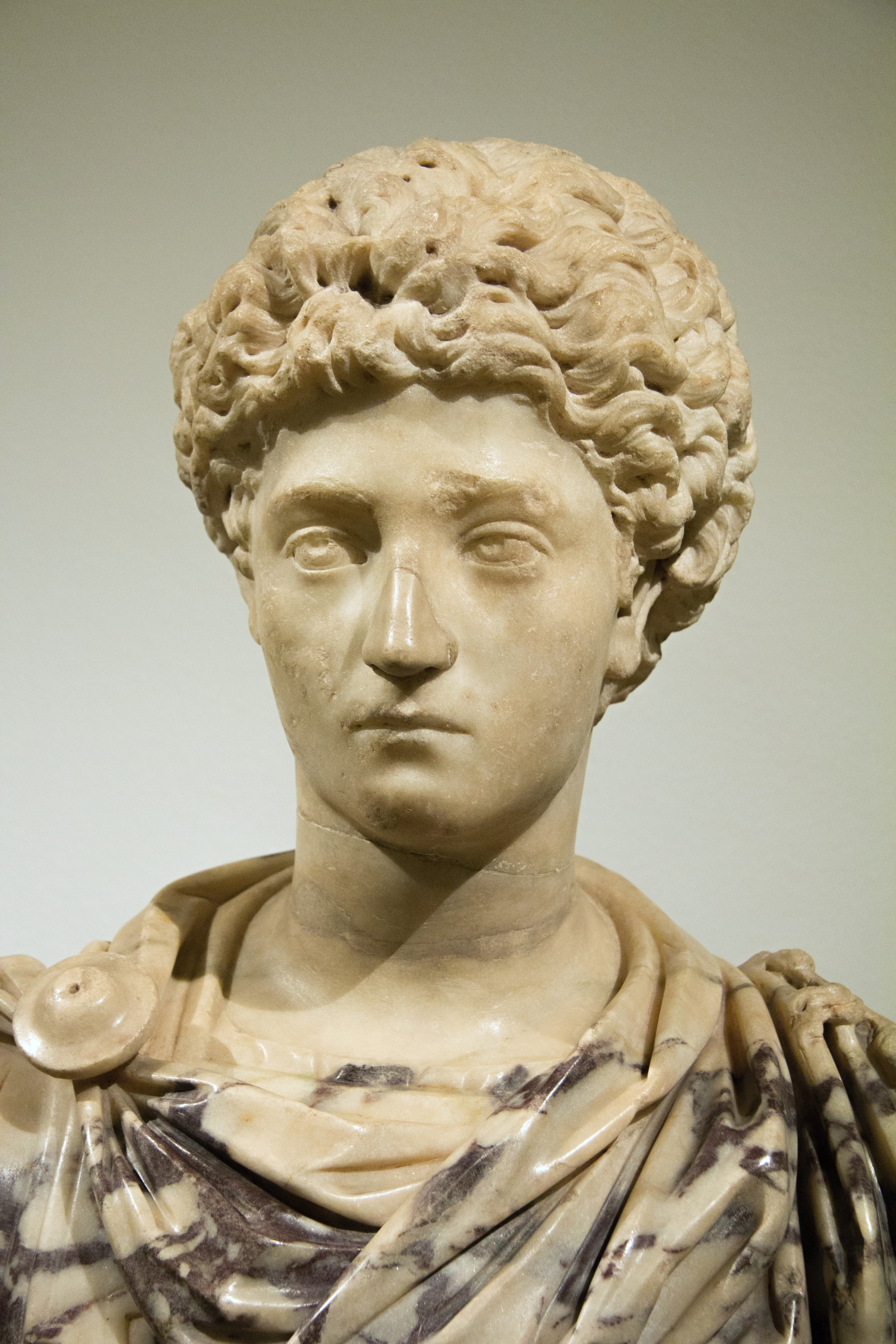
Portrait of the young Marcus on a modern bust, marble, 150–200 AD; NG Prague, Kinský Palace.

In late 136, Hadrian almost died from a haemorrhage. Convalescent in his villa at Tivoli, he selected Lucius Ceionius Commodus as his successor, and adopted him as his son. The selection was done invitis omnibus, "against the wishes of everyone"; its rationale is still unclear. As part of his adoption, Commodus took the name Lucius Aelius Caesar. After a brief stationing on the Danube frontier, Aelius returned to Rome to make an address to the Senate on the first day of 138. The night before the speech, however, he grew ill, and died of a haemorrhage later in the day. (Note: Commodus was a known consumptive at the time of his adoption, so Hadrian may have intended Marcus' eventual succession anyway.) On 24 January 138, Hadrian selected a new successor: Aurelius Antoninus, the husband of Marcus' aunt Faustina. After a few days' consideration, Antoninus accepted. He was adopted on 25 February. As part of Hadrian's terms, Antoninus adopted Marcus and Lucius Commodus, the son of Aelius. Marcus became Marcus Aelius Aurelius Verus; Lucius became Lucius Aelius Aurelius Commodus. At Hadrian's request, Antoninus' daughter, also named Faustina, was betrothed to Lucius.

The night of his adoption, Marcus had a dream. He dreamed that he had shoulders of ivory, and when asked if they could bear a burden, he found them much stronger than before. He was appalled to learn that Hadrian had adopted him. Only with reluctance did he move from his mother's house on the Caelian to Hadrian's private home.

At some time in 138, Hadrian requested in the senate that Marcus be exempt from the law barring him from becoming quaestor before his twenty-fourth birthday. The senate complied, and Marcus served under Antoninus, consul for 139. Marcus' adoption diverted him from the typical career path of his class. But for his adoption, he probably would have become triumvir monetalis, a highly regarded post involving token administration of the state mint; after that, he could have served as tribune with a legion, becoming the legion's nominal second-in-command. Marcus probably would have opted for travel and further education instead. As it was, he was set apart from his fellow citizens. Nonetheless, his biographer attests that his character remained unaffected: "He still showed the same respect to his relations as he had when he was an ordinary citizen, and he was as thrifty and careful of his possessions as he had been when he lived in a private household."

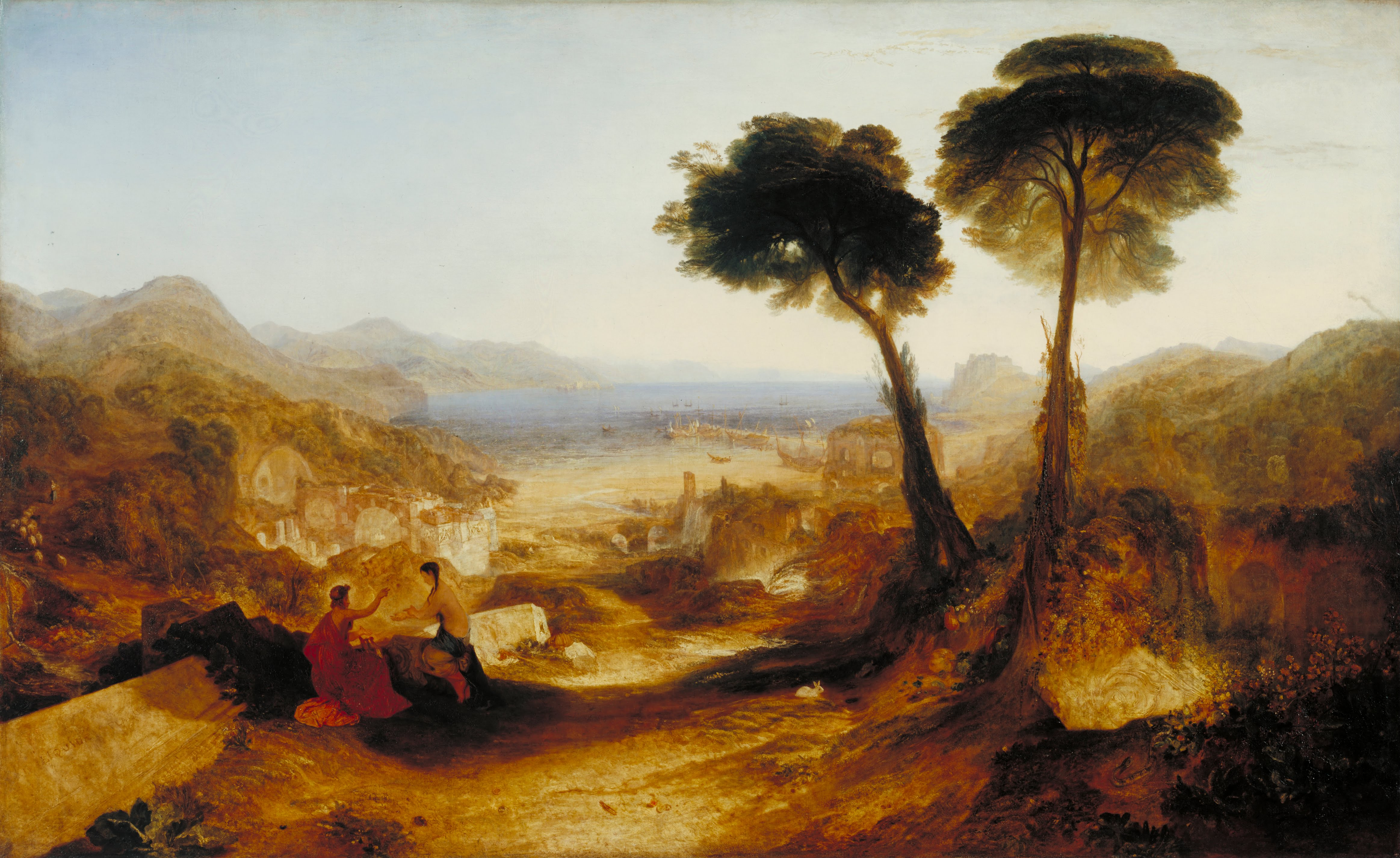
Baiae, seaside resort and site of Hadrian's last days. Marcus would holiday in the town with the imperial family in the summer of 143. (J.M.W. Turner, The Bay of Baiae, with Apollo and the Sibyl, 1823)

His attempts at suicide thwarted by Antoninus, Hadrian left for Baiae, a seaside resort on the Campanian coast. His condition did not improve, and he abandoned the diet prescribed by his doctors, indulging himself in food and drink. He sent for Antoninus, who was at his side when he died on 10 July 138. His remains were buried quietly at Puteoli. Marcus held gladiatorial games at Rome while Pius finalized Hadrian's burial arrangements. The succession to Antoninus was peaceful and stable: Antoninus kept Hadrian's nominees in office and appeased the senate, respecting its privileges and commuting the death sentences of men charged in Hadrian's last days. For his dutiful behavior, Antoninus was asked to accept the name "Pius".

== Heir to Antoninus Pius, 138–145 ==
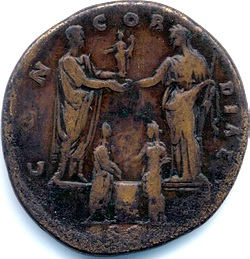
Sestertius commemorating the betrothal of Marcus Aurelius and Faustina the Younger in 139

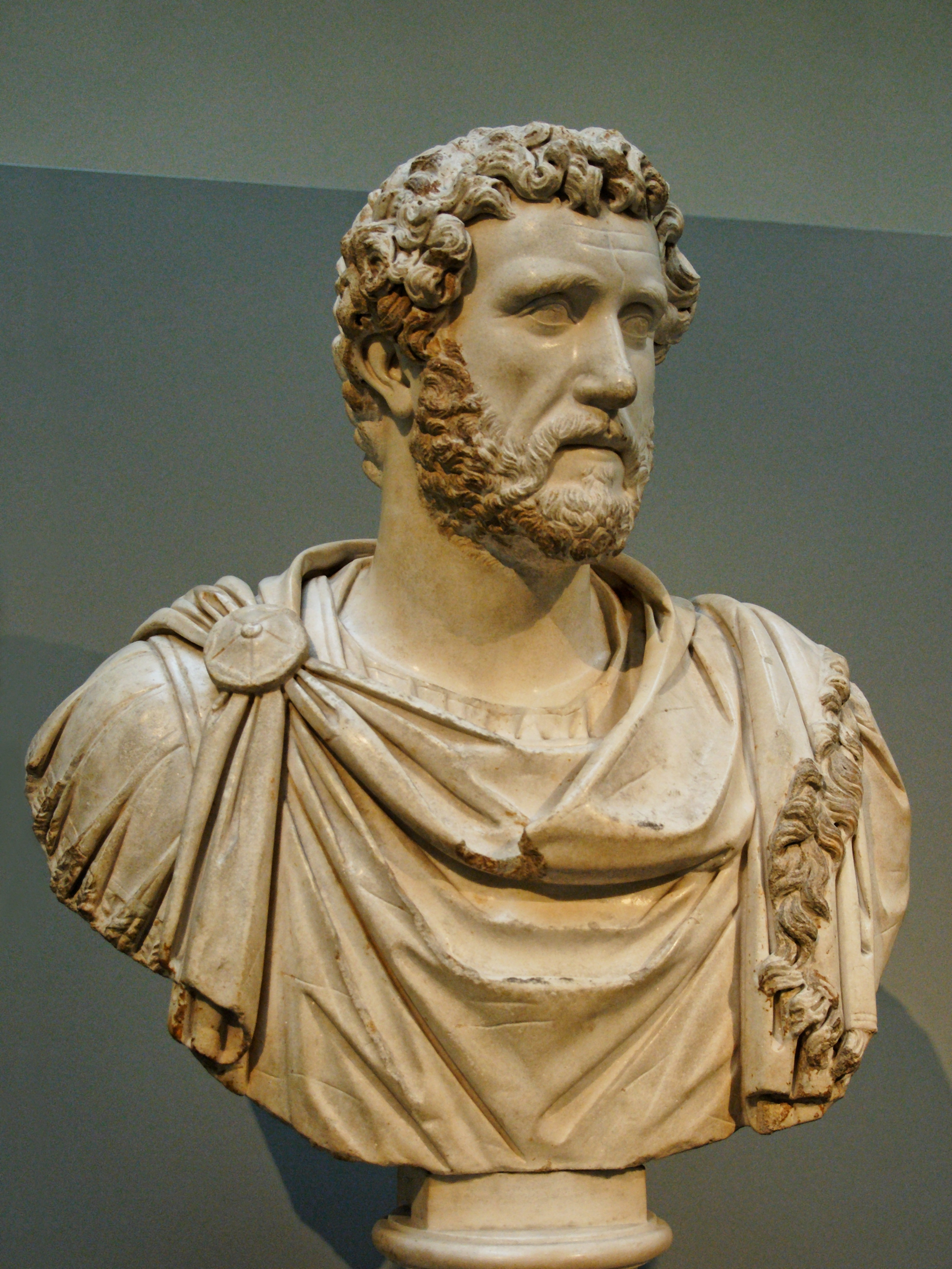
Bust of Antoninus Pius from the house of Jason Magnus at Cyrene, North Africa (British Museum).

Immediately after Hadrian's death, Pius approached Marcus and requested that his marriage arrangements be amended: Marcus' betrothal to Ceionia Fabia would be annulled, and he would be betrothed to Faustina, Pius' daughter, instead. Faustina's betrothal to Ceionia's brother Lucius Commodus would also have to be annulled. Marcus consented to Pius' proposal.

Pius bolstered Marcus' dignity: Marcus was made consul for 140, with Pius as his colleague, and was appointed as a seviri, one of the knights' six commanders, at the order's annual parade on 15 July 139. As the heir apparent, Marcus became princeps iuventutis, head of the equestrian order. He now took the name Caesar: Marcus Aelius Aurelius Verus Caesar. Marcus would later caution himself against taking the name too seriously: "See that you do not turn into a Caesar; do not be dipped into the purple dye—for that can happen". At the senate's request, Marcus joined all the priestly colleges (pontifices, augures, quindecimviri sacris faciundis, septemviri epulonum, etc.); direct evidence for membership, however, is available only for the Arval Brethren.

Pius demanded that Marcus take up residence in the House of Tiberius, the imperial palace on the Palatine. Pius also made him take up the habits of his new station, the aulicum fastigium or "pomp of the court", against Marcus' objections. Marcus would struggle to reconcile the life of the court with his philosophic yearnings. He told himself it was an attainable goal—"where life is possible, then it is possible to live the right life; life is possible in a palace, so it is possible to live the right life in a palace"—but he found it difficult nonetheless. He would criticize himself in the Meditations for "abusing court life" in front of company.

Marcus had much love and respect for his adoptive father. The tribute he gives Pius in the first book of the Meditations is the longest of any. He would have more influence on the young Marcus than any other person.

From my father: gentleness and unshaken resolution in judgments taken after full examination; no vainglory about external honours; love of work and perseverance; readiness to hear those who had anything to contribute to the public advantage; the desire to reward every man according to his desert without partiality; the experience that knew where to tighten the reign, where to relax. Prohibition of unnatural practices, social tact and permission to his suite not invariably to be present at his banquets nor to attend his progress from Rome, as a matter of obligation, and always to be found the same by those who had failed to attend him through engagements. Exact scrutiny in council and patience; not that he was avoiding investigation, satisfied with first impressions. An inclination to keep his friends, and nowhere fastidious or the victim of manias but his own master in everything, and his outward mien cheerful. His long foresight and ordering of the merest trifle without making scenes. The check-in his reign put upon organized applause and every form of lip-service; his unceasing watch over the needs of the empire and his stewardship of its resources; his patience under criticism by individuals of such conduct. No superstitious fear of divine powers nor with a man any courting of the public or obsequiousness or cultivation of popular favour, but temperance in all things and firmness; nowhere want of taste or search for novelty.

As quaestor, Marcus would have had little real administrative work to do. He would read imperial letters to the senate when Pius was absent and would do secretarial work for the senators. His duties as consul were more significant: one of two senior representatives of the senate, he would preside over meetings and take a major role in the body's administrative functions. He felt drowned in paperwork, and complained to his tutor, Fronto: "I am so out of breath from dictating nearly thirty letters". He was being "fitted for ruling the state", in the words of his biographer. He was required to make a speech to the assembled senators as well, making oratorical training essential for the job.

On 1 January 145, Marcus was made consul a second time. He might have been unwell at this time: a letter from Fronto that might have been sent at this time urges Marcus to have plenty of sleep "so that you may come into the Senate with good colour and read your speech with a strong voice". Marcus had complained of an illness in an earlier letter: "As far as my strength is concerned, I am beginning to get it back; and there is no trace of the pain in my chest. But that ulcer [...] (Note: The manuscript is corrupt here.) I am having treatment and taking care not to do anything that interferes with it." Marcus was never particularly healthy or strong. The Roman historian Cassius Dio, writing of his later years, praised him for behaving dutifully in spite of his various illnesses.

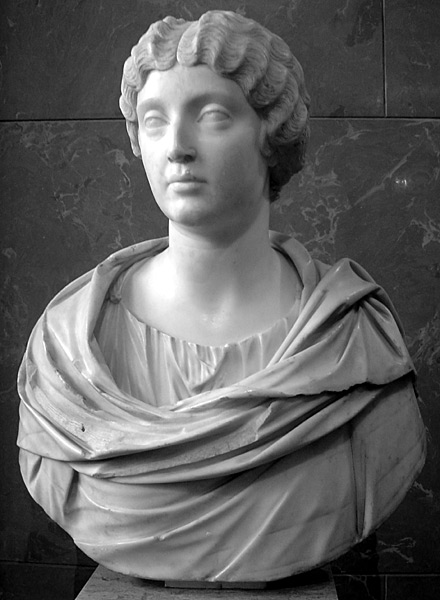
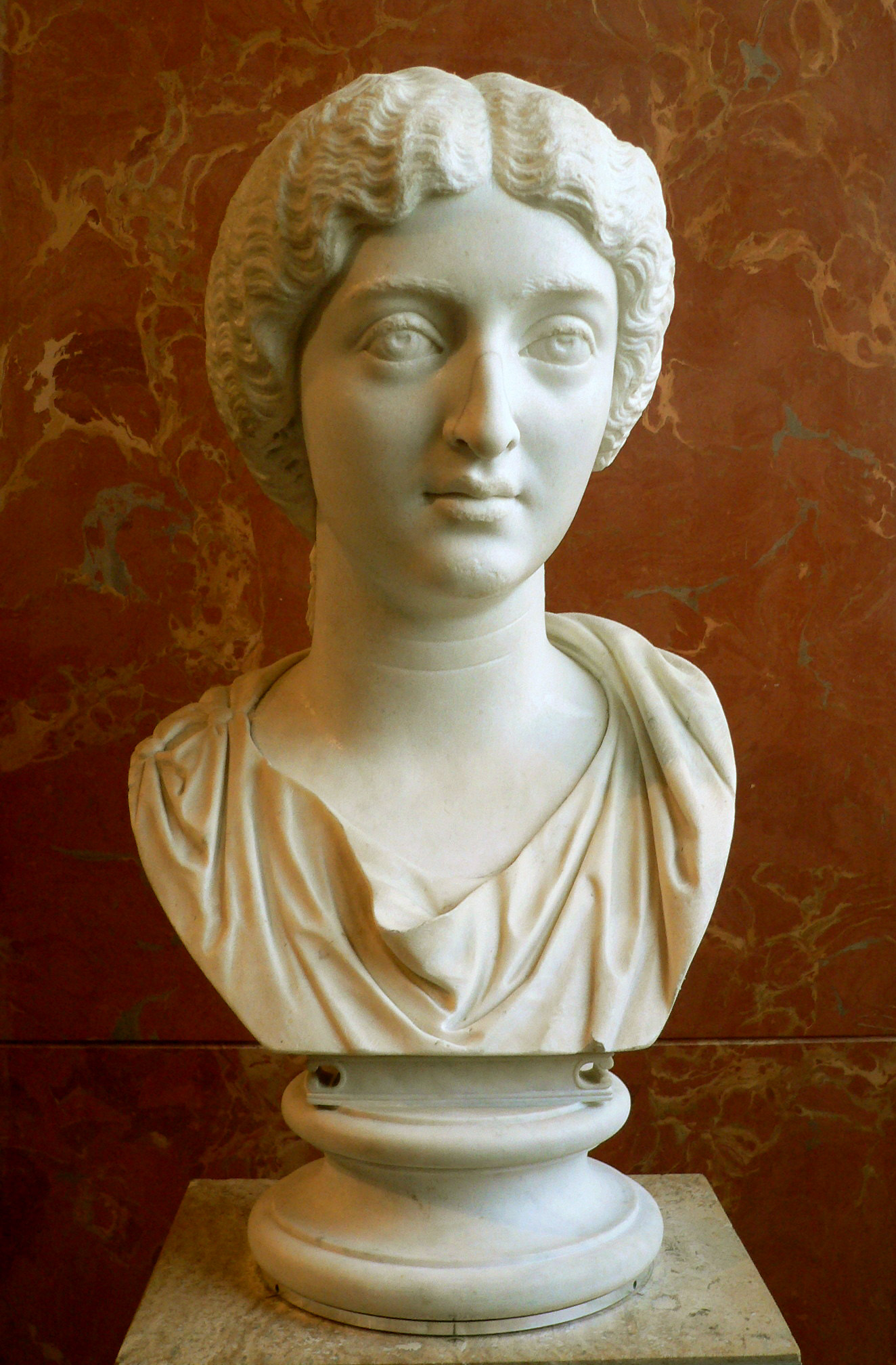
Busts of Faustina the Younger, Louvre, Paris

In April 145, Marcus married Faustina, as had been planned since 138. Since Marcus was, by adoption, Pius' son, under Roman law he was marrying his sister; Pius would have had to formally release one or the other from his paternal authority (his patria potestas) for the ceremony to take place. Little is specifically known of the ceremony, but it is said to have been "noteworthy". Coins were issued with the heads of the couple, and Pius, as Pontifex Maximus, would have officiated. Marcus makes no apparent reference to the marriage in his surviving letters, and only sparing references to Faustina.

== Fronto and further education, 136–146 ==
After taking the toga virilis in 136, Marcus probably began his training in oratory. He had three tutors in Greek, Aninus Macer, Caninius Celer, and Herodes Atticus, and one in Latin, Fronto. (Fronto and Atticus, however, probably did not become his tutors until his adoption by Antoninus in 138.) The preponderance of Greek tutors indicates the importance of the language to the aristocracy of Rome. This was the age of the Second Sophistic, a renaissance in Greek letters. Although educated in Rome, in his Meditations, Marcus would write his inmost thoughts in Greek. The latter two were the most esteemed orators of the day. Marcus' tutor in law was Lucius Volusius Maecianus, a knight Antoninus had taken on staff at his adoption by Hadrian, and the director of the public post (praefectus vehiculorum). Apollonius was compelled to return from Chalcedon to Rome at the request of Pius, and would continue teaching Marcus.

Herodes was controversial: an enormously rich Athenian (probably the richest man in the eastern half of the empire), he was quick to anger, and resented by his fellow-Athenians for his patronizing manner. He found oratory easy, and preferred subtle, metaphorical oratory to vigorous attack; "graceful" speech, to use the description of Philostratus, author of Lives of the Sophists. Atticus was an inveterate opponent of Stoicism and philosophic pretensions. He had once given a tramp calling himself a philosopher money to buy bread for a month, publicly declaiming men posing as philosophers all the while. He thought the Stoics' desire for apatheia foolish: they would live a "sluggish, enervated life", he said. Marcus would become a Stoic. He would not mention Herodes at all in his Meditations, in spite of the fact that they would come into contact many times over the following decades.

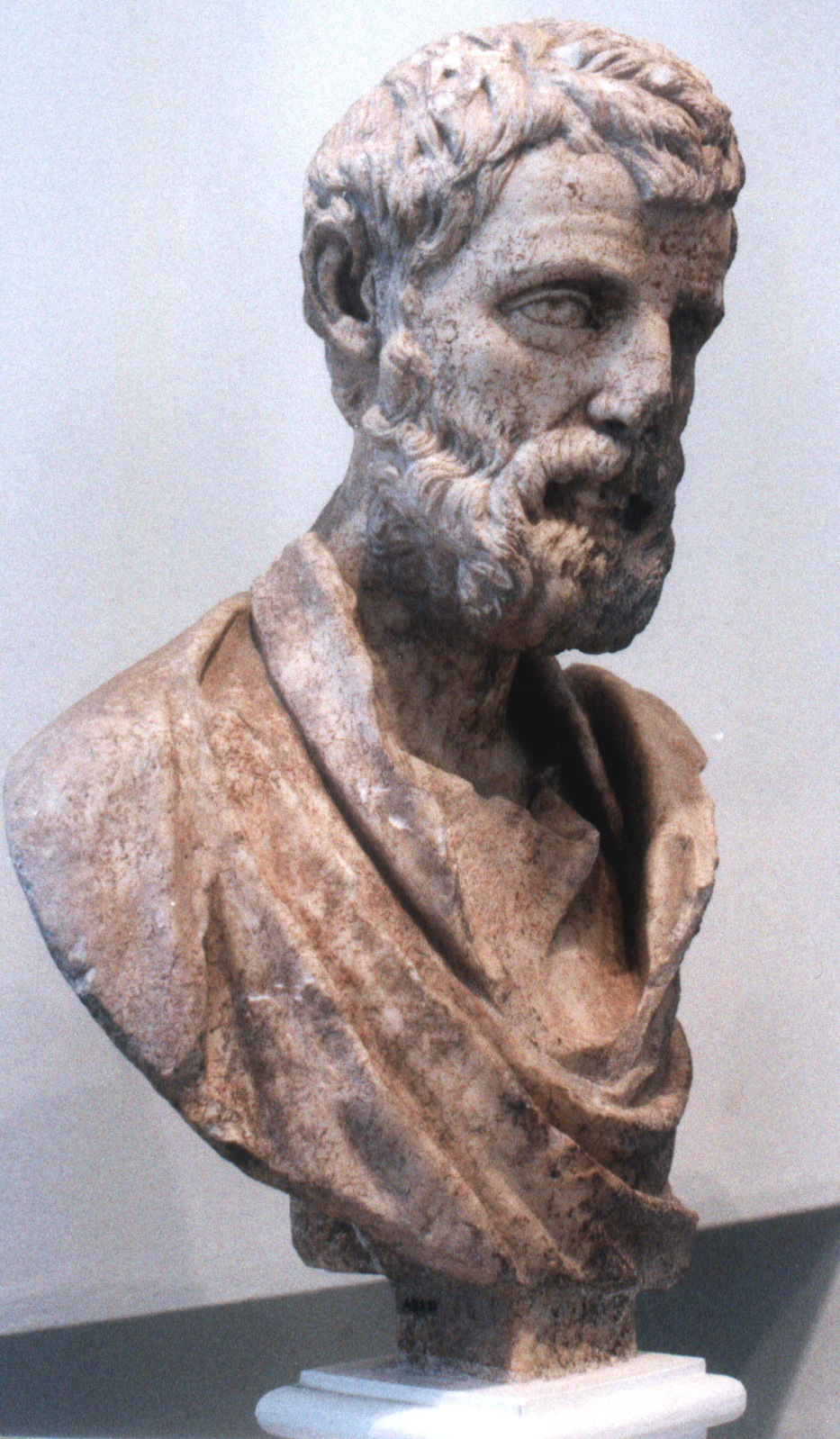
Bust of Herodes Atticus, Marcus' tutor in Greek, from his villa at Kephissia (National Archaeological Museum of Athens)

Fronto was highly esteemed: he was thought of as second only to Cicero, perhaps even an alternative to him. (Note: Moderns have not offered as positive an assessment. His second modern editor, Niebhur, thought him stupid and frivolous; his third editor, Naber, found him contemptible. Historians have seen him as a "pedant and a bore", his letters offering neither the running political analysis of a Cicero or the conscientious reportage of a Pliny. Recent prosopographic research has rehabilitated his reputation, though not by much.) He did not care much for Herodes, though Marcus was eventually to put the pair on speaking terms. Fronto exercised a complete mastery of Latin, capable of tracing expressions through the literature, producing obscure synonyms, and challenging minor improprieties in word choice. The Latin literary world of the day was self-consciously antiquarian: authors of the Silver Age—Seneca, Lucan, Martial, Juvenal, Pliny, Suetonius, and Tacitus—were ignored; only the greatest of the Golden Age, Virgil and Cicero, were widely read; only that pair and earlier writers, like Cato, Plautus, Terence, Gaius Gracchus, and (somewhat anachronistically) Sallust, were cited.

A significant amount of the correspondence between Fronto and Marcus has survived. The pair were very close, with some historians suggesting passionate feelings on Marcus's part. "Farewell my Fronto, wherever you are, my most sweet love and delight. How is it between you and me? I love you and you are not here." Marcus spent time with Fronto's wife and daughter, both named Cratia, and they enjoyed light conversation. He wrote Fronto a letter on his birthday, claiming to love him as he loved himself, and calling on the gods to ensure that every word he learned of literature, he would learn "from the lips of Fronto". His prayers for Fronto's health were more than conventional because Fronto was frequently ill; at times, he seems to be an almost constant invalid, always suffering—about one-quarter of the surviving letters deal with Fronto's sicknesses. Marcus asks that Fronto's pain be inflicted on himself, "of my own accord with every kind of discomfort".

Fronto never became Marcus' full-time teacher and continued his career as an advocate. One notorious case brought him into conflict with Herodes. Fronto had been retained as defense counsel by Tiberius Claudius Demostratus, a prominent Athenian. Herodes Atticus was chief prosecutor. Because of Herodes' fraught relationship with the city of Athens, the defense's strategy would probably include attacks on his character. Marcus pleaded with Fronto, first with "advice", then as a "favor", not to attack Herodes; he had already asked Herodes to refrain from making the first blows. Fronto replied that he was surprised to discover Marcus counted Herodes as a friend (perhaps Herodes was not yet Marcus' tutor), but allowed that Marcus might be correct, and agreed that the case should not be made into a spectacle. He nonetheless affirmed his intent to make use of the material available: "I warn you that I won't even use in a disproportionate way the opportunity that I have in my case, for the charges are frightful and must be spoken of as frightful. Those in particular which refer to the beating and robbing I will describe in such a way that they savour of gall and bile. If I happen to call him an uneducated little Greek it will not mean war to the death." Marcus was satisfied with Fronto's response.

The outcome of the trial is unknown, but Marcus succeeded in reconciling the two men. Soon after Fronto's tenure as consul suffectus in July and August 143, Marcus wrote a letter to him mentioning that Herodes' new-born son had recently died. Marcus asked Fronto to write Herodes a note of condolence. Fronto did, and part of the letter, written in Greek, survives. Fronto himself commended Marcus for his talents as a reconciler: "If anyone ever had power by his character to unite all his friends in mutual love for one another, you will surely accomplish this much more easily".

By the age of twenty-five (between April 146 and April 147), Marcus had grown disaffected with his studies in jurisprudence and showed some signs of general malaise. His master, he writes to Fronto, was an unpleasant blowhard, and had made "a hit at" him: "It is easy to sit yawning next to a judge, he says, but to be a judge is noble work." Marcus had grown tired of his exercises, of taking positions in imaginary debates. When he criticized the insincerity of conventional language, Fronto took to defend it. In any case, Marcus' formal education was now over. He had kept his teachers on good terms, following them devotedly. His biographer records that he "kept gold statues of them in his private chapel, and always honoured their tombs by personal visits". It "affected his health adversely", his biographer adds, to have devoted so much effort to his studies. It was the only thing the biographer could find fault in Marcus' entire boyhood.

== The Stoic prince, 146–161 ==
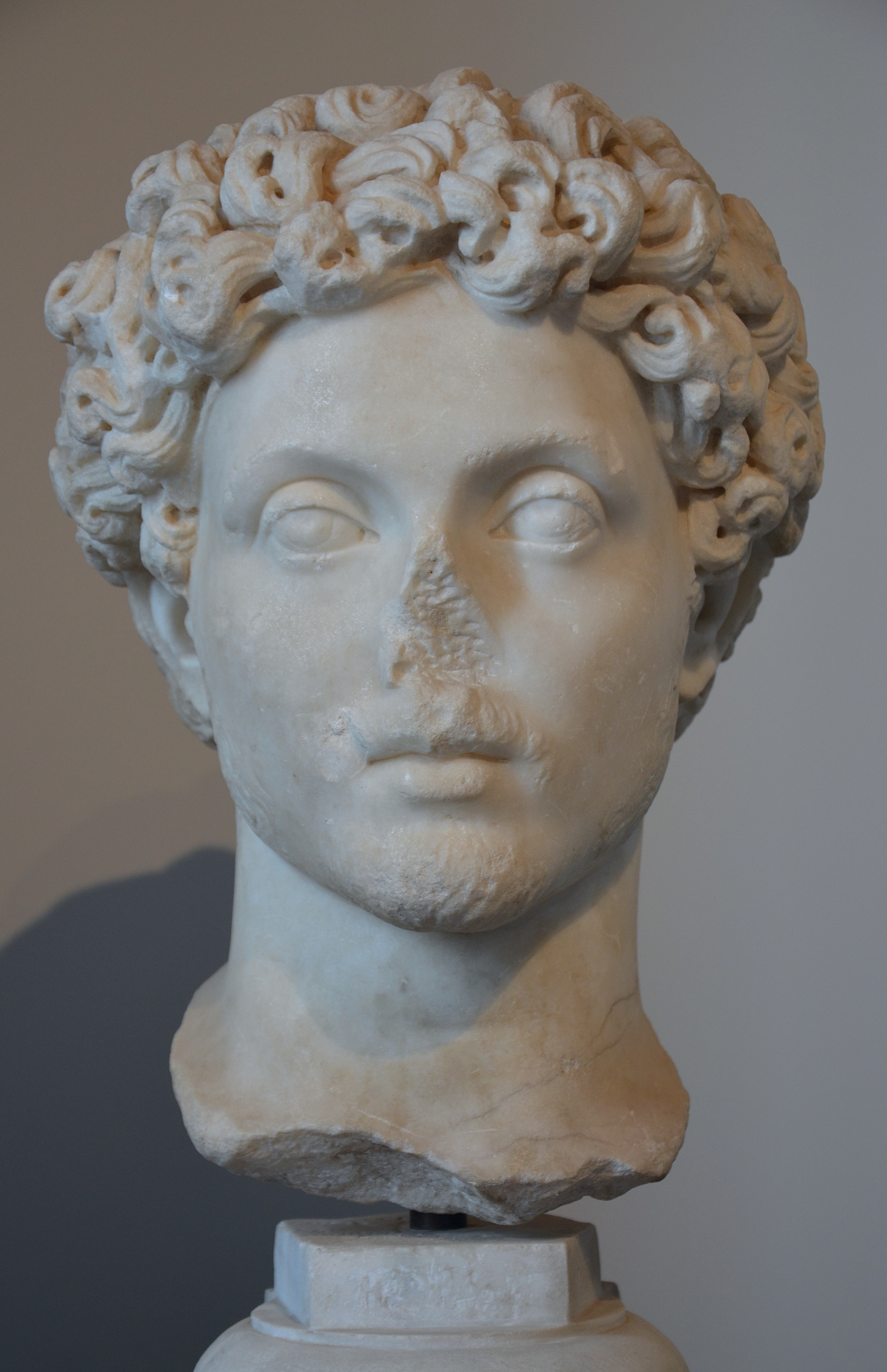
Portrait of Marcus as a young man, Antonine period (138–192 AD), from the area of San Teodoro on the Palatine Hill, Palatine Museum, Rome

Fronto had warned Marcus against the study of philosophy early on: "it is better never to have touched the teaching of philosophy...than to have tasted it superficially, with the edge of the lips, as the saying is". He disdained philosophy and philosophers, and looked down on Marcus' sessions with Apollonius of Chalcedon and others in this circle. Fronto put an uncharitable interpretation of Marcus' "conversion to philosophy": "in the fashion of the young, tired of boring work", Marcus had turned to philosophy to escape the constant exercises of oratorical training. Marcus kept in close touch with Fronto, but he would ignore his scruples.

Apollonius may have introduced Marcus to Stoic philosophy, but Quintus Junius Rusticus would have the strongest influence on Marcus. (Note: Champlin notes that Marcus' praise of him in the Meditations is out of order (he is praised immediately after Diognetus, who had introduced Marcus to philosophy), giving him special emphasis.) He was the man Fronto recognized as having "wooed Marcus away" from oratory. He was twenty years older than Marcus, older than Fronto. As the grandson of Arulenus Rusticus, one of the martyrs to the tyranny of Domitian (r. 81–96), he was heir to the tradition of "Stoic opposition" to the "bad emperors" of the first century; the true successor of Seneca (as opposed to Fronto, the false one). Marcus' tribute to him in the Meditations points to a move away from the oratorical training of Fronto. He thanks Rusticus for teaching him "not to be led astray into enthusiasm for rhetoric, for writing on speculative themes, for discoursing on moralizing texts...To avoid oratory, poetry, and 'fine writing'".

Claudius Severus, another friend, from a Greek family of Paphlagonia, gave Marcus an understanding of what these philosophers stood for. Severus was not a Stoic, but a Peripatetic (an Aristotelian); the strength of his influence illustrates the breadth of Marcus' philosophical horizons. Marcus thanks three other friends for their influence: Claudius Maximus, Sextus of Chaeronea, and Cinna Catulus. Maximus is one of Marcus' three most significant friends, alongside Apollonius and Rusticus. He taught Marcus "mastery of self" and "to be cheerful in all circumstances". Unlike Marcus' other friends, Sextus was a professional philosopher, devoted to teaching philosophy. Marcus continued to attend his lectures even after becoming emperor, scandalizing the polite classes of Rome. Catulus is totally unknown outside Marcus' brief words of praise in the Meditations and the notice in the Historia Augusta; Edward Champlin reckons him a senator.

== Births and deaths, 147–152 ==
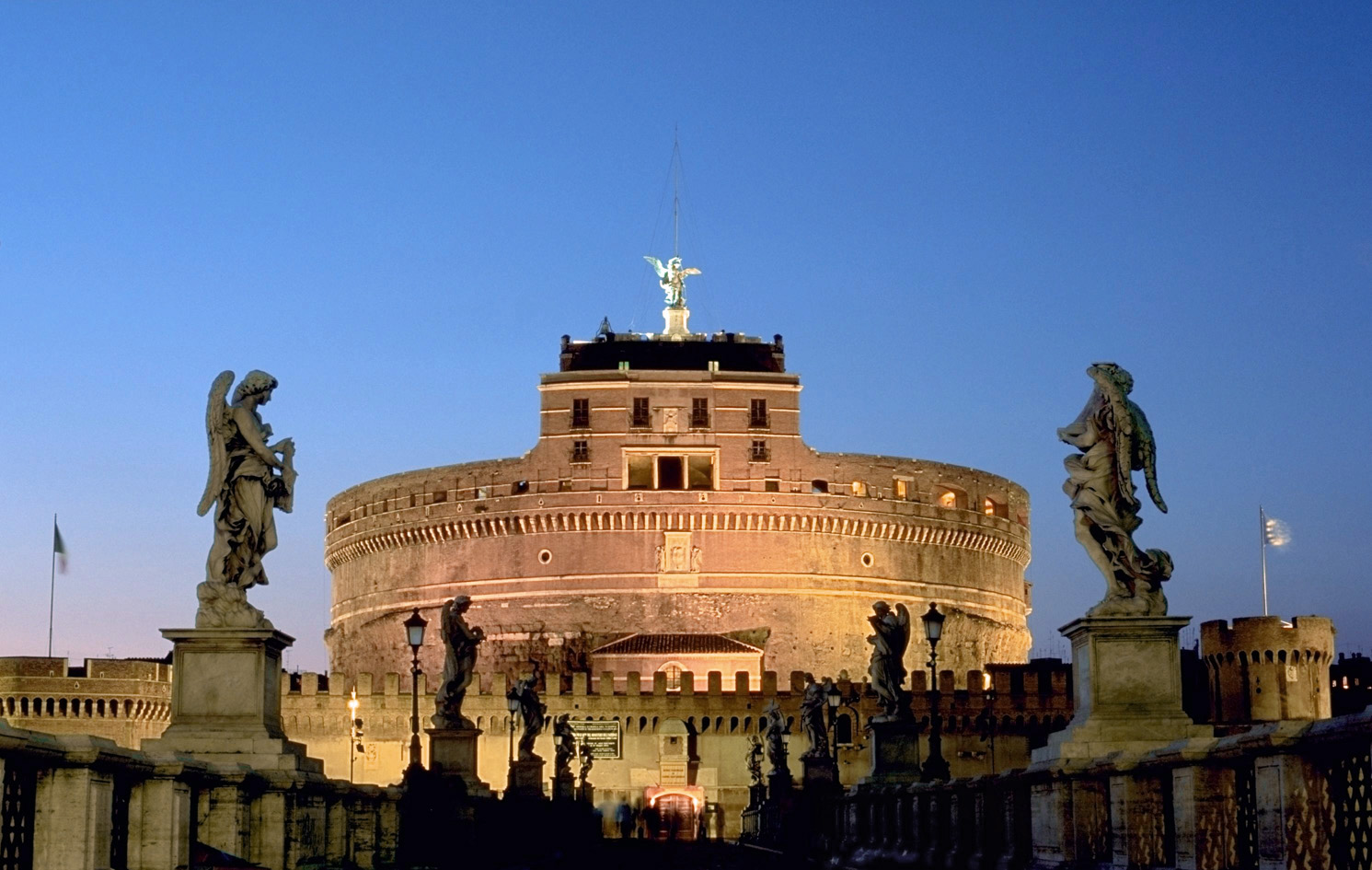
The Mausoleum of Hadrian, where the children of Marcus and Faustina were buried

On 30 November 147, Faustina gave birth to a girl, named Domitia Faustina. It was the first of at least fourteen children (including two sets of twins) she would bear over the next twenty-three years. The next day, 1 December, Pius gave Marcus the tribunician power and the imperium—authority over the armies and provinces of the emperor. As tribune, Marcus had the right to bring one measure before the senate after the four Pius could introduce. His tribunician powers would be renewed, with Pius', on 10 December 147.

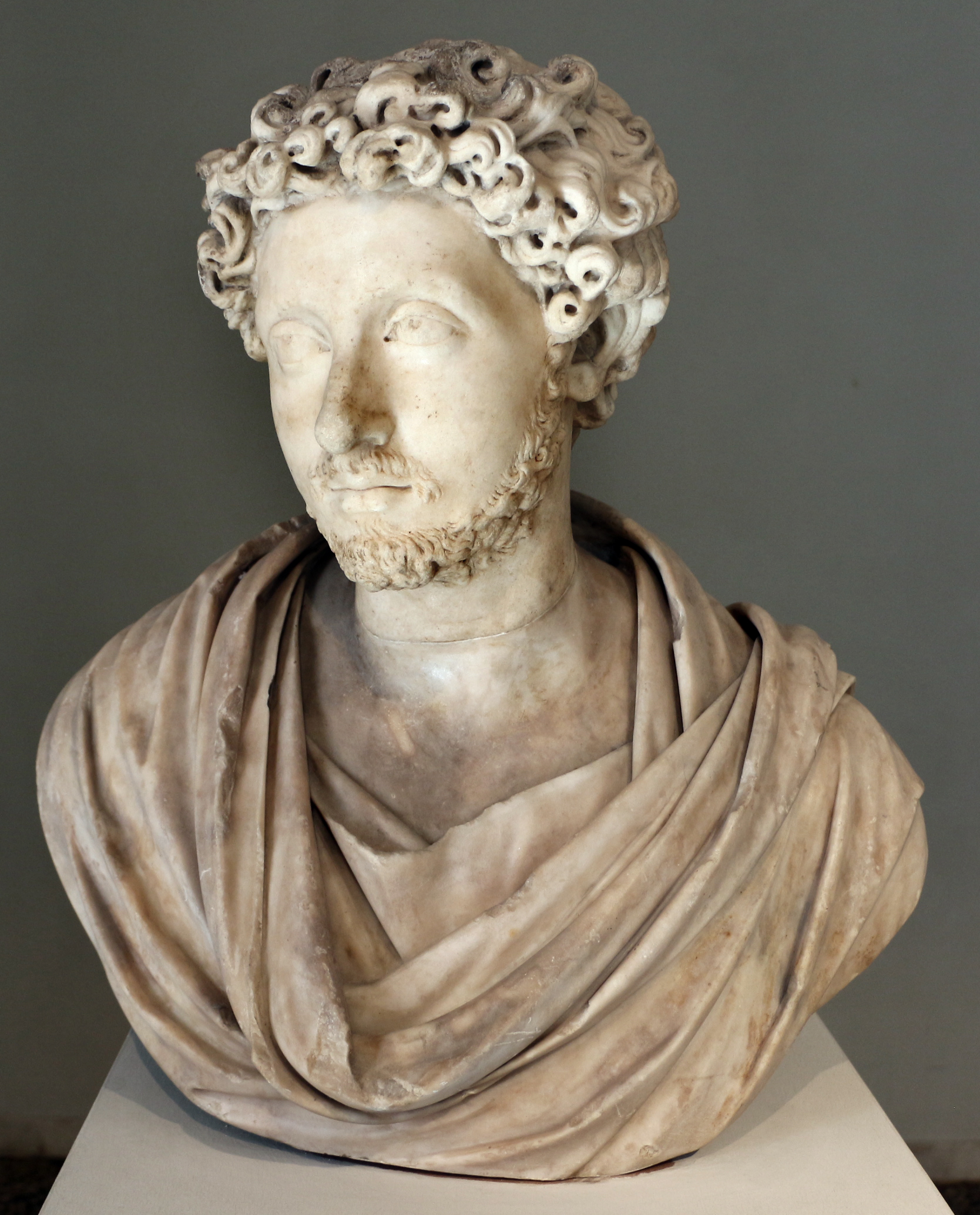
Bust of Marcus as a young man, c. 150 AD, Venice National Archaeological Museum

The first mention of Domitia in Marcus' letters reveals her as a sickly infant. "Caesar to Fronto. If the gods are willing we seem to have a hope of recovery. The diarrhoea has stopped, the little attacks of fever have been driven away. But the emaciation is still extreme and there is still quite a bit of coughing." Marcus wrote that he and Faustina had been "pretty occupied" with the girl's care. Domitia would die in 151.

In 149, Faustina gave birth again, to twin sons. Contemporary coinage commemorates the event, with crossed cornucopiae beneath portrait busts of the two small boys, and the legend temporum felicitas, "the happiness of the times". They did not survive long. Before the end of the year, another family coin was issued: it shows only a tiny girl, Domitia Faustina, and one baby boy. Then another: the girl alone. The infants were buried in the Mausoleum of Hadrian, where their epitaphs survive. They were called Titus Aurelius Antoninus and Tiberius Aelius Aurelius.

Marcus steadied himself: "One man prays: 'How I may not lose my little child', but you must pray: 'How I may not be afraid to lose him'." He quoted from the Iliad what he called the "briefest and most familiar saying...enough to dispel sorrow and fear":

leaves,
the wind scatters some on the face of the ground;
like unto them are the children of men.

– Iliad 6.146

Another daughter was born on 7 March 150, Annia Aurelia Galeria Lucilla. At some time between 155 and 161, probably soon after 155, Marcus' mother died. Faustina probably had another daughter in 151, but the child, Annia Galeria Aurelia Faustina, might not have been born until 153. Another son, Tiberius Aelius Antoninus, was born in 152. A coin issue celebrates fecunditati Augustae, "the Augusta's fertility", depicting two girls and an infant. The boy did not survive long; on coins from 156, only the two girls were depicted. He might have died in 152, the same year as Marcus' sister Cornificia.

A son was born in the late 150s. The synod of the temple of Dionysius at Smyrna sent Marcus a letter of congratulations. By 28 March 158, however, when Marcus replied, the child was dead. Marcus thanked the synod, "even though this turned out otherwise". The child's name is unknown. In 159 and 160, Faustina gave birth to daughters: Fadilla, after one of Faustina's dead sisters, and Cornificia, after Marcus' sister.

== Pius' last years, 152–161 ==
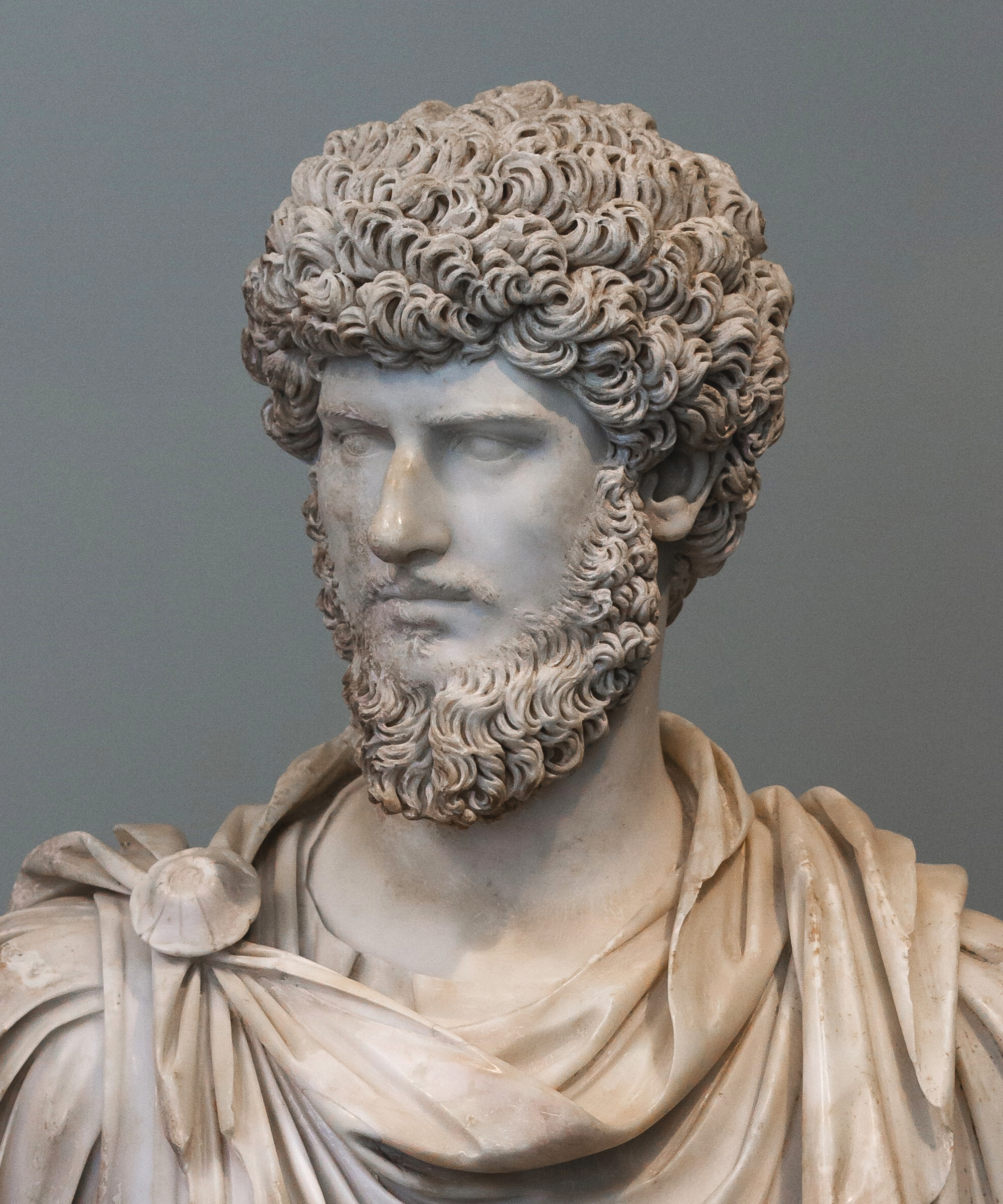
Bust of Lucius Verus, Marcus' adoptive brother and co-emperor (Metropolitan Museum of Art)

In 152, Lucius was named quaestor for 153, two years before the legal age of twenty-five (Marcus held the office at seventeen). In 154, he was consul, nine years before the legal age of thirty-two (Marcus held the office at eighteen and twenty-three). Lucius had no other titles, except that of "son of Augustus". Lucius had a markedly different personality than his brother: he enjoyed sports of all kinds, but especially hunting and wrestling; he took obvious pleasure in the circus-games and gladiatorial fights. (Note: Although part of the biographer's account of Lucius is fictionalized (probably to mimic Nero, whose birthday Lucius shared), and another part poorly compiled from a better biographical source, scholars have accepted these biographical details as accurate.) He did not marry until 164. Pius was not fond of Lucius' interests. He would keep Lucius in the family, but he was sure never to give the boy either power or glory. To take a typical example, Lucius would not appear on Alexandrian coinage until 160/1.

In 156, Pius turned seventy. He found difficult to keep himself upright without stays. He started nibbling on dry bread to give him the strength to stay awake through his morning receptions. As Pius aged, Marcus would have taken on more administrative duties, more still when the praetorian prefect (an office that was as much secretarial as military) Gavius Maximus died in 156 or 157. In 160, Marcus and Lucius were designated joint consuls for the following year. Perhaps Pius was already ill; in any case, he died before the year was out. Two days before his death, the biographer records, Pius was at his ancestral estate in Lorium. He ate Alpine cheese at dinner quite greedily. In the night he vomited; he had a fever the next day. The day after that, he summoned the imperial council, and passed the state and his daughter to Marcus. He ordered that the golden statue of Fortune, which had been in the bedroom of the emperors, should go to Marcus' bedroom. Pius turned over, as if going to sleep, and died. It was 7 March 161. Marcus was now emperor.

== Chronology ==
This table largely follows the chronology of Birley's Marcus Aurelius. The chronology of Fronto's letters and miscellaneous works largely follows Champlin's "The Chronology of Fronto" and his Fronto and Antonine Rome. A † indicates that a date is uncertain.

| Date | Event | Source |
|---|---|---|
| 121 | Verus (II) consul for the second time, prefect of Rome | |
| 26 April 121 | Marcus born in Rome | HA Marcus 1.5 |
| ca. 122 | Marcus' sister Cornificia born (Note: It is known that she was younger than Marcus, so she could not have been born before 122. Birley states that she was born "probably within the next two years" after Marcus' birth.) | |
| ca. 124 | Marcus' father Verus (III) dies during his praetorship | |
| 126 | Verus (II) consul for the third time | |
| 127 | Marcus enrolled in the equites | HA Marcus 4.1 |
| 128 | Marcus made salius Palatinus | HA Marcus 4.2 |
| 128 | Marcus begins his elementary education (Note: Absent positive evidence either way, Birley assumes that Marcus follows the typical schedule of a Roman aristocrat's education.) | e.g. Quintilian, Institutio Oratoria 1.1.15–16 |
| 132, after 26 April | Marcus introduced to "philosophy" by his painting-master Diognetus | HA Marcus 2.6, cf. Meditations 1.6 |
| 133 | Marcus begins his secondary education | |
| 136, ca. 17 March | Marcus takes the toga virilis | HA Marcus 4.5 |
| 136, after 26 April | Marcus betrothed to Ceionia Favia, daughter of L. Commodus | HA Marcus 4.5 |
| 136, after 26 April | Marcus is made prefect of the city during the feriae Latinae | HA Marcus 4.6 |
| 136 | Marcus meets Apollonius the Stoic | HA Marcus 2.7 |
| 136 | L. Commodus is adopted by Hadrian, becoming L. Aelius Caesar | HA Hadrian 23.11 |
| 136 | Cornificia marries Ummidius Quadratus† | HA Marcus 4.7, 7.4 |
| 136 | Hadrian compels his brother-in-law Servianus and Servianus' grandson Fuscus Salinator to commit suicide | HA Hadrian 15.8, 23.2–3, 23.8, 25.8; Dio 69.17.1–3 |
| 137 | L. Aelius Caesar stationed in Pannonia | HA Hadrian 23.13 |
| 1 January 138 | L. Aelius Caesar dies | HA Hadrian 23.16; HA Aelius 4.7 |
| 24 January 138 | Hadrian chooses Marcus' uncle T. Aurelius Antoninus as his successor | HA Hadrian 24.1, 26.6–10 |
| 25 February 138 | Antoninus accepts Hadrian's choice, and is adopted | HA Pius 4.6 |
| 25 February/26 April 138 (Note: HA Marcus 5.6 states that Marcus was not adopted until his seventeenth birthday (26 April). It is uncertain how much this account can be trusted.) | Antoninus adopts Marcus Aurelius and L. Commodus junior | Dio 69.21.1–2; HA Aelius 5.12, 6.9; HA Hadrian 24.1, 26.6–10; HA Marcus 5.1, (Note: HA Aelius 5.12 and Marcus 5.1 include the false report that Marcus adopted Lucius (he was adopted with Marcus, by Antoninus).) 5.5–6 |
| 25 February/26 April 138 | Faustina betrothed to L. Commodus junior | HA Aelius 6.9 |
| 25 February/26 April 138 | Marcus moves to Hadrian's residence in Rome | HA Marcus 5.3 |
| 25 February/26 April 138 | Marcus named quaestor for 139 | HA Marcus 5.6 |
| 25 February/26 April 138 | Antoninus named consul for 139 | HA Marcus 5.6 |
| 10 July 138 | Hadrian dies at Baiae and Antoninus accedes to the emperorship | HA Hadrian 26.6; HA Pius 5.1 |
| 10 July 138 | Marcus' betrothal to Ceionia Fabia and Lucius' betrothal to Faustina made void | |
| 138, after 10 July | Marcus betrothed to Faustina | HA Marcus 6.2; HA Verus 2.3 |
| 138, after 10 July | Hadrian deified | HA Hadrian 27.2; HA Pius 5.1 |
| 138, after 10 July | Antoninus named Pius | HA Hadrian 27.4, cf. HA Pius 2.2–7 (Note: The biographer relates a number of fictions regarding Antoninus assumed name in this passage.) |
| 139 | Pius consul | |
| 139 | Marcus quaestor | HA Marcus 5.6; HA Pius 6.9 |
| 139 | Marcus designated consul for 140 | HA Marcus 6.3; HA Pius 6.9 |
| 139 | Marcus acts as a sevir turmarum equitum Romanorum | HA Marcus 6.3 |
| 139 | Marcus becomes princeps iuventutis, takes the name Caesar, and joins the major priestly colleges | HA Marcus 6.3 |
| 139 | Marcus moves into Pius' palace | HA Marcus 6.3 |
| 139 | Marcus begins his higher education | |
| 140 | Marcus consul for the first time, with Pius | HA Marcus 6.4 |
| January 143 | Herodes Atticus, Marcus' tutor, consul | |
| July–August 143 | Fronto, Marcus' tutor, consul | Ad Marcum Caesarem, 2.9–12 |
| January 145 | Marcus consul for the second time, with Pius | |
| Late spring 145 | Marcus marries Faustina | HA Marcus 6.6; HA Pius 10.2 |
| 30 November 147 | Domitia Faustina is born to Faustina and Marcus (Note: Marcus and Faustina's first daughter has traditionally been identified with Annia Galeria Aurelia Faustina (against Herodian 1.8.3, which calls Annia Aurelia Galeria Lucilla as the eldest). Bol and Fittschen revised the chronology of Marcus and Faustina's children, and Domitia Faustina is now identified as the couple's first daughter.) | Inscriptiones Italiae 13.1.207; cf. HA Marcus 6.6, Herodian 1.8.3 |
| 1 December 147 | Marcus takes the tribunicia potestas | HA Marcus 6.6 |
| 1 December 147 | Faustina named Augusta | HA Marcus 6.6 |
| 149 | Twin sons are born to Faustina and Marcus; both die within the year | |
| 7 March 150 | Lucilla born to Faustina and Marcus | |
| 152 | Cornificia dies | Inscriptiones Italiae 13.1.207 |
| 152 | Lucius designated quaestor for 153 | |
| 152 | Tiberius Aelius Antoninus born† (Note: The Fasti Ostienses record the birth of a son in this year. He is identified with T. Aelius Antoninus by Bol and Fittschen.) | Inscriptiones Italiae 13.1.207 |
| 153 | Lucius quaestor | HA Pius 6.10, 10.3; HA Verus 2.11, 3.1–3 |
| 154 | Lucius consul | HA Pius 10.3; HA Verus 3.3 |
| 155 | Victorinus, son-in-law of Fronto and friend of Marcus, consul | |
| 155–161 | Domitia Lucilla Minor, Marcus' mother, dies | |
| 161 | Marcus consul for the third time, with Lucius | |
| 7 March 161 | Antoninus Pius dies | Dio 71.33.4–5; cf. HA Marcus 7.3; HA Pius 12.4–7 (Note: HA Pius 12.4 contains the false notice that Pius died in the seventieth year of his life; it was in fact the seventy-fifth.) |
| 8 March 161 | Marcus and Lucius become emperors | HA Marcus 7.3, 7.5; HA Verus 3.8 |

== Citations ==
All citations to the Historia Augusta are to individual biographies, and are marked with a "HA". Citations to the works of Fronto are cross-referenced to C.R. Haines' Loeb edition.

== Bibliography ==
=== Ancient sources ===
- Aelius Aristides. Orationes (Orations).
- Cassius Dio. Roman History.
  - Cary, Earnest, trans. Roman History. 9 vols. Loeb ed. London: Heinemann, 1914–27. Online at LacusCurtius. Accessed 26 August 2009.
- Epitome de Caesaribus.
  - Banchich, Thomas M., trans. A Booklet About the Style of Life and the Manners of the Imperatores. Canisius College Translated Texts 1. Buffalo, NY: Canisius College, 2009. Online at De Imperatoribus Romanis. Accessed 31 August 2009.
- Fronto, Marcus Cornelius.
  - Haines, Charles Reginald, trans. The Correspondence of Marcus Cornelius Fronto. 2 vols. Loeb ed. London: Heinemann, 1920. Online at the Internet Archive: Vol. 1, 2. Accessed 26 August 2009.
- Gellius, Aulus. Noctes Atticae (Attic Nights).
  - Rolfe, J.C., trans. The Attic Nights of Aulus Gellius. 3 vols. Loeb ed. London: Heinemann, 1927–28. Vols. 1 and 2 online at LacusCurtius. Accessed 26 August 2009.
- Herodian. Ab Excessu Divi Marci (History of the Roman Empire from the Death of Marcus Aurelius).
  - Echols, Edward C., trans. Herodian of Antioch's History of the Roman Empire. Berkeley and Los Angeles: University of California Press, 1961. Online at Tertullian and Livius Archived 2015-05-04 at the Wayback Machine. Accessed 14 September 2009.
- Marcus Aurelius Antoninus. Meditations.
  - Farquharson, A.S.L., trans. Meditations. New York: Knopf, 1946, rept. 1992.
- Quintilian. Institutio Oratoria (Institutes of Oratory).
  - Butler, H.E., trans. The Orator's Education. 5 vols. Loeb ed. London: Heinemann, 1920–22. Online at LacusCurtius. Accessed 14 September 2009.
- Scriptores Historiae Augustae (Authors of the Historia Augusta). Historia Augusta (Augustan History).
  - Magie, David, trans. Historia Augusta. 3 vols. Loeb ed. London: Heinemann, 1921–32. Online at LacusCurtius. Accessed 26 August 2009.
  - Birley, Anthony R., trans. Lives of the Later Caesars. London: Penguin, 1976.

=== Modern sources ===
- Barnes, Timothy D. "Hadrian and Lucius Verus." Journal of Roman Studies 57:1–2 (1967): 65–79.
- Birley, Anthony R. Marcus Aurelius: A Biography. New York: Routledge, 1966, rev. 1987. ISBN 0415171253
- Birley, Anthony R. "Hadrian to the Antonines." In The Cambridge Ancient History Volume XI: The High Empire, A.D. 70–192, edited by Alan Bowman, Peter Garnsey, and Dominic Rathbone, 132–194. New York: Cambridge University Press, 2000. ISBN 978-0521263351
- Champlin, Edward. "The Chronology of Fronto." Journal of Roman Studies 64 (1974): 136–159.
- Champlin, Edward. Fronto and Antonine Rome. Cambridge, MA: Harvard University Press, 1980. ISBN 0674326687
- McLynn, Frank. Marcus Aurelius: Warrior, Philosopher, Emperor. London: Bodley Head, 2009. ISBN 978-0224072922
- Robertson, D. How to Think Like a Roman Emperor: The Stoic Philosophy of Marcus Aurelius. New York: St. Martin's Press, 2019.
- Syme, Ronald. "The Ummidii." Historia 17:1 (1968): 72–105.
