= Trosius Aper =

2nd-century Roman grammarian

Trosius Aper was a grammarian of ancient Rome who served as one of two Latin tutors for the Roman emperor Marcus Aurelius, along with Tuticius Proculus. He was from Pola (modern Pula) in Istria, and was assigned to Aurelius as a tutor around 132 or 133 AD. As a tutor, Aper would have Aurelius read classical works out loud, and memorize them, later commenting on stylistic matters, and drawing philosophical lessons from the text for his pupil.

While it is known that Aper's colleague Tuticius Proculus was rewarded handsomely with a senatorship and consulship, little is known about the life of Aper.
