= Bibliography of works on Georges Méliès =

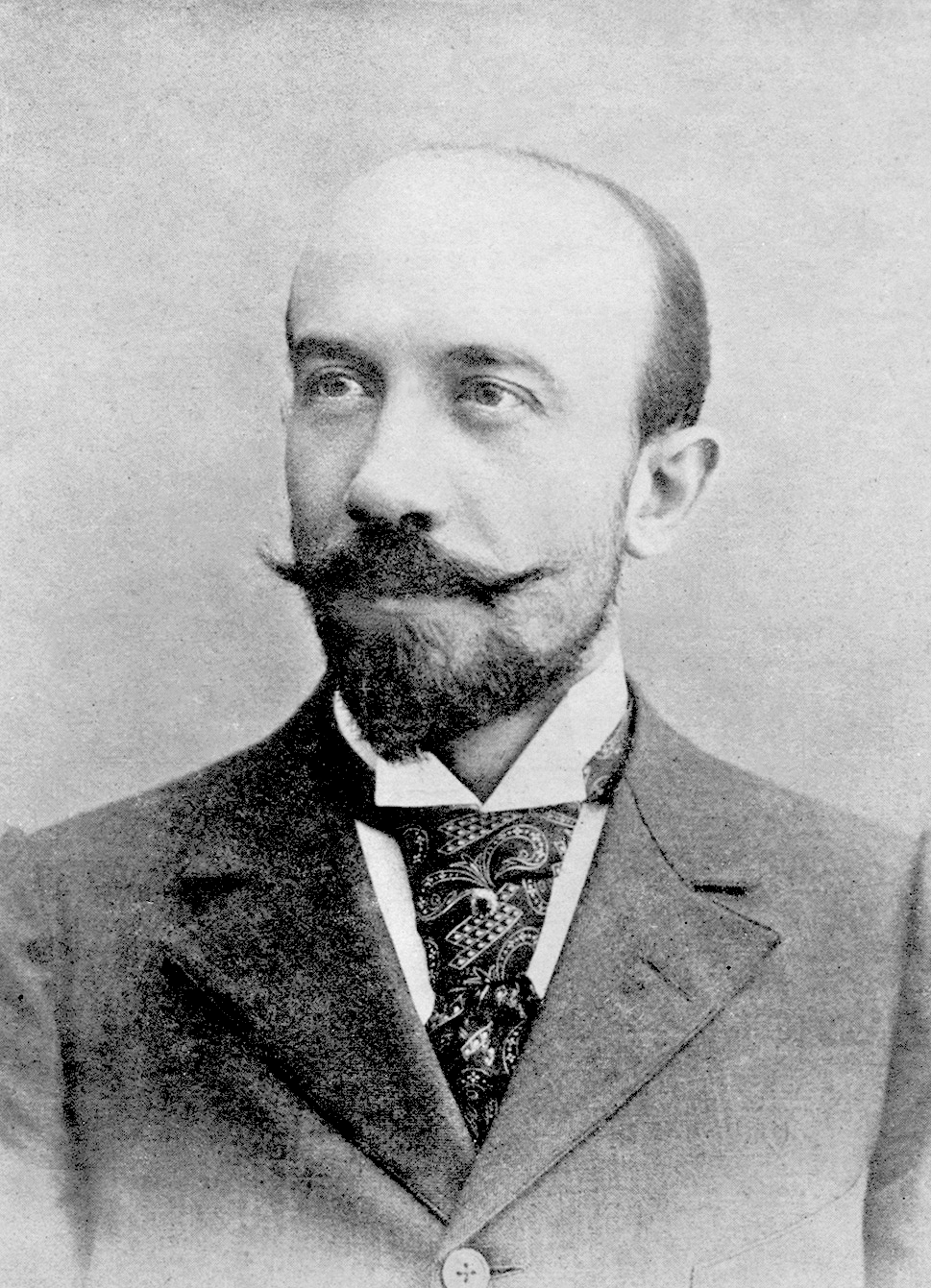
Méliès in 1895

The French filmmaker and magician Georges Méliès (1861–1938) is the subject of various written works, including biographies, essays, and monographs. The literature about him is abundant and spans many decades and languages, including English, French, Italian, Spanish, and German. Frank Kessler, a professor of media history, believes Méliès is arguably the most written about early filmmaker. Conversely, his name often appears in the titles of works not necessarily because his films are discussed but rather to signify the concept or time period of early cinema. Works in this bibliography have been reviewed in magazines or journals or are included in annotated bibliographies by Stéphane Tralongo or Elizabeth Ezra.

French film historians wrote pioneering, if constrained, works about Méliès between the 1940s and 1960s. Later, descendants of his and Anglosphere film historians wrote authoritative monographs and specialist works began to appear about his writings, magic, theater, film studios, film colorization, editing, and international reception. Conferences about Méliès held at the Centre culturel international de Cerisy-la-Salle suggest three phases in his scholarship. A conference in 1981 that studied his position in early cinema created debates between older and younger historians, such as Jean Mitry and André Gaudreault, respectively. A theoretical framework developed by Tom Gunning and Gaudreault, the "cinema of attractions", influenced a 1996 conference that studied the cultural contexts that shaped the motifs in his films. A conference in 2011 studied his attitudes toward an even wider array of contexts. Between these conferences, exhibition catalogs with materials related to the films, magic shows, paintings, and caricatures of Méliès have advanced his scholarship.

The descendants of Méliès are large contributors to his scholarship. His granddaughter Madeleine Malthête-Méliès, who grew up with him after her mother's death, began archiving his films and related materials in 1949. The archivist Henri Langlois of the Cinémathèque Française assisted her, and she founded the association Les Amis de Georges Méliès with her husband in 1961 to formalize the work. Her son Jacques Malthête expanded upon her work by cataloguing the films of Méliès across publications through the late 1970s and 1980s. From the 1980s onwards, Malthête-Méliès hosted or initiated the international conferences about Méliès that allowed scholars to refine their opinions of him. The publications of her son Malthête, daughter Anne-Marie Quévrain, and cousin Marie-Hélène Lehérissey in the bulletin of Les Amis de Georges Méliès have "inspired several generations of scholars", as Kessler writes.

== 1920s–1960s ==
- Noverre, Maurice (July 1929). "L'œuvre de Georges Méliès: Étude retrospective sur le premier " Studio cinématographique " machiné pour la prise de vues théâtrales" (PDF). Le Nouvel Art Cinématographique (in French). 2 (3): 64–85.
  An article written with the assistance of Méliès. Describes the construction, size, and evolution of his two film studios in Montreuil, as well as the equipment they kept. Argues he is the pioneer of "cinematic theatrical entertainment".
- Bessy, Maurice; Duca, Lo (1945). Georges Méliès, mage (in French). Prisma. OCLC 3444102.
  One of the earliest books about Méliès. Contains a biography, select plot summaries, an autobiographical text that Méliès wrote in the third-person, and many illustrations. As it was written when his filmography contained more gaps, it misidentifies some of his films.
- Sadoul, Georges (1961). Georges Méliès (in French). Seghers. OCLC 511758.
  A monograph that draws from many documents and oral accounts. Though an unavailability of sources required it take shortcuts, it is still considered a pioneering study. Reprints a selection of texts by Méliès, chosen alongside Pierre Lherminier. Reprinted in 1970.
- Exposition commémorative du centenaire de Georges Méliès (in French). Cinémathèque Française. 1961. OCLC 19397902.
  A catalog of Georges Méliès, an exhibition hosted June 7 – September 22, 1961, at the Musée des Arts Décoratifs, Paris, to celebrate the centennial of his birth. Contains an introduction by Henri Langlois and contributions from Jacques Deslandes and Madeleine Malthête-Méliès. Addresses the writings and drawings of Méliès.
- Deslandes, Jacques (1963). Le boulevard du cinéma à l'époque de Georges Méliès (in French). Éditions du Cerf. OCLC 4399368.
  A book that surveys Méliès and questions assumptions about him. Includes as an appendix a rare text about him from a program of the Théâtre Robert-Houdin. The professor Elizabeth Ezra believed that although later scholarship surpassed the book, it still generated useful information.

== 1970s ==
- Malthête-Méliès, Madeleine (1973). Méliès l'enchanteur (in French). Hachette. OCLC 757497597.
  A biography Malthête-Méliès began drafting in 1971, at first with her uncle André. Draws from her intense relationship with Méliès as well as archives of his work and contains some emphasis on his love life. Republished in 1995 by Ramsay and in 2011 as a revised edition.
- Hammond, Paul (1975). Marvellous Méliès. St. Martin's Press. ISBN 978-0-900406-39-3.
  The first English-language book about Méliès. Contains a biography, an analysis of the themes and production techniques in his films, an overview of the film career of his brother Gaston, and many illustrations, some from private collections. Argues that his stop trick influenced experimental film and that his personal life inspired his scenarios; the theme of innocent versus seductive women in his films was drawn from his first wife Eugénie Génin and mistress Jehanne d'Alcy. Challenges the traditional dichotomy between him and the Lumière brothers by arguing that he too filmed trains, beaches, and harbors.
- Kovács, Katherine Singer (Autumn 1976). "Georges Méliès and the Féerie". Cinema Journal. 16 (1): 1–13. doi:10.2307/1225446. JSTOR 1225446. S2CID 147288779.
  An article that contextualizes the films of Méliès within the history of the féerie, a French theatrical genre. Reprinted in 1983 as a chapter of Film Before Griffith, a book edited by John L. Fell.
- Frazer, John (1979). Artificially Arranged Scenes: The Films of Georges Méliès. G. K. Hall & Co. ISBN 978-0-8161-8368-5.
  A book divided into three parts: "The Artist's World", "The Career of Georges Méliès", and "The Films of Georges Méliès". Studies his films within their historical and artistic context. Includes much information about the content of his lost ones and detailed plot summaries and production notes concerning his surviving ones. In a review of the book, Jay Leyda commends Frazer's account of Star Film's downfall and states that he "is not distracted by the enormous difference between the quantity [of films] produced and the relatively few that remain". Ezra believed the book occasionally contained outdated information but was among the most useful about Méliès.

== 1980s ==
- Malthête, Jacques; Malthête-Méliès, Madeleine; Quévrain, Anne-Marie (1981). Essai de reconstitution du catalogue français de la Star-Film, suivi d'une analyse catalographique des films de Georges Méliès recensés en France (in French). Service des Archives du Film du Centre National de la Cinématographie. ISBN 978-2-903053-07-9.
  A reference book that was written by examining the films of Méliès through a Moviola. Consists of a filmography that recreates a Star Film catalog of French productions. Provides filming locations, detailed descriptions, and US and UK release titles, where applicable, of his surviving films.
- Usai, Paolo Cherchi (1983). Georges Méliès (in Italian). La Nuova Italia. OCLC 11599701.
  A book in a monographic series about filmmakers. Recites the themes and motifs in the films of Méliès. Republished in 2009 by Il Castoro.
- Malthête-Méliès, Madeleine, ed. (1984). Méliès et la naissance du spectacle cinématographique (in French). Klincksieck. ISBN 978-2-86563-077-6.
  Proceedings of an international conference of the same name supported by descendants of Méliès and hosted August 6–16, 1981, at the Centre culturel international de Cerisy-la-Salle (CCIC) to celebrate the twentieth anniversary of the association Les Amis de Georges Méliès. Each contribution focuses on a different aspect, and those by André Gaudreault, Pierre Jenn, Jacques Malthête, and Jean Mitry offer different opinions on film editing as it relates to Méliès. Malthête argues that the stop trick was not convincing enough on its own, so Méliès used editing techniques alongside it.
- Jenn, Pierre (1984). Georges Méliès cinéaste (in French). Editions Albatros. OCLC 12235390.
  A short book that uses two installments in the short film series The Dreyfus Affair to argue that Méliès was capable of using cinematic techniques rather than solely theatrical.
- Malthête, Jacques (1986). 158 scénarios de films disparus de Georges Méliès (in French). Les Amis de Georges Méliès. ISBN 978-2-9501491-0-7.
  A book that interprets lost Méliès films using descriptive texts from film catalogs, trade journals, and legal repositories. Assisted in identifying some of his lost films.
- Malthête, Jacques (1987). "Les bandes cinématographiques en couleurs artificielles. Un exemple: Les films de Georges Méliès coloriés à la main". 1895 (in French). 2: 3–10. doi:10.3406/1895.1987.880. S2CID 193997691.
  An article that studies the technical, economic, and aesthetic implications surrounding how women in Élisabeth and Berthe Thuillier's workshop colorized the films of Méliès. Argues that because it made each print distinct, the colorizing of his films imparted textual instability, as in how the formats of his film screenings and their live music varied.
- Gaudreault, André (Autumn 1987). "Theatricality, Narrativity, and Trickality: Reevaluating the Cinema of Georges Méliès". Journal of Popular Film & Television. 15 (3). Translated by Paul Attallah: 110–119. doi:10.1080/01956051.1987.9944092. S2CID 191342481.
  An essay that proposes a revisionist history of early cinema. Argues against a teleological view of film history in which the filmography of Méliès is categorized as either being theatrical or narrative and instead suggests a hybrid. Reprinted multiple times.
- Costa, Antonio (1989). La morale del giocattolo: Saggio su Georges Méliès (in Italian). Cooperativa Libraria Universitaria Editrice Bologna. OCLC 22005341.
  A reference book that surveys the films of Méliès and creates a theoretical framework to understand them.
- Gunning, Tom (Winter 1989). "'Primitive' Cinema: A Frame-up? or The Trick's on Us". Cinema Journal. 28 (2): 3–12. doi:10.2307/1225114. JSTOR 1225114. S2CID 147143038.
  An article that criticizes the term "primitive" as a descriptor for early cinema. Cites an editing style that Méliès used to compliment his fixed camera angle. Describes the dichotomy between him and the Lumière brothers. Reprinted in 1990 as a chapter of Early Cinema: Space, Frame, Narrative, a book edited by Thomas Elsaesser.

== 1990s ==
- Usai, Paolo Cherchi, ed. (1991). Lo schermo incantato: Georges Méliès (1861–1938) (in Italian and English). Giornate del Cinema Muto. OCLC 27187747.
  A catalogue of A Trip to the Movies: Georges Méliès, Filmmaker and Magician (1861–1938), an exhibition hosted June 29 – September 8, 1991, at the George Eastman House. Contains studies of Méliès, by Roland Cosandey and Yuri Tsivian, and a translation of a forum about him hosted by the Commission de recherche historique of the Cinémathèque Française. Tsivian describes the reception of his films and filmmaking style in Russia.
- Robinson, David (1993). Georges Méliès: Father of Film Fantasy. Museum of the Moving Image. ISBN 978-0-85170-415-9.
  A book that contains a brief overview of the life and work of Méliès as well as many illustrations.
- Malthête, Jacques (1996). Méliès, images et illusions (in French). Exporégie. ISBN 978-2-9504493-7-5.
  A book that reprints a few articles in the form of essays. Contains a biography of Méliès, detailed information about his filmmaking techniques, a filmography, his poems and drawings, and many colorized illustrations.
- Malthête, Jacques; Marie, Michel, eds. (1997). Georges Méliès, l'illusionniste fin de siècle? (in French). Presses de la Sorbonne Nouvelle. ISBN 978-2-87854-140-3.
  Proceedings of Georges Méliès et le deuxième siècle du cinéma, an international conference hosted August 13–22, 1996, at the CCIC to celebrate the centennial of cinema in France. Reanalyzes Méliès through the framework of "cinema of attractions", a concept developed by André Gaudreault and Tom Gunning. Contains a large bibliography of works about him selected by Frank Kessler and contributions about his rediscovery in later life or experimentation with the fourth wall. Ezra comments that many essays use his films "as little more than a pretext for discussing other subjects".

== 2000s ==
- Ezra, Elizabeth (2000). Georges Méliès: The Birth of the Auteur. Manchester University Press. ISBN 978-0-7190-5396-2.
  A monograph with a biography of Méliès and an analysis of the special effects, narrative strategies, and genres in his surviving films. Uses contemporary theory to argue that it is a myth that his films were mere childlike fantasies devoid of narrative structure. Analyzes the flying women in his films using feminist theory and finds that he satirized colonial expansion that resulted from an obsession with quicker modes of transportation. Robin Buss believes the book underplays his theatrical influences, though Victoria S. Steinberg and M. Yacowar were convinced of its thesis.
- Malthête, Jacques; Mannoni, Laurent, eds. (2002). Méliès, magie et cinéma (in French). Paris Musées. ISBN 978-2-87900-598-0.
  A catalog of an exhibition of the same name hosted April 26 – September 1, 2002, at the Espace EDF Electra, Paris, to celebrate the centennial of A Trip to the Moon. Summarizes what is known about Méliès and his films. Contains contributions that discuss how his films developed alongside the magic lantern, phantasmagoria, and Pepper's ghost, chronologize the construction of his film studios, and study how his trick effects worked and were received.
- Gaudreault, André (July 2007). "Méliès the Magician: The Magical Magic of the Magic Image". Early Popular Visual Culture. 5 (2). Translated by Timothy Barnard: 167–174. doi:10.1080/17460650701433822. S2CID 198574379.
  An article that studies the kinematography of Méliès using the discovery that he sometimes assembled different filmstrips. Describes his kinematography as adherent to the values and techniques of magic.
- Malthête, Jacques; Mannoni, Laurent, eds. (2008). L'œuvre de Georges Méliès (in French). Cinémathèque Française. ISBN 978-2-7324-3732-3.
  A catalog of Georges Méliès, magicien du cinéma, an exhibition hosted April 16 – August 2, 2008, at the Cinémathèque Française. Annotates documents or objects belonging to the Cinémathèque that are related to Méliès. Contains a filmography by Jacques Malthête, a revised version of previous ones, alongside a bibliography of published Méliès filmographies.

== 2010s ==
- Jacobson, Brian R. (May 2010). "The 'Imponderable Fluidity' of Modernity: Georges Méliès and the Architectural Origins of Cinema". Early Popular Visual Culture. 8 (2): 189–207. doi:10.1080/17460651003688089. S2CID 191645378.
  An article that places the studios of Méliès within the history of glass and steel architecture and studies how this architectural style influenced his filmmaking process. Brian R. Jacobson includes a revised edition of the article in his 2015 book Studios Before the System.
- Dupuy, Julien (2011). Georges Méliès: À la conquête du cinématographe (in French). StudioCanal. OCLC 800488874.
  A book that summarizes the literature about Méliès to provide an overview of him. Contains illustrations, is written in plain language, and is accompanied by three DVDs.
- Solomon, Matthew, ed. (2011). Fantastic Voyages of the Cinematic Imagination: Georges Méliès's Trip to the Moon. SUNY Press. ISBN 978-1-4384-3581-7.
  An anthology of essays, some reprinted, about A Trip to the Moon by 12 scholars. Each contribution provides a different interpretation, and many situate Méliès and the film within cultural contexts and inspirations, often turn of the century, such as Jules Verne, Jacques Offenbach, H. G. Wells, astronomy lectures by Albert Hopkins and Camille Flammarion, world's fairs, music halls, feminist intertextuality, the féerie genre, and the nature of point of view. Accompanied by a DVD of two versions of the film. Reviews commended the depth and quality of the contributions.
- Duval, Gilles; Wemaere, Séverine (2011). La couleur retrouvée du Voyage dans la Lune (PDF) (in French and English). Fondation Groupama Gan pour le Cinéma. OCLC 750668934. Archived from the original (PDF) on November 11, 2011.
  A book published to celebrate the restoration of a colorized Spanish print of A Trip to the Moon. Describes the history of the print and its restoration and contains some biographical material about Méliès.
- Tabet, Frédéric (Spring 2013). "Entre art magique et cinématographe: Un cas de circulation technique, le Théâtre Noir". 1895 (in French). 69: 26–43. doi:10.4000/1895.4608. S2CID 194158716.
  An article that studies obscure set designs to understand how Méliès used stage magic and black magic in his films, particularly via black backgrounds.
- Mannoni, Laurent, ed. (2013). Georges Méliès: La magia del cine (in Spanish). Fundación "la Caixa". ISBN 978-84-9900-079-4.
  A catalog of an exhibition of the same name hosted April 5 – June 24, 2013, at the CaixaForum Barcelona. Contains many texts by Mannoni. Rosa Cardona and Joan M. Minguet study the circulation and reception in Spain of the films of Méliès using documents concerning his sales agent from Barcelona. The catalog was also published in a Catalan edition.
- Costa, Antonio (2013). Viaggio sulla Luna: Voyage dans la Lune (Georges Méliès, 1902) seguito da l'automa di Scorsese e la moka di Kentridge (in Italian). Mimesis. ISBN 978-88-575-1624-0.
  A book in a series about Italian or French films from the silent era. Summarizes the cast, plot, and context of A Trip to the Moon before analyzing each scene and closing with relevant illustrations and a selected bibliography. Briefly addresses the presence of Méliès within contemporary art and how A Trip to the Moon relates to the study of the Moon in science fiction or optical illusions in popular culture.
- Malthête, Jacques (Winter 2013). "Un nitrate composite en couleurs: Le Voyage dans la Lune de Georges Méliès, reconstitué en 1929". 1895 (in French). 71: 163–181. doi:10.4000/1895.4784. S2CID 193206347.
  An article that examines a print of A Trip to the Moon lightly colorized for its screening at the Gala Méliès in 1929. Describes the negatives and positives stored in the Archives françaises du film that formed the sources of the print and how his films were colorized more broadly.
- Gaudreault, André; Le Forestier, Laurent; Tralongo, Stéphane, eds. (2014). Méliès, carrefour des attractions (in French). Presses Universitaires de Rennes. ISBN 978-2-7535-3394-3.
  Proceedings of an international conference hosted July 25 – August 1, 2011, at the CCIC to celebrate the 150th anniversary of the birth of Méliès. Contains 20 contributions, based largely on archival research, some of which view cinema as his extension of theater or discuss his magic lantern slide drawings, féerie films, film studio architecture, or innovations to cinema. Prints 200 of his French-language letters, most of his correspondence, which he wrote 1904–1937. Identifies the people and cultural references in his letters.
- Solomon, Matthew (May 2016). "Negotiating the Bounds of Transnational Cinema with Georges Méliès, 1896–1908". Early Popular Visual Culture. 14 (2): 155–167. doi:10.1080/17460654.2016.1162428. S2CID 147932857.
  An article that introduces Méliès as a proponent of transnational cinema and studies how he produced and distributed his films to appeal to audiences abroad, particularly after A Trip to the Moon was heavily pirated in North America.
- Cosandey, Roland; Malthête, Jacques (July 2018). "Les Vues cinématographiques de Georges Méliès (1907): Le texte et ses parages" (PDF). Miscellanées Méliès (in French). 2: 1–36. Archived from the original (PDF) on April 19, 2022.
  An article that details the publication history of Les vues cinématographiques, the best known text by Méliès. Starts with its publication in 1907 in Annuaire général et international de la photographie and ends with modern reprints and translations.

== 2020s ==
- Mannoni, Laurent (2020). Méliès: La magie du cinéma (in French). Flammarion. ISBN 978-2-08-152147-6.
  A book largely based on primary sources that provides an overview of Méliès. Contains many illustrations.
- Lecointe, Thierry; Fouché, Pascal; Byrne, Robert; Hutchinson, Pamela (2020). Discovering Lost Films of Georges Méliès in fin-de-siècle Flip Books (in French and English). John Libbey. ISBN 978-0-86196-750-6.
  A book that details how a flip book found in a German bookstore in 2013 was identified as a fragment of a lost Méliès film, resulting in the discovery of 19 more flip books by the manufacturer, a Parisian toy maker, also identified as fragments of his lost films. The first eight chapters in English are a loose translation of the more detailed final ten chapters in French, and between the two are illustrations of each flip book. Matthew Solomon questioned the book's methodology and stance on authorship, and within it Jacques Malthête questions the attribution of the films. Lies Lanckman and David Mayer found the book exciting.
- Solomon, Matthew (2022). Méliès Boots: Footwear and Film Manufacturing in Second Industrial Revolution Paris. University of Michigan Press. doi:10.3998/mpub.12196353. ISBN 978-0-472-90295-8. JSTOR 10.3998/mpub.12196353.
  A book that addresses the careers of Méliès in footwear, caricature, magic, filmmaking, musical theater, and toy retail. Focuses on his work in his family business as a footwear manufacturer and how it influenced his filmmaking alongside French cultural changes, like the Incoherents art movement, that resulted from the Second Industrial Revolution. Argues that the new technologies and craftsmanship he learned in footwear shaped his filmmaking. Contains 30 illustrations, many from private collections. Frank Kessler and W. D. Phillips commended its research and new perspective.
- Malthête-Méliès, Madeleine (2022). Solomon, Matthew (ed.). Magnificent Méliès: The Authorized Biography. Translated by Pero, Kel. University of Michigan Press. ISBN 978-0-472-13258-4.
  A book that translates the 2011 edition of Méliès l'enchanteur. Emphasizes his work at the Théâtre Robert-Houdin to argue it formed his filmmaking style. Suggests he was wealthy enough to sustain his passion for cinema, an unprestigious art form, and experiment with new techniques. Emphasizes his historical re-enactments. Contains illustrations from private collections, an introduction by Matthew Solomon, and an appendix by Anne-Marie Malthête-Quévrain. Christopher Small praised the book's detail but felt the personal involvement of the author limited the analysis of the legacy of Méliès. Kessler commended the translation footnotes.
