= Alison Sharrock =

English Classics scholar

- Born: Alison Ruth Sharrock; 4 January 1963 (age 63)

Academic background
- Education: University of Liverpool, University of Cambridge

Academic work
- Discipline: Classics
- Institutions: University of Manchester

Alison Ruth Sharrock (born 4 January 1963) is an English Classics scholar. She has been Professor of Classics at the University of Manchester since August 2000. In 2009, she gave the Stanford Memorial Lectures. Together with David Konstan of Brown University, she edits the series Oxford Studies in Classical Literature and Gender Theory published by Oxford University Press.

== Career ==
Alison Sharrock graduated in 1984 from the University of Liverpool with a Bachelor of Arts (BA) degree. She received her doctorate (PhD) from the University of Cambridge in 1988. She worked at Keele University from 1989 to 2000. During her current post as Professor of Classics at the University of Manchester, she was Head of the Division of Archaeology, Religions and Theology, Classics and Ancient History (ARC), and then Head of the Department of Classics, Ancient History, Archeology and Egyptology (CAHAE) in the School of Arts, Languages and Cultures. She specialises in Latin literature, particularly in feminist readings of comedy, elegy and epic. She also develops online support materials for teachers and learners of the Latin language.

== Selected publications ==
=== Books as single author ===
- Reading Roman Comedy: Poetics and Playfulness in Plautus and Terence (The Stanford Memorial Lectures, 2009); ISBN 978-1139482646
- Fifty Key Classical Authors (Routledge Key Guides) (with Rhiannon Ash, 2001); ISBN 978-0415165112
- Seduction and Repetition in Ovid's Ars Amatoria II (1994); ISBN 978-0198149590

=== Books as editor ===
- Lucretius: Poetry, Philosophy, Science (with Daryn Lehoux and A D Morrison, 2013); ISBN 978-0199605408
- The Art of Love: Bimillenial Essays on Ovid's Ars Amatoria and Remedia Amoris (with Roy K Gibson and Steven J Green, 2007); ISBN 978-0199277773
- Intratextuality: Greek and Roman Textual Relations (with Helen Morales, 2001); ISBN 978-0199240937

=== Contributions to books ===
- 'Gender and sexuality' in Cambridge Companion to Ovid (ed. Philip Hardie, 2002); ISBN 9780521775281
- 'Looking at looking: can you resist a reading?' in The Roman Gaze: Vision, Power, and the Body (ed. David Fredrick, 2002); ISBN 978-0801869617
- 'Re(ge)ndering gender(ed) studies' in Gender and the Body in the Ancient Mediterranean, Gender and History (ed Maria Wyke, 1998); ISBN 978-0631205241
- 'Warrior women in Roman epic' in Women and War in Antiquity (ed. Jacqueline Fabre-Serris and Alison Keith, 2015); ISBN 978-1421417622
- 'Channeled, Reformulated, and Controlled: Love Poetry from the Song of Songs to Aeneas and Dido' in 'Love and its Critics: From the Song of Songs to Shakespeare and Milton's Eden' (ed. Michael Bryson and Arpi Movsesian, 2017); ISBN 978-1-78374-350-6

=== Articles ===
- 'Womanufacture', Journal of Roman Studies 81, 1991, pp. 36–49.
- 'Ovid and the politics of reading', Materiali e discussioni per l'analisi dei testi classici 33, 1994, pp. 97–122.
- 'Genre and social class, or comedy and the rhetoric of self-aggrandisement' in Roman Drama and its Contexts (ed. Stavros Frangoulides, Stephen J Harrison and Gesine Manuwald, 2016); ISBN 978-3110455571

=== Miscellaneous ===
- Obituary of Don Fowler in The Guardian, 1999
