= Alessandro Barbero =

Italian historian and writer (born 1959)

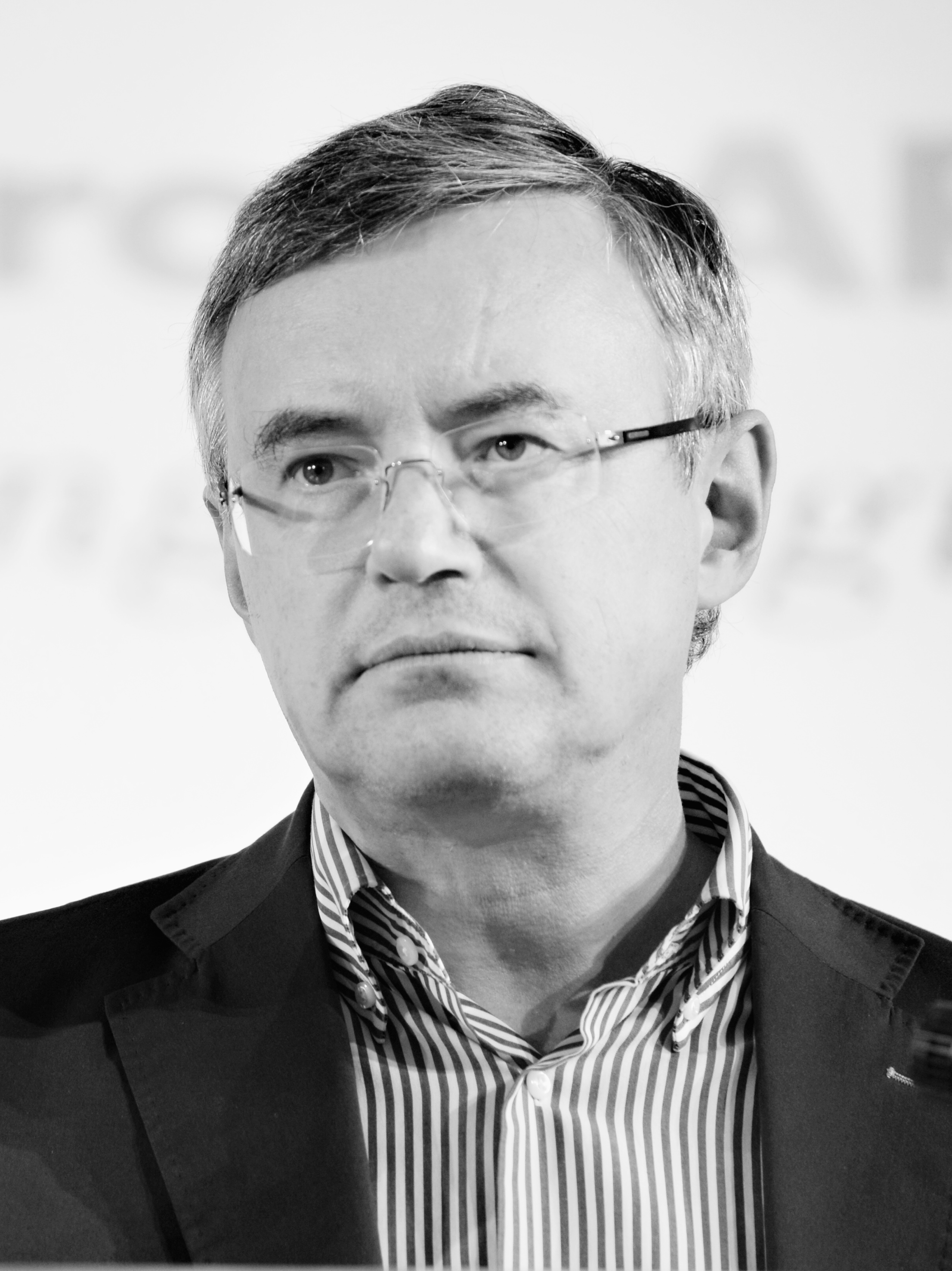
- Barbero in 2015
- Born: 30 April 1959 (age 67); Turin, Italy
- Awards: Strega Prize (1996); Chevalier of the Ordre des Arts et des Lettres (2005)

Academic background
- Education: University of Turin (1981)
- Alma mater: Scuola Normale Superiore di Pisa
- Academic advisor: Giovanni Tabacco

Academic work
- Discipline: Medieval, late antiquity, and military history
- Institutions: University of Eastern Piedmont (1998–2024); University of Rome Tor Vergata (1984–1998)

Alessandro Barbero (born 30 April 1959) is an Italian historian, writer and essayist.

Barbero was born in Turin, Italy. He attended the University of Turin, where he studied literature and medieval history. He has taught at the University of Eastern Piedmont in Vercelli since 1998, and held the chair of medieval history there as professore ordinario from 2002 to 2024. He won the 1996 Strega Prize, Italy's most distinguished literary award, for Bella vita e guerre altrui di Mr. Pyle gentiluomo. His second novel, Romanzo russo. Fiutando i futuri supplizi, has been translated into English as The Anonymous Novel. Sensing the Future Torments (Sulaisiadar 'san Rudha: Vagabond Voices, 2010).

Franco Cardini wrote in il Giornale, "Barbero uses the diabolic skills of an erudite and professional narrator to seek out massacres of the distant and recent past. The Anonymous Novel concerns the past-that-never-passes (whether Tsarist or Stalinist) and the future that in 1988 was impending and has now arrived." Allan Massie wrote in The Scotsman, "If you have any feeling for Russia or for the art of the novel, then read this one. You will find it an enriching experience", and Eric Hobsbawm wrote in The Observer, "The Anonymous Novel: Sensing the Future Torments, from a new publisher, Vagabond Voices, situated on the Isle of Lewis, is a vivid novel about Russians coping with the transition from communism to capitalism and combines echoes of Bulgakov with elements of a thriller."

Barbero is the author of The Battle, an account of the Battle of Waterloo, which has been translated into English. Other histories he has written which have been translated into English include The Day of the Barbarians, the story of the Battle of Adrianople, and Charlemagne: Father of a Continent.

Barbero is also a commentator and organiser on the Italian cultural scene: he is a member of the Management Committee of the Strega Prize and the Editorial Committee of the Storica magazine; he writes for the literary and cultural pages of Il Sole 24 Ore and La Stampa, and regularly appears on the television program Superquark and radio program Alle otto della sera. He is the editor of Storia d'Europa e del Mediterraneo, which is published by Salerno Editore.

In 2005, the Republic of France awarded Barbero with the title of "Chevalier of the Ordre des Arts et des Lettres". In the late 2010s, he acquired remarkable popularity on the Internet thanks to his many conferences uploaded on YouTube, and lessons with hundreds of thousands of views.

== Political positions ==
Barbero has stated many times that he is left-wing and a communist, and that he was a member of the Italian Communist Party in his youth.

During the 2021 Italian local elections, Barbero endorsed Angelo d'Orsi, candidate of a radical left coalition, in his race to be Turin's mayor.

Barbero sided against the European Parliament resolution of 19 September 2019 on the importance of European remembrance for the future of Europe, criticising the equivalence between communism and Nazism. He also considered "limited" the vision according to which communism would be identified "with Stalinism and with the regimes of the Warsaw Pact countries".

== Works ==
=== Essays ===
- Deputazione subalpina di storia patria, ed. (1983). Il mito angioino nella cultura italiana e provenzale fra Duecento e Trecento (in Italian). Torino.
- Cappelli, ed. (1987). L'aristocrazia nella società francese del Medioevo. Analisi delle fonti letterarie (secoli X-XIII) (in Italian). Bologna. – Collana Storia e Società, Roma-Bari, Laterza, 2021. ISBN 978-88-581-4527-2.
- Rosenberg & Sellier, ed. (1991). Un santo in famiglia. Vocazione religiosa e resistenze sociali nell'agiografia latina medievale (in Italian). Torino. ISBN 88-7011-433-3.
- Patron, ed. (1994). Amministrazione e giustizia nell'Italia del Nord fra Trecento e Settecento: casi di studio (in Italian). con Giovanni Tocci. Bologna.
- Laterza, ed. (1994). Dizionario del Medioevo. with Chiara Frugoni. Roma-Bari. ISBN 88-420-4495-4.
- Un'oligarchia urbana. Politica ed economia a Torino fra Tre e Quattrocento, Roma, Viella, 1995. ISBN 88-85669-37-9.
- La cavalleria medievale, Roma, Jouvence, 1999. ISBN 88-7801-306-4.
- Medioevo. Storia di voci, racconto di immagini, with Chiara Frugoni, Roma-Bari, Laterza, 1999. ISBN 88-420-5850-5.
- Carlo Magno. Un padre dell'Europa, Collana Storia e Società, Roma-Bari, Laterza, 2000. ISBN 88-420-6054-2.
- Valle d'Aosta medievale, Napoli, Liguori Editore, 2000. ISBN 88-207-3162-2.
- Benedette iene, in Francesco Antonioli (a cura di), La Bibbia dei non credenti. Protagonisti della vita italiana sfidano il Libro dei libri, Casale Monferrato, Piemme, 2002, pp. 124-127. ISBN 88-384-6504-5.
- Il ducato di Savoia. Amministrazione e corte di uno stato franco-italiano, 1416-1536, Collana Quadrante, Roma-Bari, Laterza, 2002. ISBN 88-420-6708-3.
- La guerra in Europa dal Rinascimento a Napoleone, Roma, Carocci, 2003. ISBN 88-430-2697-6.
- La battaglia. Storia di Waterloo, Collana I Robinson. Letture, Roma-Bari, Laterza, 2003. ISBN 88-420-6979-5 [tradotto in 6 lingue].
- Bonifacio VIII e la casa di Francia, in Bonifacio VIII. Atti del XXXIX Convegno storico internazionale. Todi, 13-16 ottobre 2002, Spoleto, Fondazione Centro italiano di studi sull'alto Medioevo, 2003. ISBN 88-7988-406-9.
- 9 agosto 378. Il giorno dei barbari, Collana I Robinson. Letture, Roma-Bari, Laterza, 2005. ISBN 88-420-7765-8.
- Barbari. Immigrati, profughi, deportati nell'impero romano, Collana Storia e Società, Roma-Bari, Laterza, 2006. ISBN 88-420-8082-9.
- Civiltà del tempo, fotografie di Pepi Merisio, Roma, Ecra, 2007. 978-88-6558-026-4.
- Terre d'acqua. I vercellesi all'epoca delle crociate, Roma-Bari, Laterza, 2007. ISBN 978-88-420-8330-6.
- Storia del Piemonte. Dalla preistoria alla globalizzazione, Torino, Einaudi, 2008. ISBN 978-88-06-18594-7.
- Benedette guerre. Crociate e jihad, Collana Saggi Tascabili, Roma-Bari, Laterza, 2009. ISBN 978-88-420-8987-2.
- Lepanto. La battaglia dei tre imperi, Collana I Robinson. Letture, Roma-Bari, Laterza, 2010. ISBN 978-88-420-8893-6.
- Il ronzino del vescovo. Una fonte notarile, Prima lezione di metodo storico, Roma-Bari, Laterza, 2010. ISBN 978-8842092209.
- Il divano di Istanbul, Collana Alle 8 della sera, Palermo, Sellerio, 2011. ISBN 88-389-2538-0.
- 29 maggio 1176. Barbarossa sconfitto a Legnano, Roma-Bari, Laterza, 2011, pubblicato in e-book.
- Dietro le quinte della storia. La vita quotidiana attraverso il tempo, con Piero Angela, Milano, Rizzoli, 2012. ISBN 978-88-17-06147-6.
- Capitolo I tre papi di san Francesco, in I volti del potere, Laterza, 2012. ISBN 978-88-420-9980-2.
- I prigionieri dei Savoia. La vera storia della congiura di Fenestrelle, Collana I Robinson. Letture, Roma-Bari, Laterza, 2012. ISBN 978-88-420-9566-8.
- Solimano il Magnifico, Roma-Bari, Laterza, 2012, pubblicato in e-book.
- Straniero. L'invasore, l'esule, l'altro, con Maurizio Bettini, Milano, Encyclomedia, 2012. ISBN 978-88-97514-29-9.
- 1289. La battaglia di Campaldino, Roma-Bari, Laterza, 2013, pubblicato in e-book.
- Donne, madonne, mercanti e cavalieri. Sei storie medievali, Collana I Robinson. Letture, Roma-Bari, Laterza, 2013. ISBN 978-88-581-0857-4.
- Costantino il Vincitore, Collezione Biblioteca Storica, Roma, Salerno Editore, 2016. ISBN 978-88-6973-138-9.
- Le parole del papa. Da Gregorio VII a Francesco, Collana I Robinson. Letture, Roma-Bari, Laterza, 2016. ISBN 978-88-581-2577-9.
- Federico il Grande, Collana Alle 8 della sera, Palermo, Sellerio, 2007, ISBN 88-389-2225-X; Collana La memoria, Sellerio, 2017. ISBN 978-88-389-3692-0.
- Quodlibet, ed. (2017). A che ora si mangia? Approssimazioni linguistiche all'orario dei pasti (secoli XVIII-XXI). Elements (in Italian). Macerata. ISBN 978-88-229-0046-3.
- Laterza, ed. (2017). "Napoleone e l'arte della guerra. A partire da Guerra e pace di Lev Tolstoj". Romanzi nel tempo. Come la letteratura racconta la storia (in Italian). Roma-Bari. ISBN 978-88-581-2916-6.
- Laterza, ed. (2017). Caporetto (in Italian) (Collana Cultura storica ed.). Roma-Bari. ISBN 978-88-581-2980-7.
- Laterza, ed. (2020). Dante (in Italian) (Collana I Robinson ed.). Roma-Bari. ISBN 978-88-581-4164-9.
- Giunti, ed. (2022). Inventare i libri. L'avventura di Filippo e Lucantonio Giunti, pionieri dell'editoria moderna (in Italian) (Collana I fondamenti ed.). Firenze. ISBN 978-88-098-6191-6.

==== Other contributions ====
- Einaudi, ed. (1985). "Storiografia di Corte del Quattrocento piemontese", in AA.VV., Piemonte medievale. Forme del potere e della società. Studi per Giovanni Tobacco (in Italian) (Collana Saggi ed.). Torino. ISBN 978-88-065-8248-7.

=== Narrative ===
- Mondadori, ed. (1995). Bella vita e guerre altrui di Mr. Pyle, gentiluomo (Collana Scrittori italiani e stranieri ed.). Milano. ISBN 88-04-40087-0. – Vincitore del Premio Strega 1996, tradotto in sette lingue.
- Mondadori, ed. (1998). Romanzo russo (Collana Scrittori italiani e stranieri ed.). Milano. ISBN 88-04-45063-0.
- Mondadori, ed. (2001). L'ultimo rosa di Lautrec (Collana Scrittori italiani e stranieri ed.). Milano. ISBN 978-88-044-8708-1.
- Mondadori, ed. (2003). Poeta al comando (Collana Scrittori italiani e stranieri ed.). Milano. ISBN 978-88-045-1215-8.
- Mondadori, ed. (2011). Gli occhi di Venezia (Collana Omnibus ed.). Milano. ISBN 978-88-04-59543-4. – Vincitore del "Premio Alessandro Manzoni – città di Lecco" 2011.
- Barbera, ed. (2012). New York, 14ª. Siena. ISBN 978-88-7899-559-8.
- Mondadori, ed. (2015). Le ateniesi (Collana Scrittori italiani e stranieri ed.). Milano. ISBN 978-88-04-65235-9.
- Sellerio, ed. (2021). Alabama (Collana La memoria ed.). Palermo. ISBN 978-88-389-4194-8.
- Sellerio, ed. (2023). Brick for Stone (Collana La memoria ed.). Palermo. ISBN 978-88-389-4466-6.

=== Translations ===
- Stephen Crane (1998). Frassinelli (ed.). Il segno rosso del coraggio (Collana I Classici Classici n.61 ed.). Milano. ISBN 978-88-768-4523-9. – con uno scritto di A. Barbero, Collana Oscar Classici n.663, Milano, Mondadori, 2012. ISBN 978-88-045-8590-9; Collana La memoria n.1219, Palermo, Sellerio, 2022. ISBN 978-88-389-4269-3.
- Mercurio, ed. (2009). La voglia dei cazzi e altri fabliaux medievali. Vercelli. ISBN 978-88-95522-32-6. – Vercelli, Effedì, 2020. ISBN 978-88-859-5062-7.
