= Don Paul =

Don Paul may refer to:

- Don Paul (linebacker) (1925–2014), former linebacker for the Los Angeles Rams
- Don Paul (defensive back) (1926–2001), former cornerback for the Chicago Cardinals and the Cleveland Browns
- Don Michael Paul (born 1963), actor, director, writer and producer
- Don Paul (animator), animator and co-director of The Road to El Dorado
- Don Paul Fowler (1953–1999), English classicist
- Don Paul (born 1936), musician with The Viscounts and later manager of other artists (e.g. Don Partridge)
- Don Paul, meteorologist, see WIVB-TV
