= Parcere subiectis et debellare superbos =

Parcere subiectis et debellare superbos is a Latin phrase which translates to "to spare the conquered and subdue the proud". It originates from Virgil's epic poem, the Aeneid in Book VI, line 853).

== Context ==
The phrase appears at the climax of the prophecy delivered by the shade of Anchises to his son Aeneas in the underworld (Book VI, lines 756–853). Drawing upon a poetic adaptation of Pythagorean metempsychosis (transmigration of souls), Virgil portrays the souls gathered along the banks of the river Lethe awaiting rebirth as future leaders destined to build and expand the power of Rome.

Anchises finishes his survey of Roman history by contrasting Rome's specific imperial mission with the achievements of other nations:

Excudent alii spirantia mollius aera,

credo equidem, vivos ducent de marmore voltus,
orabunt causas melius, caelique meatus
describent radio, et surgentia sidera dicent:
Tu regere imperio populos, Romane, memento:
hae tibi erunt artes, pacisque imponere morem,

parcere subiectis et debellare superbos.

— Virgil, Aeneid (VI.847–853)

In English:

Others, no doubt, will better mould the bronze

To the semblance of soft breath, draw from the marble
Living countenances, plead cases better, or trace
With a rod the courses of the sky and map the rising stars:
You, O Roman, remember to rule the peoples with your sway:
These shall be your arts—to impose the way of peace,

To spare the conquered and subdue the proud.

== Meaning ==
The phrase encapsulates Rome's seven-century rise from a settlement of huts on the seven hills of Rome into the capital of a Mediterranean empire, serving as a moral and ideological justification for Roman hegemony. At the time of composition, it also served as one summary of the aim of policies enacted under the newly established Principate under Augustus. Scholar Gian Biagio Conte summarized this phrase as being a two-sided injunction as containing two principles: the duty of vengeance and the necessity of forgiveness.

== Usage ==
As the Aeneid became part of Western education, the maxim became quoted, sometimes in full and sometimes by its first clause (parcere subiectis), to describe the ethics of power and governance:

- Early Christian poetry: In the late-antique poem Carmen de Iona propheta (traditionally attributed to Tertullian), the line is adapted to describe divine mercy toward the citizens of Nineveh:

Namque Ninivitum meritis mandarat Ionan

Prefari exitium dominus; sed conscius ille
Parcere subiectis et debita cedere poenae

Supplicibus, facilemque boni, cessabat obire...

— Carmen de Iona, lines 15–18

- Translation: "For the Lord had commanded Jonah because of the sins of the Ninevites to foretell their doom; but he, conscious that [the Lord] spares the humble and remits punishment due to suppliants... hesitated to go..."
- Italian literature: In Chapter XXIII of Alessandro Manzoni's 1827 novel I promessi sposi (The Betrothed), the character Don Abbondio silently appeals for clemency when asked by Cardinal Federico Borromeo to accompany the repentant Unnamed:

...con una sguardata pietosa che diceva: sono nelle vostre mani: abbiate misericordia: parcere subjectis.

— Alessandro Manzoni, The Betrothed

- Fascist architecture: During the Fascist period, the phrase was inscribed on a building in the newly constructed Piazza della Vittoria in Bolzano. The inscription was intended to connect the regime's urban remodeling and imperial ambitions to the historical power of ancient Rome and its mandate to rule.

== See also ==
- Aeneid
- Pax Romana
- List of Latin phrases
