= Jean-Pierre Néraudau =

French writer and professor

- Born: 30 January 1940; Algiers
- Died: 20 December 1998 (aged 58); Paris

Academic work
- Doctoral students: Jacqueline Fabre-Serris

Jean-Pierre Néraudau (30 January 1940 – 20 December 1998) was a 20th-century French writer and professor of Latin literature.

== Biography ==
The son of an officer in the French army, he studied in Dijon, where his family had settled in 1946. Agrégé of letters in 1964, he was named a high school teacher in Chartres where he remained until 1967.

Appointed a lecturer at the Sorbonne in 1968, he began a thesis on Roman youth during the Republican era, led by Jacques Heurgon. From 1974 to 1990 he was treasurer of the "Société des Études Latines".

He was a professor at Aix-en-Provence from 1979 to 1988 and then at the University of Reims, where he founded the association "Auspex" and the "Centre de Recherche sur les classicismes antiques et modernes" (with professor Georges Forestier), which became the "Centre de Recherche sur la Transmission des Modèles Littéraires et Esthétiques" after his departure. He was, among many others, Xavier Darcos's thesis director. He was then a professor at the University of Paris III: Sorbonne Nouvelle.

As a novelist, Jean-Pierre Néraudau published Les Louves du Palatin (Paris, Les Belles Lettres, 1981), Le Mystère du jardin romain (Les Belles Lettres, 1992) and Le Prince posthume.

== Publications ==
- 1978: L’Art romain, Que sais-je ?, Paris, Presses Universitaires de France
- 1979: La Jeunesse dans la littérature et les institutions de la Rome républicaine, Les Belles Lettres, ISBN 2-251-32826-2
- 1983: Urbanisme et Métamorphoses de la Rome antique, in collaboration with L. Duret, coll. Realia, Les Belles Lettres
- 1984: Être enfant à Rome, coll. Realia, Les Belles Lettres
- 1985: Dictionnaire d’histoire de l’art, Presses Universitaires de France
- 1985: Versailles, l’âme du parc, in collaboration with Jacques de Givry, Paris, les Éditions Sous le vent/Vilo
- 1986: L’Olympe du Roi-Soleil. Mythologie et idéologie royale au Grand Siècle, Les Belles Lettres.
- 1988: Les Louves du Palatin, Les Belles Lettres
- 1989: Ovide, ou les dissidences du poète, Paris, Les InterUniversitaires
- 1992: Le Mystère du jardin romain (detective novel), Les Belles Lettres, 1992.
- 1992: Edition présentée et annotée par Jean-Pierre Neraudau, translation by Georges Lafaye: Ovid, Les Métamorphoses, Éditions Gallimard, collection folio classique
- 1994: La Littérature latine, I, l’époque républicaine, Paris, Hachette, coll. les Fondamentaux
- 1996: Auguste, la brique et le marbre, Les Belles Lettres
- 2000: La Littérature latine, Paris, Hachette, coll. Langues et civilisations anciennes

Posthumous publications

- 1999: « La Poésie antique », in La Poésie, collective work under the direction of Y. Bellenger, Paris, Bréal, 11 to 47.
- March 2000 « Le Désir et les métamorphoses », in Carnets de Lille, Institut du champ freudien, 181 to 194.
- 1999: « Lettres d’amour, « Les Héroïdes » » d’Ovide, presentation and notes, Gallimard, Folio Classiques
- 2000: Le Prince posthume suivi de les Fils d’Arachné, Les Belles Lettres
