= Alison Keith =

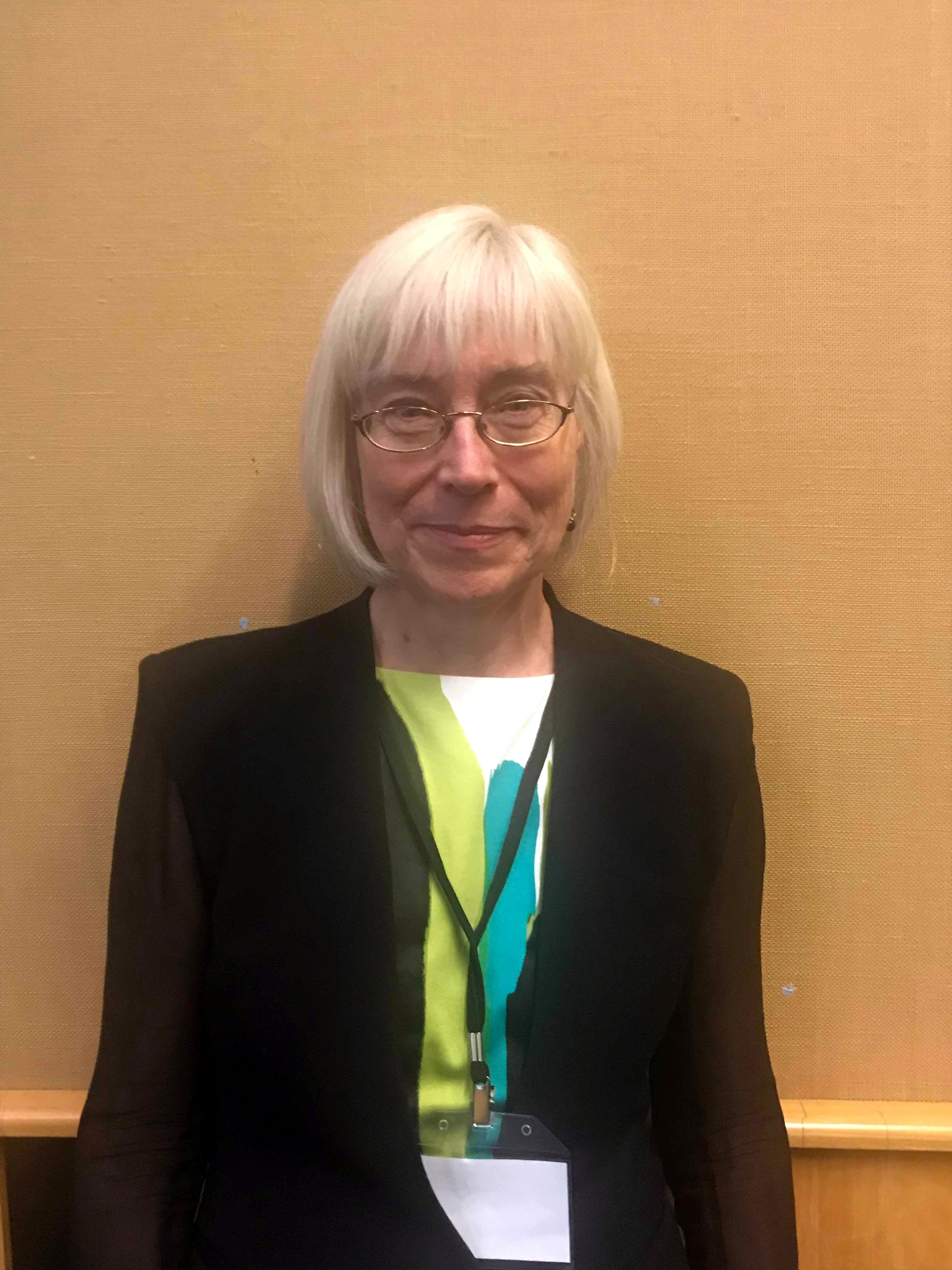
- Keith at the FIEC/CA Conference July 2019

Academic background
- Education: University of Alberta; University of Michigan
- Thesis: The Play of Fictions: Studies in Ovid, Metamorphoses 2.531-835 (1988)

Academic work
- Discipline: Classics
- Institutions: University of Toronto
- Notable works: Engendering Rome: Women in Latin Epic

Alison Mary Keith OC is a classical scholar who is Professor of Classics and Women's Studies at the University of Toronto, where she has been a Fellow of Victoria University of Toronto since 1989. She is an expert on the relationships between gender and genre in Latin literature, and has published widely on topics including Latin epic poetry, Ovid, Propertius, and Roman dress.

== Career ==
Alison Keith was educated at the University of Alberta, where she gained a BA in Classics. She then studied at the University of Michigan for her MA (gained in 1984) and PhD (in 1988). Her doctoral thesis was entitled The Play of Fictions: Studies in Ovid, Metamorphoses 2.531-835. She has taught at the University of Toronto since 1988, during which time she has also held research fellowships at institutions including Clare Hall, Cambridge (1994-1995), the University of Freiburg (1999-2000) and the National Humanities Center (2007-2008). She was selected as a research fellow of the Alexander von Humboldt Foundation in 1999, and in 2012 was elected as a Fellow of the Royal Society of Canada. From 2002 to 2007 she served as editor of Phoenix, Journal of the Classical Association of Canada, and from 2010 to 2012 was President of the Classical Association of Canada. In 2016 she received the Award of Merit from the Classical Association of Canada for her services to the study of the classical world in Canada and internationally. Since 2016 she has served on the board of directors of the Society for Classical Studies. In 2017 she won the Leadership Award from the Women's Classical Caucus of the Society for Classical Studies and was also appointed Director of the Jackman Humanities Institute at the University of Toronto. Keith is a key-note speaker at the Classical Association Conference 2019.

In 2026, she was named as an Officer of the Order of Canada. She lives in Toronto.

== Selected publications ==
- Sharrock, Alison and Alison Keith, eds. Maternal Conceptions in Classical Literature and Philosophy. Toronto, ON: University of Toronto Press, 2020
- Co-editor (with Jacqueline Fabre-Serris), Women and War in Antiquity. Baltimore: Johns Hopkins University Press, 2015.
- Guest Editor, Mouseion 11.3 (2014), In memoriam John William Geyssen.
- A Latin Epic Reader. Selections from Ten Epics. Mundelein, IL: Bolchazy-Carducci, 2012.
- Editor, Latin Elegy and Hellenistic Epigram. Cambridge: Cambridge Scholars Press, 2011.
- Propertius, Poet of Love and Leisure. Classical Literature & Society. London: Duckworth, 2008.
- Co-editor (with Jonathan C. Edmondson) Roman Dress and the Fabrics of Roman Culture. Toronto: University of Toronto Press, 2008.
- Co-editor (with Stephen Rupp) Metamorphosis: The Changing Face of Ovid in Medieval and Early Modern Europe. Toronto: Centre for Reformation and Renaissance Studies, 2007.
- Engendering Rome: Women in Latin Epic. Roman Literature and its Contexts. Cambridge: Cambridge University Press, 2000.
- The Play of Fictions: Studies in Ovid's Metamorphoses Book 2. Ann Arbor: University of Michigan Press, 1992.
