= La Cinémathèque Méliès =

Non-profit French organisation

La Cinémathèque Méliès – Les Amis de Georges Méliès
- Les Amis de Georges Méliès
- Formation: May 1961; 65 years ago
- Founder: Madeleine Malthête-Méliès, Dr René Malthête
- Type: Non-profit
- Registration no.: 61/570, now 61/0005701
- Purpose: Locate, gather, preserve and promote the work of Georges Méliès
- Headquarters: 11 rue de Belzunce, 75010 Paris
- Location: France
- Présidente: Mathilde Delamotte
- Secrétaire général: Anne-Marie Quévrain
- Website: cinemathequemelies.eu

The Cinémathèque Méliès – Les Amis de Georges Méliès is a French non-profit organisation (under French law "association loi de 1901") created in 1961 to locate, gather, preserve and promote the work of Georges Méliès and restore a French cultural heritage which, in 1945, was considered lost. The rediscovered work is promoted through lectures, "ciné-concerts" (cinema screenings with live music) as in the early days of cinema (explanation, musical accompaniment, movie projector), exhibitions, publications, a documentary and DVDs. So far, the association has managed to collect about 200 films, 145 of which were given to the Cinémathèque française.

== Creation ==
Illusionist Georges Méliès (1861–1938), director of the Théâtre Robert-Houdin, is a figure of the early days of cinema. Left penniless in 1923, Méliès destroyed all his films (about 520 made between 1896 and 1912). A big part of what was left of his work (drawings, production stills, magical objects, etc.) was stolen in 1940. Yet his films were distributed abroad. His main customers at the time were Travelling Showmen who toured the world with his films.

In May 1961, Georges Méliès's granddaughter, Madeleine Malthête-Méliès, and her husband Dr René Malthête, created an association called "Les Amis de Georges Méliès" ("Georges Méliès's Friends"), with the support of family members and of people who knew Méliès. It was officially registered as an association in the French "Journal Officiel" on 16 June 1961. On the same year, they all contributed to the exhibition held at the Cinémathèque française to celebrate the 100th anniversary of Georges Méliès's birth

== History ==
=== Before 1961 ===
In 1936, Henri Langlois, Georges Franju, Jean Mitry and Paul-Auguste Harlé created the Cinémathèque française. Méliès was likely to become honorary president. Only 9 of his films had been shown in France. From 1949 onwards, with the help of her husband and of the French Ministry of Foreign Affairs, Madeleine Malthête-Méliès started giving lectures abroad. Her first lecture took place in Sweden where Einar Lauritzen gave her The Witch (La Fée Carabosse ou le Poignard fatal), a hand-coloured film shot in 1906. This was how the film collection started. From the 1950s onwards, Georges's son André Méliès started giving lectures and film screenings like Madeleine.

As a screenwriter, film director, theatre director, production designer, film distributor, and camera operator, Méliès owned a vast number of movie rights. After his death, André Méliès and Madeleine Malthête-Méliès inherited his rights.

=== From 1961 to 2009: Locating, gathering and screening the lost films ===
The rights heirs decided that the royalties they received from screenings or exhibitions would be used to restore negatives prints, while positive copies would be screened by the association during shows with projectors running at 18 images per second, patter, accompaniment and sound-effects to recreate the atmosphere of the time. With screenings and exhibition rentals, the renewal of copies or exhibited photos could be paid by the association.

In March 1961, 113 members attended the first founding meeting. Actors (like Françoise Rosay, Noël-Noël, Pierre Blanchar), politicians (such as President Albert Sarraut, and minister Henri Ulver), cinema historians (Georges Sadoul), and institutions (international film libraries and the French Federation of Magic) were present. Filmmaker René Clair was the honorary president of the association registered with the Préfecture de Paris in 1961.

In late 1961, the association could project 18 film copies bought by Dr Malthête from the British Film Institute, Travelling Showmen, collectors, descendants of magicians, or coming from donations. 16 more were expected from international film libraries which the association had swapped copies with or bought copies from. As a private archive, the association was supported from the start by the F.I.A.F. (International Federation of Film Archives, founded in 1938). In 1961, the Malthête-Méliès represented France when they attended the F.I.A.F. Congress in Budapest, and then in Moscow in 1964 (many archives were already members of Les Amis de Georges Méliès). From 1964, the association remained an "Observer Member" of the F.I.A.F. until 1992, when this member status was cancelled. Due to solid and long-lasting relationships with film library directors, films were identified, retrieved and exchanged.

In 1962, as they were touring the US, Dr Malthête and Madeleine located 31 films by Méliès deposited as Paper print in the Library of Congress in Washington. In 1977, Leon Schlesinger's widow authorised Blackhawk Films to restore and copy some films: 49 were then added to the collection. In 1979, the Library of Congress (Washington) bought the whole Schlesinger's collection: Les Amis de Georges Méliès acquired 8 new films.

With those additions, the association put together a few programmes screened in Paris (at cinemas like Le Ranelagh, Le Seine, Studio 43, at Centre Georges Pompidou), in France and abroad. The accompanying pianists were Albert Lévy, Éric Le Guen and Jacques Pailhès.

In 1981 the association organised at Centre culturel international de Cerisy-la-Salle (CCIC), a colloquium dedicated to Georges Méliès (and led by Madeleine Malthête-Méliès), gathering enthusiasts and French and international historians. The association screened the whole collection of films – 140 – several times. Before the symposium and on request of the Archives françaises du film of the CNC, the association catalogued all data available about Georges Méliès's films in France in Analyse catalographique des films de Georges Méliès recensés en France. In addition to a thorough filmography put together by Jacques Malthête, this work examines each of the 140 films and locates their sources. A precious corpus of documents was then available to researchers.

In 1982, the association published a liaison bulletin deposited at the Bibliothèque Nationale de France (BNF).

In 1986, the association published 158 scénarios de films disparus de Georges Méliès by Jacques Malthête. It compiled 158 lost screenplays and enabled several researchers to identify films belonging to archives or collectors.

In 1988, "Cinémathèque Méliès" was added to the name of the association for Méliès's contemporaries had been dying. It is under this denomination that the association started gaining attention from the public.

In addition to her activities in France, Madeleine Malthête-Méliès carried on touring North and South America, Africa and Europe. From the 1990s onwards, Marie-Hélène Lehérissey (André Méliès's granddaughter) stood in for her and toured the Americas, Africa, Asia and Europe. Musicians Jacques Pailhès and Lawrence Lehérissey accompanied the screenings on piano.

In 1996, a second Méliès colloquium took place at CCIC (led by Jacques Malthête and Michel Marie). The association took this opportunity to publish a supplement to the 1981 catalogue record analysis called Analyse descriptive des films de Georges Méliès rassemblés entre 1981 et 1996 par la Cinémathèque Méliès (27 films). 167 films were then part of the collection. This symposium led to a collaborative project with Arte TV channel: a boxset containing a documentary by Jacques Mény and a musical screening of 15 films by Méliès with an introduction by Madeleine Malthête-Méliès and accompanied by pianist Éric Le Guen.

Later, 17 previously unreleased films were found at a French collector's place and 6 more at the Filmoteca de Cataluña ; others were found in surprising (headquarters of the French Communist Party) or unlikely places (New Zealand, Australia). In 2002, Cinémathèque Méliès was official partner of the exhibition organised by EDF and the Cinémathèque Française. The association gave about a hundred musical screenings at EDF Espace Electra and made a 25-minute documentary about the exhibition.

In 2008, the Cinémathèque Française organised an exhibition about Méliès and hosted Cinémathèque Méliès's ciné-concerts for over a year. On the same year, the association made 2 DVDs featuring 30 films (music by Lawrence Lehérissey), gathered in a box set produced by Fechner Productions and distributed by Studio Canal.

In 2009, 211 Méliès's films had been preserved. Some are available in various versions, which in terms of footage represents half his production. This is one of the best-preserved collections of works by a cinema pioneer.

=== After 2009 ===
Uncovering nitrate films in acceptable condition over a century after they were made is improbable. Archives all over the world have been working hand in hand, and the elements enabling the identification of a "Star Film" are well-known. Finding lost Méliès films has now become highly unlikely.

Méliès's films are copyright free in the United States and easily available on the Internet. In Europe (excluding Spain) his work has been in the public domain since January 2009 and therefore many musical screenings (ciné-concerts) have been organised all over the world.

In 2011, the Cinémathèque Méliès participated in the celebrations of the 150th anniversary of Méliès's birth. It organised and made a great contribution to a third colloquium at the CCIC in Cerisy-la-Salle: Méliès, carrefour des attractions (led by André Gaudreault and Laurent Le Forestier). The Cinémathèque Méliès decided to work with Studio-Canal again and gave them a batch of never before digitised films. A book was born from this collaboration: Georges Méliès à la conquête du cinématographe containing the 2 previously released DVDs and a third one featuring unreleased films (music by Lawrence Lehérissey). Last but not least, the Cinémathèque Méliès contributed to publish a revised edition of Madeleine Malthête-Méliès's Georges Méliès l'enchanteur.

In 2014, it became far too difficult for the Cinémathèque Méliès to preserve the films at the right temperature and humidity level. Therefore, the association gave the Cinémathèque Française 16 mm positive and negative elements (441 elements from 145 different films). But it has kept the ciné-concert programmes (some of which are digitalised) and many 35 mm elements.

== Publications by the association ==
- 1961: Georges Méliès, créateur du spectacle cinématographique (in French). Published with the assistance of the Montreuil Georges Méliès cinema club, the Tourist office and the City of Montreuil-sous-bois. It was republished in 1966 with the assistance of the Cultural Service of the French Ministry of Foreign Affairs. p. 20.
- 1982: The Cinémathèque Méliès started publishing a bi-annual bulletin deposited at the BNF ISSN 0758-539X. It was replaced in 2000 by a newsletter.
- 1985: Malthête-Méliès, Madeleine (1985). Méliès l'enchanteur (in French). biography republished with an enhanced filmography by Jacques Malthête. p. 467. ISBN 2-9501060-0-5.
- 1986: 158 scénarios de films disparus de Georges Méliès (in French). Association "Les Amis de Georges Méliès". 1986. ISBN 2-9501491-0-3.
- 1988: Méliès, Gaston; Malthête, Jacques (1988). Le voyage autour du monde de la G. Méliès Manufacturing Company, juillet 1912-mai 1913 (in French). Association "Les Amis de Georges Méliès". p. 143. ISBN 2-9-501-491-1-1.
- 1996 :
  - Malthête-Méliès, Madeleine; Combe, Jean-Paul (1996). "Analyse descriptive des films de Georges Méliès rassemblés entre 1981 et 1996 par la Cinémathèque Méliès". Cinémathèque Méliès (in French): 136. ISSN 0758-539X.
  - The Cinémathèque Méliès also keeps copies of Malthête, Jacques (1996). Méliès images et illusions (in French). Exporégie. p. 256. ISBN 2-9504493-7-9.

== Non-film collection and archives ==
The non-film collection belonging to Madeleine Malthête-Méliès — who bought most of the pieces with Dr René Malthête – was entrusted to the C.N.C. in 2004. The Cinémathèque Française now preserves this collection. It contains original drawings, productions stills, handwritten letters, costumes and objects.

The association also preserves the archives of activities and events it participated in from its creation, like letters from people and organisations who helped locating, gathering and bringing back to France a substantial part of Méliès's work.

== Organisation ==
Presidents and general secretaries:

President: Jacques Peyrou (1961–2005), Mathilde Delamotte (2006 – Now)

general secretary: Dr René Malthête (1961–1978), Anne-Marie Quévrain (1979 – Now)

Association Headquarters: 11 rue de Belzunce, 75010 Paris, France.
