= Jacques Heurgon =

- Born: 25 January 1903; Paris
- Died: 24 October 1995 (aged 92)
- Occupation: Historian
- Spouse: Anne Heurgon-Desjardins

Jacques Heurgon (25 January 1903 – 27 October 1995) was a French university, normalian, Etruscan scholar and Latinist. He was professor of Latin language and literature at the Sorbonne. A member of the École française de Rome (1928–1930), he was elected a member of the Académie des Inscriptions et Belles-Lettres in 1969.

== Personal life ==
Coming from a family of Parisian jewelers, Heurgon studied at the lycée Condorcet, where he met poet Jean Tardieu, with whom he would correspond for twenty years. Entered in the École normale supérieure in 1923, he was received at the first rank of the agrégation de lettres. In 1926, he married Anne Heurgon-Desjardins, the daughter of his former professor in khâgne, Paul Desjardins. Desjardins had organized at the abbaye de Pontigny the "Décades de Pontigny", literary meetings attended, among others, by André Gide, Bernard Groethuysen and Roger Martin du Gard. In 1952 his daughter in turn founded the Centre culturel international de Cerisy-la-Salle. Heurgon and Anne were the parents of Marc Heurgon, politician and historian, Catherine Peyrou, and Edith Heurgon who continued the "Colloques of Cerisy".

== Publications ==
- Recherches sur l'histoire, la religion et la civilisation de Capoue préromaine des origines à la deuxième guerre punique (« Bibliothèque des Écoles françaises d'Athènes et de Rome », 154), Paris, de Boccard, 1942, 483 p. (State thesis).
- Rome et la Méditerranée occidentale jusqu'aux guerres puniques, Nouvelle Clio, PUF, 3rd edition 1993 ISBN 2130457010
- La Vie quotidienne des Étrusques, Hachette, 1961 and 1989, 361 pages ISBN 9782010150746
- Le Trésor de Ténès, 86 pages, 1958, reprint Flammarion, 1992 ISBN 2082103943
- Le ciel a eu le temps de changer, correspondence 1922-1944 de Jacques Heurgon with Jean Tardieu, 272 pages, 2004, ISBN 2908295741
