= Helen Morales =

American classicist

Professor Helen Morales
- Born: Helen Louise Lakka; 17 May 1969 (age 57); Eastbourne, East Sussex, England

Academic background
- Education: Murray Edwards, University of Cambridge; Newnham College, University of Cambridge

Academic work
- Discipline: Classics
- Sub-discipline: Ancient Greek Literature; Greek Mythology
- Institutions: Murray Edwards, University of Cambridge; University of Reading; Arizona State University; Newnham College, University of Cambridge; University of California, Santa Barbara

Helen Louise Morales is a British-American classicist and the Argyropoulos Chair in Hellenic Studies at the University of California, Santa Barbara. She is best known for her scholarship on the ancient novel, gender and sexuality, and Greek mythology, as well for her public writing and lectures.

== Early life and education ==
Morales was born in Eastbourne in 1969 to a mother from Yorkshire and a father from Cyprus. She attended schools in Eastbourne and Brighton. Her maternal aunt was the British theatre director Annie Castledine.

Morales was the first in her family to get a university degree, graduating from New Hall (now Murray Edwards College), Cambridge with a BA Hons (first class) in Classics in 1990, and a PhD from Newnham College, Cambridge in 1997.

== Career ==
Morales took up her first lectureship at the University of Reading while she was in the second year of her PhD at Cambridge University.

In 1998–1999 she was a Fellow at the Center for Hellenic Studies in Washington, D.C., after which she taught for a year at Arizona State University.

She returned to Cambridge University as a lecturer, and then senior lecturer from 2001 to 2009. During this time, she was also a Fellow of Newnham College, working alongside Mary Beard. Beard later dedicated her 2017 book, Women & Power: A Manifesto to her.

In 2009 Morales moved to the University of California, Santa Barbara, where she was appointed the James and Sarah Argyropoulos Chair in Hellenic Studies.

Morales served as Chair of the Classics Department at UCSB for three years. During this time, it won the 2019 Professional Equity Award from the Women's Classical Caucus of the Society for Classical Studies.

In 2011 Morales was the Gail A. Burnett Lecturer at San Diego State University.

Morales gave the Martin Classical Lectures at Oberlin College in 2023.

Morales served as Interim Chair of the Music Department at UCSB from 2023 to 2024.

Morales established and is co-director of (with her colleague Emilio Capettini) UCSB's Center for the Study of Ancient Fiction.

In 2024 Morales was awarded an honorary doctorate from the Faculty of Languages at Uppsala University.

In 2025, Morales gave the J. H. Gray Lectures at the University of Cambridge.

Morales’ work has been cited, or she has been interviewed, in news outlets like The New York Times, The New Yorker, and The Guardian, and has appeared on BBC Radio 4.

== Research ==
Morales was co-editor of the Classics journal Ramus: Critical Studies in Greek and Roman Literature published by Cambridge University Press from 2006 to 2024.

She served on the editorial board of the open access online journal Eidolon, founded and edited by Donna Zuckerberg until its closure in 2020.

She serves on the editorial board of the Studia Graeca Upsaliensia book series.

Morales’ book Antigone Rising is one of New York Public Library's Essential Reads on Feminism for Adults.

Most of Morales’ research has focused on ancient Greek literature and mythology, but her interest in ancient pilgrimage led to a book on Dolly Parton and modern pilgrimage called Pilgrimage to Dollywood: A Country Music Road Trip Through Tennessee, published by University of Chicago Press. This was influential in the making of the award-winning podcast series Dolly Parton's America. The host, Jad Abumrad, called Morales "the original Dollyologist".

In 2022 Morales was lead curator of an exhibition of paintings by the artist Harmonia Rosales called Harmonia Rosales: Entwined, at UCSB's Art, Design and Architecture Museum. The exhibition was expanded and shown at Memphis Brooks Museum of Art, and then at Spelman College Museum of Fine Art.

== Books and edited volumes ==
Her published books and volumes include:

- Intratextuality: Greek and Roman Textual Relations, edited with Alison Sharrock (2001, Oxford University Press)
- Vision and Narrative in Achilles Tatius' Leucippe and Clitophon (2005, Cambridge University Press)
- Classical Mythology: A Very Short Introduction (2007, Oxford University Press)
- Dying for Josephus, edited with Simon Goldhill (2007, a special issue of Ramus).
- Petronius, Satyricon, edited with introduction and notes, (2011, Penguin Classics)
- Greek Fiction, commissioned new translations, edited, with introduction and notes, (2011, Penguin Classics)
- Pilgrimage to Dollywood: A Country Music Road Trip Through Tennessee (2014, University of Chicago Press)
- New Essays on Homer: Language, Violence, and Agency, co-edited with Sara Lindheim (2015, a special volume of Ramus)
- Antigone Rising: The Subversive Power of the Ancient Myths (2020, Bold Type Books)
- Reception in the Greco-Roman World, edited with Marco Fantuzzi and Tim Whitmarsh (2021, Cambridge University Press)
- Wayne Shorter and esperanza spalding's... (Iphigenia): Interdisciplinary Approaches, edited with Mario Telò (2023, Cambridge University Press, a special issue of Ramus)
