= Anne Heurgon-Desjardins =

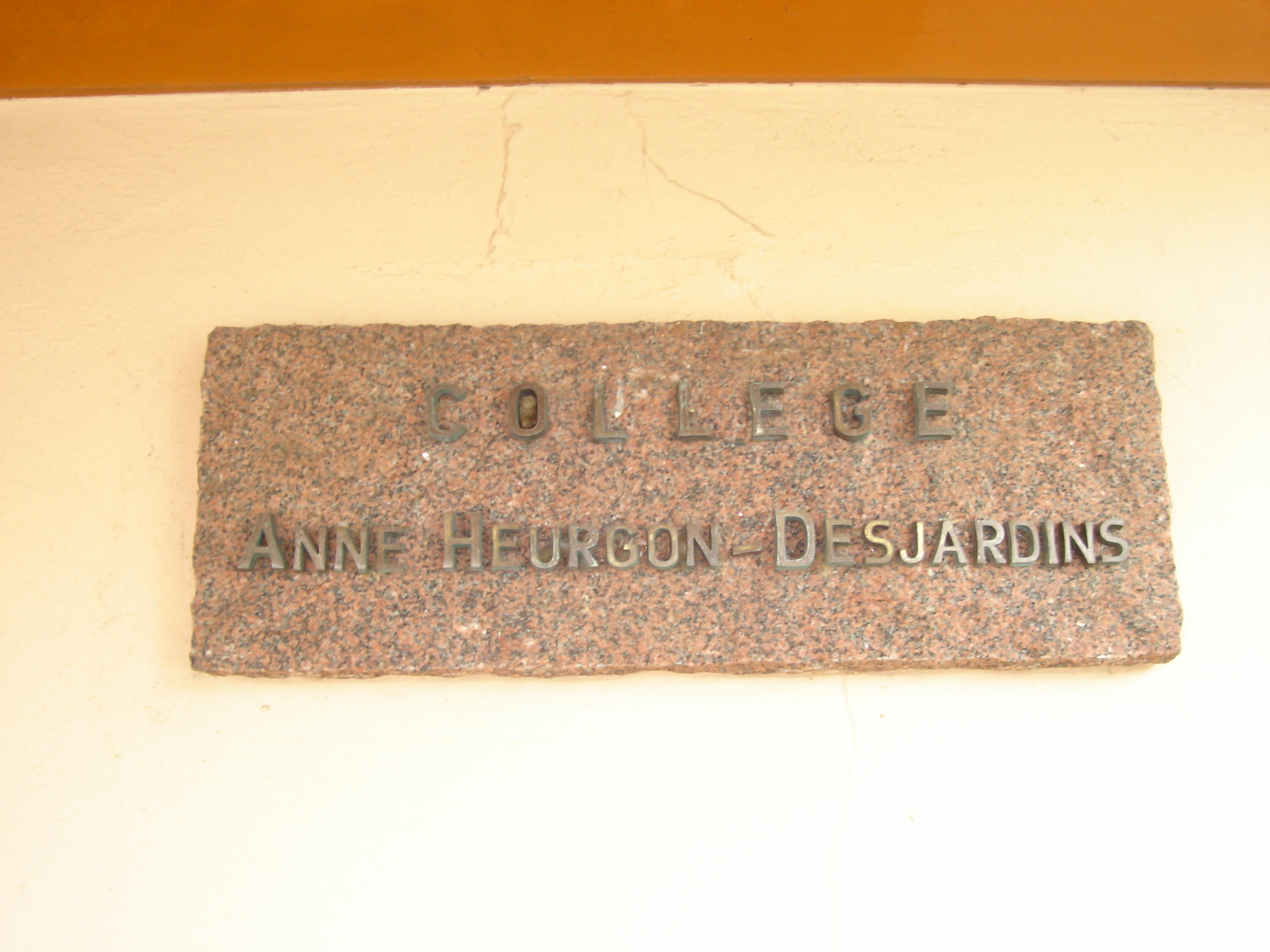
Plaque with the name of college Anne Heurgons Desjardins

Anne Heurgon-Desjardins (born 1899 – 1977, Manche) was a French philanthropist, the founder of the Centre culturel international de Cerisy-la-Salle.

== Biography ==
The daughter of professor and journalist Paul Desjardins, founder of the Décades de Pontigny at the abbaye de Pontigny in the Yonne department, Anne Heurgon-Desjardins married the scholar Jacques Heurgon (1903–1995) in 1926, a former student of her father.

After the death of her father in 1940, she decided with her mother to sell the abbaye de Pontigny in order to renovate the château of Cerisy-la-Salle, a maternal property. In 1947, at the reopening of the Centre culturel international of Royaumont, whose Board of Administration she was a member, she resumed, with the help of Henry Goüin and Gilbert Gadoffre, the idea of the "Décades" and "libres entretiens" imagined by her father at the Abbaye de Pontigny, first by moving them to the abbaye de Royaumont (Val-d'Oise). In 1949, she sold a part of her father's library, which was bought by Henry Goüin and Isabel Goüin, then founded the Centre culturel international de Cerisy-la-Salle and the association of the friends of Pontigny-Cerisy in 1952. In this place, she welcomed writers such as Raymond Aron, Martin Heidegger, Francis Ponge, Raymond Queneau, Eugène Ionesco and Alain Robbe-Grillet.

Upon her death, her daughters Catherine and Edith Heurgon Peyrou in turn kept on perpetuating these meetings.
