= André Gaudreault =

Canadian film historian and theorist (born 1952)

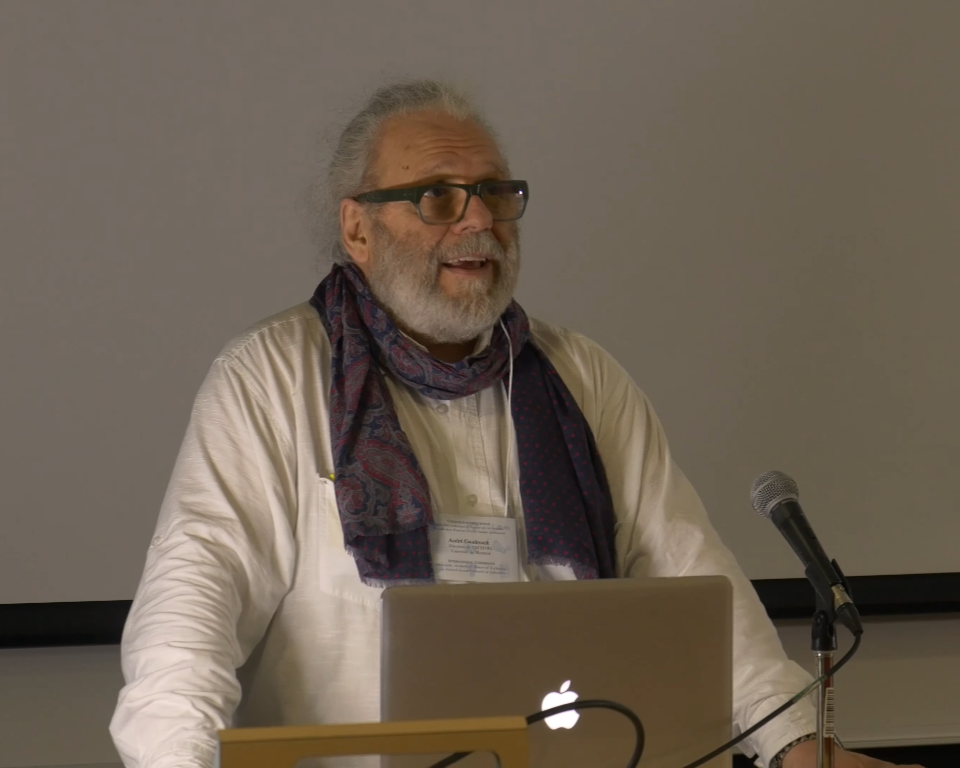
- Gaudreault in 2019
- Born: April 23, 1952 (age 74); Quebec City, Quebec, Canada
- Awards: Killam Prize (2018); FRSC (2014); Order of Canada (Officer)

Academic background
- Influences: Christian Metz, Gérard Genette

Academic work
- Discipline: Film history, Film theory
- Institutions: Université de Montréal
- Main interests: Early cinema, Film editing, Narratology
- Notable works: Film and Attraction: From Kinematography to Cinema

André Gaudreault OC FRSC (born 23 April 1952) is a Canadian film historian and theorist who holds the Canada Research Chair in Film and Media Studies.

== Bibliography ==
After obtaining a bachelor's degree in 1975 at Université Laval in Quebec City, he continued his studies at Université Sorbonne-Nouvelle, where he did doctoral work under Michel Marie and Michel Colin, obtaining his Ph.D. in 1983 with a dissertation entitled “Récit scriptural, récit théâtral, récit filmique: prolégomènes à une théorie narratologique du cinéma". During his studies, he became familiar with the work of Gérard Genette on narratology and with that of Christian Metz on film semiotics. These two thinkers have exercised a great influence on his work.

Following his doctorate, he was named associate professor and later full professor at Université Laval, where he taught until 1991, when he became a full professor at the Université de Montréal. In 1992 he co-founded, with Germain Lacasse, the Groupe de recherche sur l’avènement et la formation des institutions cinématographique et scénique (GRAFICS) and then, in 1997, with three colleagues from the Université de Montréal, the Centre de Recherche sur l’Intermédialité/Centre for Research into Intermediality (CRI), which he headed until 2005. From 1999 to 2016 he was director of the journal Cinémas. In 2007, he co-founded, with Denis Héroux, the Observatoire du cinéma au Québec, a scholarly crossroads which encourages exchange and partnerships between cinema professionals in Quebec and film students. In 2012, he co-founded, with Gilles Mouëllic (Université Rennes 2) and Maria Tortajada (Université de Lausanne) the international research partnership TECHNÈS, of which he is also the director.

Since 2013 he has held the Canada Research Chair in Film and Media Studies. In 2016 he founded the Laboratoire CinéMédias. Currently, he is director of the Programme de recherche sur l’archéologie et la généalogie du montage/editing (PRAGM/e), which he co-founded in 2018.

He is or has been a member of various scholarly journal committees, including: Les Cahiers de la Cinémathèque (Perpignan, France); Sociétés & Représentations (Université Panthéon-Sorbonne, France); Film History (American Museum of the Moving Image, New York); Archivos de la Filmoteca (Valencia, Spain); Early Popular Visual Culture (formerly Living Pictures: The Journal of the Popular and Projected Image, Abingdon, England); Cinema & Cie (Università degli Studi di Udine, Italy); Recherches en communication (Université catholique de Louvain, Belgium); and 1895. (Paris, France).

== Work ==
His work combines a historical and theoretical approach. This dual orientation is at the heart of his principal books, Du littéraire au filmique (1988; translated in 2009 as From Plato to Lumière: Narration and Monstration in Literature and Cinema); and Cinéma et attraction (2008; translated in 2011 as Film and Attraction: From Kinematography to Cinema). These volumes examine the earliest years of cinema from both a historiographical and a narratological perspective.

His scholarly work forms part of what is known as the “new film history.” This new approach, which coincided with the emergence of cinema studies in North American universities, was the fruit of young film historians working in the late 1970s. These “new historians” rejected teleological and linear approaches, along with the “great man theory,” which had characterised film history before then. They were driven above all by a concern for scholarly accuracy rather than by cinephilia and based their work on close analysis of period sources (both films and non-film objects) and archival work.

In this respect, André Gaudreault's work underscores the importance of the intrication of cultural practices in cinema's genesis. In From Plato to Lumière (2009 [1988]) and Film and Attraction (2011 [2008]), Gaudreault also emphasised the role of a number of economic, technical and legal contingencies in the emergence and institutionalisation of cinematic practices. Known for the concepts “the cinema of attractions” and “kine-attractography” (“cinématographie-attraction”), André Gaudreault was also one of the first scholars to foreground the concepts “intermediality” and “cultural series.”

With François Jost, he is the co-author of Le Récit cinématographique, an introductory volume to narratological theories of cinema which has been republished several times and translated into various languages. Developing terminology borrowed from Gérard Genette, Tzvevetan Todorov and Étienne Souriau, this book explores the different elements of cinematic narrative, such as the filmic narrator, time, space and point of view. Francesco Casetti explains: “[Gaudreault and Jost’s] merit lies in the analysis of the relation between the narrated story and the act of narration, as well as in the discovery—in the encounter of these two components—of the various forms a story can have".

With Philippe Marion, a professor at the Université catholique de Louvain, he is the author of numerous articles on what the two scholars call the “genealogy of media” and the “double birth of media". This work addresses narrative in early cinema and the institutionalisation of cinematic practices and led to the publication of a volume on cinema's recent transformations in the wake of the “digital revolution.” The End of Cinema? A Medium in Crisis in the Digital Age (2015 [2012]) examines cinema's many “deaths foretold” and interrogates the impact these periods of transition has had on cinema's very identity.

=== New film history ===
Gaudreault's work on early cinema has contributed to the rise of film studies since the 1980s. The famous article he co-wrote with Tom Gunning in 1989, “Le cinéma des premiers temps: un défi à l’histoire du cinéma” (translated in 2006 as [“Early Cinema as a Challenge for Film History”) which drew on a joint presentation at Cerisy in 1985, is a key text for the new history of cinema. In it the authors propose a new way of looking at early cinema, no longer on the basis of a teleological approach, founded on aesthetic and discursive criteria completely alien to the pre-1915 context, but rather on the basis of cinema's own language and modalities and the cultural context of the period. Not only did this approach contest the traditional history of cinema; it also implicitly called for a return to period sources and the need to pay particular attention to the context in which the films under study emerged. This article also contributed to popularise the important concept Gaudreault and Gunning developed, the “cinema of attractions” (which Gaudreault contrasts with “institutional cinema”). The cinema of attractions, also described as a “system of monstrative attractions,” stands apart from the later “system of narrative integration” primarily for the self-sufficient and autonomous nature of its shots.

As a historian and theorist, Gaudreault seeks to highlight the narrative and formal specificities of cinema while at the same time rejecting, sometimes in polemical fashion, the essentialist approach of film histories (film historians of previous generations, such as Jean Mitry and Georges Sadoul, almost all came out of film criticism). This approach measures this early kinematography against modern cinema, sometimes speaking incorrectly, in French, of “primitive cinema” or “nascent cinema” rather than conceiving it according to its own context.

André Gaudreault's earliest research was part of a process of “rediscovering” early cinema by the founders of the “new history.” It resulted in part from his participation in the now legendary 34th FIAF Congress in Brighton in 1978, where hundreds of hitherto practically unknown animated pictures made between 1900 and 1906 were shown. Gaudreault was one of the founders of Domitor (the International Society for the Study of Early Cinema), for which he served as the first elected president from 1987 to 1995.

André Gaudreault has written numerous articles on early cinema and what he has called, in reference to the terminology of the period, “kine-attractography” (“cinématographie-attraction”). These articles address topics such as historiography and periodisation; the emergence of editing techniques; trick effects and mise en scène (in the work of Georges Mélies in particular); film exhibition and the film lecturer; mise en scène and acting in animated pictures; sales catalogues and promotional documents; optical toys; etc.

=== Editing ===
André Gaudreault has devoted a large part of his career to studying the history of editing practices. After having analysed the development of crosscutting in early cinema, he turned to the stop-camera technique in the work of Méliès, and more precisely to the different forms of abutting and découpage in Lumière pictures. On the basis of the close analysis of animated pictures from before 1905, long described by film historians (in particular Georges Sadoul and Jean Mitry, but not only them) as tableaux without cuts, Gaudreault demonstrated that early cinema frequently resorted to editing, but often with non-narrative ends. These traces of editing were the work of the camera operator during the capturing of the event, or of the manufacturer when the film was being prepared in the laboratory, or of the exhibitor, who could cut the film at will. In cinema's early years, editing techniques were often inherited from other contemporary cultural practices, in particular photography, prestidigitation and the magic lantern. André Gaudreault's work has underscored the fact that these practices privilege, in the first place, a kind of presentation described as ministrative, in keeping with the logic of a theatrical attraction or a one-act play. Gradually, editing practices came to fulfill a narrative function. This was the case, for example, with crosscutting, which fragments into several different narrative segments the unity of time, space and action found in the theatrical model of the one-act tableau

=== Cinema of attractions and “kine-attractography” ===
The cinema of attractions is a thesis formulated by André Gaudreault and Tom Gunning to describe the style of early kinematography. Pictures by Edison, Lumière, Méliès and Urban, and comic scenes by Segundo de Chomón, Émile Cohl, Alice Guy and R.W. Paul, took forms proper to early cinema: the frontality of the mise en scène; the brief, unipunctual nature of the picture, sometimes conceived as a one-act tableau without visible cuts; numerous glances at the camera; the ostentatious nature of comic or fairy-play effects; and an aesthetic of shock, the marvellous or surprise. Gaudreault and Gunning made a distinction between films in which “monstrative attractions” predominated, particularly in pictures made from 1895 to 1905, and those in which a mode of “narrative integration” predominated, particularly in later films. Filmic practices relying more on “monstration” and those in which “narration” dominated were not mutually exclusive.

In 2006, on the occasion of the publication of the edited volume The Cinema of Attractions Reloaded, Gaudreault revisited this concept and expressed reservations concerning the teleological nature of the expression “the cinema of attractions.” Because the term “cinema” refers naturally to the institutional practices which took concrete form around 1915, he proposed instead to employ the neologism “kine-attractography,” (from the French expression “cinématographie-attraction,” used for the first time by G.-Michel Coissac in 1925 and adopted by Gaudreault in his writings in French).

=== Intermediality and cultural series ===
André Gaudreault approaches the earliest years of cinema and cinema practices from an intermedial perspective. The intermedial approach consists in taking into account contemporaneous cultural practices which inspired or shaped the work of kinematographers. According to him, kinematic practices of the early years were the result of an “intermedial meshing” which encouraged a “hodgepodge of institutions”: “Before the cinema ended up becoming a relatively autonomous medium, kinematography was not merely subjected to the influence of the other media and cultural spaces in vogue at the turn of the twentieth century. It truly was at one and the same time magic lantern show, fairy play, magic act and music hall or vaudeville act. At the beginning of the twentieth century, intermedial meshing was so fertile in the world of kinematography that a great number of animated views paid tribute to other media or media spaces, if only in the topic they were addressing". Initially, kinematic practices were not, properly speaking, cinematic. They acquired a cinematic nature only through necessity, a phenomenon Gaudreault calls cinema's “institutionalisation.” He demonstrates that “institutionalisation” is “an evolutionary and diachronic process that supposes the regulation, regularisation and consolidation of the relationship between those who work in it (stability); the choice of practices that are proper to the medium in question, thereby distinguishing it from other media (specificity); and the setting up of discourses and mechanisms that sanction these relationships and practices (legitimacy)". According to Gaudreault, kinematic practices drew on techniques derived from “cultural series” of an attractional nature before these practices were constituted as their own “cultural series.” In his work, “cultural series” are media practices with specific conventions and uses, such as fairy plays, magic lanterns or prestidigitation. They form more or less extensive and homogeneous ensembles, like stage shows or attractions.

== Principal publications ==
- André Gaudreault and François Jost, Le Récit cinématographique: Films et séries télévisées. Paris: Armand Colin, 2017 (3rd revised and expanded edition of Récit cinématographique, published in 1990 and translated into Spanish, Korean, Chinese and Portuguese).
- André Gaudreault and Philippe Marion, The End of Cinema? A Medium in Crisis in the Digital Age (translation of La fin du cinéma? by Timothy Barnard). New York: Columbia University Press, 2015 (a volume accompanied by an Internet supplement at theendofcinema.com).
- André Gaudreault and Philippe Marion, La fin du cinéma? Un média en crise à l’ère du numérique. Paris: Armand Colin, 2013 (a volume accompanied by an Internet supplement at finducinema.com).
- André Gaudreault and Philippe Marion, The Kinematic Turn: Film in the Digital Era and its Ten Problems. Montreal: caboose, 2012.
- André Gaudreault, Film and Attraction: From Kinematography to Cinema (translation of Cinéma et attraction by Timothy Barnard). Urbana: University of Illinois Press, 2011 (with a preface by Rick Altman).
- André Gaudreault, From Plato to Lumière: Narration and Monstration in Literature and Cinema (translation of Du littéraire au filmique by Timothy Barnard). Toronto: University of Toronto Press, 2009 (with a preface by Tom Gunning).
- André Gaudreault, Cinéma et attraction: Pour une nouvelle histoire du cinématographe. Paris: CNRS, 2008 (revised and expanded version of a previous version published in Italian under the title Cinema delle origini: O della “cinematografia-attrazion”).
- André Gaudreault, Cinema delle origini: O della “cinematografia-attrazione”. Milan: Il Castoro, 2004 (first version of Cinéma et attraction, published directly in Italian in a translation by Viva Paci).
- André Gaudreault, Du littéraire au filmique: Système du récit. Paris and Quebec City: Armand Colin/Nota bene, 1999 (revised and expanded 2nd edition, with a preface by Paul Ricœur and an afterword entitled “Le cinéma: entre littérarité et intermédialité,” pp. 169–83. Translated into Italian, English, Chinese and Spanish).

== Editorial responsibilities ==
- André Gaudreault and Martin Lefebvre (eds.), Techniques et technologies du cinéma: Modalités, usages et pratiques des dispositifs cinématographiques à travers l’histoire. Rennes: Presses universitaires de Rennes, 2015.
- André Gaudreault, Laurent Le Forestier and Stéphane Tralongo (eds.), Méliès, carrefour des attractions, followed by a critical edition of Correspondance de Georges Méliès (1904-1937) established by Jacques Malthête. Rennes: Presses universitaires de Rennes, 2014.
- Nicolas Dulac, André Gaudreault and Santiago Hidalgo (eds.), A Companion to Early Cinema. Hoboken: Wiley-Blackwell, 2012.
- André Gaudreault (ed.), American Cinema, 1890-1909: Themes and Variations (the first volume of the series Screen Decades: American Culture/American Cinema). New Brunswick: Rutgers University Press, 2009.
- André Gaudreault, Catherine Russell and Pierre Véronneau (eds.), Le Cinématographe, nouvelle technologie du XXe siècle. Lausanne: Payot Lausanne, 2004.
- François Albera, Marta Braun and André Gaudreault (eds.), Arrêt sur image, fragmentation du temps: Aux sources de la culture visuelle moderne/Stop Motion: Fragmentation of Time: Exploring the Roots of Modern Cinema. Lausanne, Payot Lausanne, 2002.
- La vie ou du moins ses apparences: Émergence du cinéma dans la presse de la Belle Époque. Montreal: Cinémathèque québécoise/GRAFICS, 2002 (an anthology edited, annotated and with commentary by André Gaudreault and Jean-Pierre Sirois-Trahan).
- André Gaudreault, Germain Lacasse and Isabelle Raynauld (eds.), Le cinéma en histoire: Institution cinématographique, réception filmique et reconstitution historique. Paris and Quebec City: Méridiens Klincksieck/Nota bene, 1999.
- Claire Dupré La Tour, André Gaudreault and Roberta Pearson (eds.), Le Cinéma au tournant du siècle. Quebec City and Lausanne: Nota Bene/Payot Lausanne, 1999.
- André Gaudreault and Thierry Groensteen (eds.), La transécriture: Pour une théorie de l’adaptation. Quebec City and Angoulême: Nota Bene/Centre national de la bande dessinée et de l’image, 1998.
- André Gaudreault, Germain Lacasse and Jean-Pierre Sirois-Trahan (eds.), Au pays des ennemis du cinéma… Pour une nouvelle histoire des débuts du cinéma au Québec. Quebec City: Nuit blanche, 1996.
- André Gaudreault (ed.), with the collaboration of Tom Gunning and Alain Lacasse, Pathé 1900: Fragments d’une filmographie analytique du cinéma des premiers temps. Paris and Sainte-Foy: Presses de la Sorbonne Nouvelle/Presses de l’Université Laval, 1993.
- Roland Cosandey, André Gaudreault and Tom Gunning (eds.), Une invention du diable? Cinéma des premiers temps et religion/An Invention of the Devil? Religion and Early Cinema. Lausanne and Sainte-Foy: Payot Lausanne/Presses de l’Université Laval, 1992.
- Jacques Aumont, André Gaudreault and Michel Marie (eds.), L’histoire du cinéma: Nouvelles approches. Paris: Publications de la Sorbonne, 1989.
- André Gaudreault (ed.), Ce que je vois de mon ciné… La représentation du regard dans le cinéma des premiers temps. Paris: Méridiens Klincksieck, 1988.
- André Gaudreault (ed.), Cinema 1900-1906: An Analytical Study, vol. 2. Filmographie analytique/Analytical Filmography. Brussels: FIAF, 1982.

== Honours ==
- 2022 - Order of Canada, with the rank of Officer.
- 2019 - Honorary Doctorate, Université Paul-Valéry Montpellier 3.
- 2018 - Killam Prize in the humanities, awarded by the Canada Council for the Arts to “recognise the career achievements of eminent Canadian scholars and scientists.”
- 2017 - Prix Léon Gérin, “the highest distinction, given annually by the Government of Quebec,” in the humanities and social sciences.
- 2016 - Named knight in the Ordre des Arts et des Lettres by the French Ministry of Culture.
- 2015 - Inclusion in the Canadian Who’s Who, which since 1910 has been publishing the biographies of the most influential Canadians.
- 2014 - André Laurendeau Award, given annually to “a researcher to highlight the excellence and impact of his or her work and activities in the humanities.”
- 2014 - Elected to the Royal Society of Canada (the Arts and Humanities division of the Academy of Arts and Humanities), in recognition of his “exceptional contribution” to intellectual life in Canada.
- 2013 - Granted a Guggenheim Fellowship, in recognition of his “extraordinary scholarly output.”
- 2010 - International Jean Mitry Award, granted annually by the organising committee of the international Giornate del Cinema Muto festival in Pordenone, Italy, to individuals or institutions who have stood out for the contribution to the preservation and re-evaluation of silent cinema.
- 2010 - First French-speaking scholar invited to give the Martin Walsh Memorial Lecture, presented annually by the Film Studies Association of Canada (FSAC) since 1978.
- 1997-1999 - Killam Research Fellowship (Canada Council for the Arts).
- 1994 - AQEC-Olivieri Award (Association québécoise des études cinématographiques and Librairie Olivieri) for the best Quebec film book of the year for Pathé 1900: Fragments d’une filmographie analytique du cinéma des premiers temps.
