= Xavier Darcos =

French politician and latinist (born 1947)

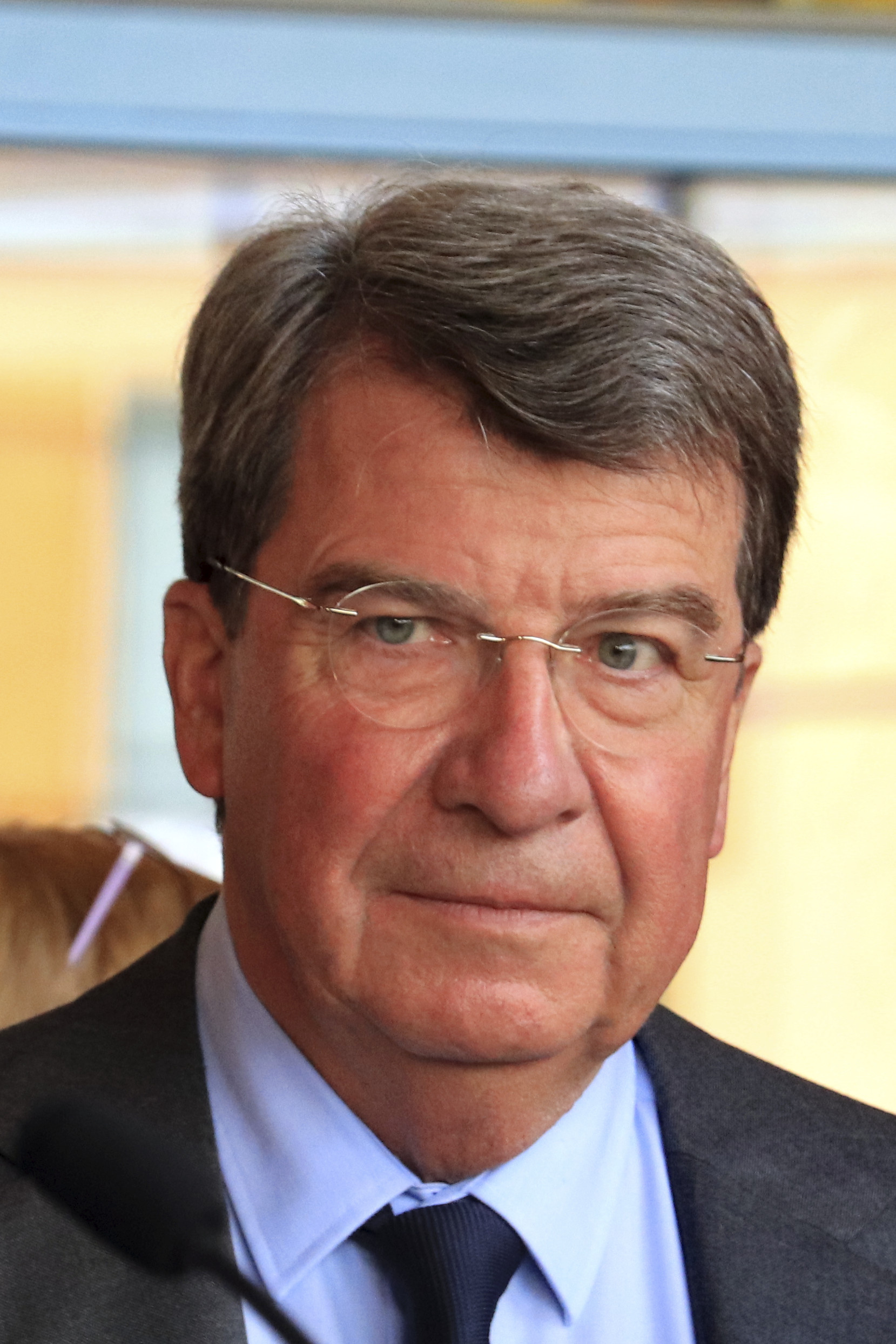
- Darcos in May 2019

Minister of National Education
- In office 18 May 2007 – 23 June 2009
- President: Nicolas Sarkozy
- Prime Minister: François Fillon
- Preceded by: Gilles de Robien
- Succeeded by: Luc Chatel

Member of the French Senate for Dordogne
- In office 1 October 1998 – 7 June 2002
- Succeeded by: Dominique Mortemousque

Mayor of Périgueux
- In office 20 January 1997 – 7 June 2002
- Preceded by: Yves Guéna
- Succeeded by: Jean-Paul Daudou
- In office 17 September 2005 – 16 March 2008
- Preceded by: Jean-Paul Daudou
- Succeeded by: Michel Moyrand

Personal details
- Born: 14 July 1947 (age 79) Limoges, France
- Party: UMP
- Spouse: Laure Driant (m. 1999)
- Children: 3
- Education: University of Bordeaux

Xavier Darcos (French pronunciation: [ɡzavje daʁkɔs]; born 14 July 1947) is a French politician, scholar, civil servant and former Minister of Labour.

An agrégé professor in literature and general inspector of the National Education system, he has been Mayor of Périgueux, a Senator, and a minister in Jean-Pierre Raffarin and François Fillon's governments.

== Biography ==
Darcos was born on 14 July 1947 in Limoges to Jean-Gabriel Darcos and Anne-Marie Banvillet.

After getting a PhD in Latin studies from the University of Bordeaux under the direction of Jean-Pierre Néraudau and becoming a professor emeritus in letters and social sciences, he started teaching in 1968, first in Périgueux, then in a Bordeaux khâgne from 1982 to 1987, and finally at the Lycée Louis-le-Grand, Paris from 1987 to 1992.

In 1989 he became deputy to the Mayor of Périgueux. Three years later, he became a senior school inspector.

From 1993 to 1995 he was the chief of staff (directeur de cabinet) to Education Minister François Bayrou, from 1995 to 1997 advisor to Prime Minister Alain Juppé for education and culture matters, and from 1995 to 1998, along with François Bayroux and Claude Allègre, he was the president of school inspectors. From 1996 to 1999 he was also a Professor in comparative literature at the Paris IV University.

In 1997 he became Mayor of Périgueux, and was reelected both in 2001 and 2005. He was also elected Senator of Dordogne in 1998.

In May 2002, he became Minister for School Education in Jean-Pierre Raffarin's cabinet, then on 1 April 2004 Minister for Cooperation, Development and Francophony.

He has been a member of the Aquitaine Regional Council since 2004. On 15 June 2005 he became a French ambassador for the OCDE.

In 2006, he was elected as member of the Académie des sciences morales et politiques and was its secrétaire perpétuel from 2010 until 2017.

Since 18 May 2007, he has been the Minister of National Education in François Fillon's governments. In March 2008, he failed to be reelected as Mayor of Périgueux.

In 2009, he condemned as "criminal" statements made by Pope Benedict XVI which claimed that condoms promote AIDS, when in fact they help protect against it.

Darcos was elected as an immortel of the Académie Française on 13 June 2013.

== Political career ==
Governmental functions

- Minister of Labor, Social Affairs, Family, and Solidarity : 2009–2010.
- Minister of National Education : 2007–2009.
- Minister of School Education : 2002–2004.
- Minister of Development, Cooperation and Francophony : 2004–2005.

Electoral mandates

Senate of France

Senator of Dordogne : 1998–2002 (Became minister in 2002).

Regional Council

Regional councillor of Aquitaine : Since 2004. Reelected in 2010.

Municipal Council

- Mayor of Périgueux : 1997–2002 (Resignation) / 2005–2008. Reelected in 2001, 2005.
- Deputy-mayor of Périgueux : 1989–1997 / 2002–2005. Reelected in 1995.
- Municipal councillor of Périgueux : 1989–2008. Reelected in 1995, 2001.

Agglomeration community Council

- President of the Agglomeration community of Périgueux : 2000–2001.
- Member of the Agglomeration community of Périgueux : 2000–2001.

== Awards and honours ==
- Xavier Darcos entered the Academy of Moral and Political Sciences in 2006, and the French Academy in 2013. He is also a Commander of the Legion of Honour, Officer of the National Order of Merit, Commander of the Academic Palm and Commander of the Art and letter decoration.

== Bibliography ==
- Histoire de la littérature française, 1992
- Approches ovidiennes de la mort, 1995
- Mérimée, 1998
- Robert des grands écrivains de langue française, (with other writers)
- L'Art d'apprendre à ignorer, 2000
- Dictionnaire des mythes féminins, 2002 (with other writers)
- Lettre à tous ceux qui aiment l'école, 2003 (en coll.)
- Deux voix pour une école, 2004 (with other writers)
- L'École de Jules Ferry, 2005 (Prix Louis-Pauwels in 2006)
- L'État et les Églises, 1905–2005, 2005
- L'État et les Églises, la question laïque, 2006
- Tacite, ses vérités sont les nôtres, 2007
- Bruno Neveu (1936–2004), Institut de France, 2007
- La escuela republicana en Francia, Prensas universitarias de Zaragoza, 2008 (ISBN 978-84-92521-38-8)
- René Haby par lui-même, en coll., INRP, 2009, (ISBN 2-7342-1100-9)
- L'école forme-t-elle encore des citoyens ?, avec Aurélie Filippetti, Frémeaux & Associés, 2008
- Peut-on améliorer l'école sans dépenser plus ?, avec Vincent Peillon, Magnard, 2009 (ISBN 978-2210747852)
- Ovide et la mort, PUF, Coll. « Hors collection », 2009 (ISBN 978-2-13-057818-5)
- Une anthologie historique de la poésie française, PUF, coll. « Hors collection », 2010 (ISBN 978-2-13-058506-0)
- Dictionnaire amoureux de la Rome antique, Plon, 2011 (ISBN 978-2-2592-1245-8)
- La Poésie française, Eyrolles, coll. « Mes passions », 2012 (ISBN 978-2-212-55533-2)
- Histoire de la littérature française, Hachette, 2013 (ISBN 978-2-01-160932-8)
- Oscar a toujours raison, Plon, 2013 (ISBN 978-2-259-21069-0)
- Auguste et son siècle, Artlys, 2014, (ISBN 978-2-85495-578-1)
- Jean-Pierre Angrémy, dit Pierre-Jean Remy, Institut de France, 2015
- Dictionnaire amoureux de l'Ecole, Plon, 2016, (ISBN 978-2-259-227599)
- Virgile, notre vigie, Fayard, 2017, (ISBN 978-2-213-70457-9)

Political offices
Preceded by Gilles de Robien	Minister of National Education; 2007–2009	Succeeded by Luc Chatel
