= The Day of the Barbarians =

2007 book

The Day of the Barbarians: The Battle That Led to the Fall of the Roman Empire
- Author: Alessandro Barbero
- Genre: Non-fiction
- Publisher: Walker Books
- Publication date: 2007
- Pages: 180
- ISBN: 9780802716712

The Day of the Barbarians: The Battle That Led to the Fall of the Roman Empire is a 2007 nonfiction book by Alessandro Barbero about the Battle of Adrianople. After two centuries in which the "barbarians" were successfully integrated in the Roman Empire, a particular episode seems to set the end of this age. Due to corruption and bad organization of the migration phenomenon, the Roman Empire started its fall after this single-day battle, which saw the Goths immigrants taking over the Roman army.

== Bibliography ==
- 'The Day of the Barbarians: The Battle That Led to the Fall of the Roman Empire' (2007) Publishers Weekly, 254(4), 174 Gale A158576998
- Desmond, Stewart. "Barbero, Alessandro. The Day of the Barbarians: The Battle That Led to the Fall of the Roman Empire." Library Journal, vol. 132, no. 10, 1 June 2007, p. 127. Gale A165193891
