= Madeleine Malthête-Méliès =

French film archivist and historian (1923–2018)

- Born: 1923; France
- Died: 8 July 2018; France
- Occupations: Film archivist, film historian
- Known for: Recovery and preservation of Georges Méliès's films; founding of the Cinémathèque Méliès
- Relatives: Georges Méliès (grandfather)

Madeleine Malthête-Méliès (1923 – 8 July 2018) was a French film archivist and historian, granddaughter of Georges Méliès (1861–1938), pioneer of early cinema. Over seven decades, she devoted her life to locating, identifying, and presenting her grandfather's films across the world, recovering more than 200 works previously believed lost. She co-founded the Cinémathèque Méliès and was a founding member of the Cinémathèque française, and is regarded as one of the central figures of worldwide cinematic heritage preservation.

== Early life ==
In 1930, when Madeleine was seven years old, her mother Georgette Méliès died after a prolonged illness. Her father, a lyric singer, was unable to care for a young child, and she went to live with her maternal grandparents: Georges Méliès himself and his second wife, the actress Jeanne d'Alcy, known within the family as "Fanny". Madeleine lived alongside her grandfather through the most difficult years of his life — the period of the toy-and-sweet kiosk at the Gare Montparnasse and, from 1932, at the Maison de Retraite du Cinéma (the film industry retirement home) in Orly.

After the death of Georges Méliès on 21 January 1938, Madeleine remained in Orly with "Fanny" until June 1939. Her close relationship with her grandfather during childhood and adolescence gave her direct access to memories, documents, and production materials unavailable to any external researcher — a foundation that would lend singular authority to her later preservation work.

== Work at the Cinémathèque française ==
After the Second World War, Madeleine became a collaborator of Henri Langlois at the Cinémathèque française, where she worked between 1943 and 1945. Langlois, co-founder of the institution, encouraged her to search for her grandfather's films, of which only eight copies were then known to survive in France.

== Search for Méliès's films ==
From 1949, aged 26 and already the mother of three children, Madeleine began a series of lectures and film screenings abroad at the invitation of the French Ministry of Foreign Affairs, starting with Scandinavia. During that first tour, in Sweden, she received from film historian Einar Lauritzen a hand-coloured copy of La Fée Carabosse ou le Poignard fatal (1906) — the beginning of the collection she would build over decades.

Over the following decades, she travelled across Europe, North and South America, Africa, the Middle East, Japan, and Taiwan in search of Méliès's films. She located copies in archives affiliated with the Fédération internationale des archives de films (FIAF), but also among private collectors, antique dealers, flea markets, and unlikely places — including a box containing a fragment of A Trip to the Moon found in a chicken coop. All recovered copies were deposited in the CNC archive at Bois d'Arcy.

The French Ministry of Culture subsequently sponsored further missions abroad, extending the geographical scope of her tours. The formula of ciné-concerts — film screenings with live piano accompaniment presented in the manner of fairground entertainers, inaugurated by Madeleine in 1978 with the programmes Méliès tel qu'en lui-même and Les Burlesques de Méliès — became the presentation model adopted by the association.

== Cinémathèque Méliès ==
In May 1961, the centenary year of Georges Méliès's birth, Madeleine and her husband Dr René Malthête (1908–1978) founded the association Les Amis de Georges Méliès, later renamed the Cinémathèque Méliès. The association's mission was to locate, preserve, and promote the work of Méliès, then considered largely lost. It immediately attracted members from the Méliès family, magicians, collectors, and international film archives.

Under Madeleine's leadership, the association organised three major international academic colloquia on Méliès, all held at the Centre Culturel International de Cerisy-la-Salle: in 1981 (Méliès et la naissance du spectacle cinématographique), in 1996 (Méliès, l'illusionniste fin de siècle, in partnership with the Université Sorbonne Nouvelle), and in 2011 (Méliès, carrefour des attractions).

In 1981, commissioned by the CNC, Madeleine and her team compiled the Essai de reconstitution du catalogue français de la Star-Film, followed by an Analyse catalographique des films de Georges Méliès recensés en France, published by the CNC in September of that year — described as the first work of its kind in the world and recognised as a model of methodological rigour.

In 2004, she sold to the CNC her non-film collection — more than one thousand items including production stills, drawings, costumes, and magical objects acquired with her own resources — which were entrusted to the Cinémathèque française. In 2011, she donated to the Cinémathèque française the nitrate negatives and printing elements of 77 films in 35 mm, while the Cinémathèque Méliès association simultaneously donated 144 films to the same institution. This combined collection made possible the creation of the Musée Méliès, inaugurated at the Cinémathèque française in 2021.

== Published works ==
Her published works include Georges Méliès, l'enchanteur (Paris: Hachette, 1973; revised and expanded 2011), Méliès et la naissance du spectacle cinématographique (editor; Paris: Klincksieck, 1984), and Magnificent Méliès: The Authorized Biography (English translation, with Matthew Solomon and Kel Pero; Ann Arbor: University of Michigan Press, 2023).

== Legacy ==
Madeleine Malthête-Méliès died on 8 July 2018, aged 95. Over approximately 75 years of work, she contributed to the survival of Georges Méliès's legacy: what stood at eight known films in France in 1945 grew to more than 200 recovered titles, making Méliès one of the pioneering filmmakers with the best-preserved body of work in cinema history.

The organisation Domitor, dedicated to the study of early cinema, described her as a pioneering researcher and film historian who worked for more than 75 years to locate surviving copies and screen them for audiences worldwide.
