= Don Paul Fowler =

English classicist

- Born: 21 May 1953
- Died: 15 October 1999 (aged 46)
- Spouse: Peta Moon (m. 1977)

Academic background
- Education: King Edward VI Camp Hill School for Boys, Birmingham; Christ Church, Oxford

Academic work
- Discipline: Classical studies
- Sub-discipline: Latin poetry
- Institutions: Magdelen College, Oxford; Balliol College, Oxford; Jesus College, Oxford

Don Paul Fowler (21 May 1953 – 15 October 1999) was an English classicist.

== Life ==
Fowler was from a Birmingham working-class background and went to King Edward VI Camp Hill School for Boys there. After completing his studies at Christ Church, Oxford, Fowler was first appointed Lecturer in Classics at Magdalen College (1976–77), subsequently Dyson Junior Research Fellow in Greek Culture at Balliol College (1978–80), then, at the early age of 28 years, Fellow and Tutor in Classics at Jesus College, holding simultaneously a University Lecturership in Greek and Latin Literature at Oxford University (1981–99). Endowed with an outgoing temperament, Fowler was connected to numerous classicists in North America and Europe. His command of Italian enabled him to give even extemporized talks in that language. Thus, he became an important middleman between Italian Latinists and British classicists in the eighties. He kept close ties in particular with Gian Biagio Conte and Alessandro Barchiesi and the Italian periodical Materiali e discussioni per l'analisi dei testi classici. Fowler also was on the editorial boards of further periodicals (amongst others the Journal of Roman Studies and Arachnion).

Fowler married classicist Peta Fowler (née Moon) in 1977 and they had a daughter, Sophia. He died of cancer in Oxford on 15 October 1999.

== Work ==
Although he did not leave a monograph at the time of his premature death, Fowler is to be reckoned amongst the outstanding Latinists of his generation on account of his intellectual range and originality. He was one of the pioneers in the application of modern literary theory and information technology within classical studies. His special research area in Latin literature was Roman Epicureanism and the works of Lucretius and Virgil, subjects to which he made numerous contributions, as he did to others. A book on Lucretius did not appear, however, nor did the long-awaited book with the provisional title Unrolling the Text: books and readers in classical Latin poetry, which was to cover the history of the book roll in antiquity and its function in ancient poetry. Nevertheless, a commentary on part of Book II of Lucretius has been published posthumously by his wife Peta. Moreover, Fowler wrote Subject Reviews in Latin Literature for the periodical Greece and Rome from 1986 to 1993 and was, together with his wife Peta, area editor for Latin literature in the third edition of the Oxford Classical Dictionary (see in particular his contributions on Lucretius, Virgil and Literary Theory and the Classics). As for literary theory, he worked in particular on irony, closure and intertextuality.

== Legacy ==
A bursary for an undergraduate student reading Classics at Jesus College, named in honour of Fowler, was endowed in perpetuity in 2024. A Festschrift in his memory, titled Classical Constructions: Papers in Memory of Don Fowler, Classicist and Epicurean, was published by Oxford University Press in 2007.

== Selected publications ==
Commentary

- Lucretius on atomic motion. A commentary on De rerum natura book two, lines 1 – 332, ed. by Peta Fowler, Oxford: Oxford University Press 2002. ISBN 0-19-924358-1

Edited books

- (with Efrossini Spentzou): Cultivating the Muse: Struggles for Power and Inspiration in Classical Literature. Oxford: Oxford University Press 2002. ISBN 0-19-924004-3
- (with D.H. Roberts and F.M. Dunn): Classical Closure: Reading the End in Greek and Latin Literature. Princeton 1997. ISBN 0-691-04452-X. Rev. Marilyn B. Skinner, Bryn Mawr Classical Review 97.12.13

Collection of articles

- Roman Constructions: Readings in Postmodern Latin. Oxford: Oxford University Press 2000. ISBN 0-19-815309-0

Articles

- "The Didactic Plot", in: Matrices of genre. Authors, canons, and society, ed. Dirk Obbink and Mary Depew, Cambridge, MA: Harvard University Press 2000 (Center for Hellenic Studies colloquia, 4). ISBN 0-674-00338-1
- "Epic in the Middle of the Wood: Mise en Abyme in the Nisus and Euryalus Episode", in: Intratextuality. Greek and Roman Textual Relations. Edited by Alison Sharrock and Helen Morales. Oxford 2000, 89–113.
- "From Epos to Cosmos: Lucretius, Ovid, and the Poetics of Segmentation", in: Ethics and Rhetoric. Classical Essays for Donald Russell on his Seventy-Fifth Birthday. Ed. by Doreen Innes, Harry Hine and Christopher Pelling. Oxford 1995, 3–18.
- "Deviant focalisation in Vergil's Aeneid", in: Proceedings of the Cambridge Philological Society 36 (1990) 42–63.
- "Lucretius and Politics", in: Philosophia Togata. Essays on Philosophy and Roman Society. Ed. M. Griffin and J. Barnes. Oxford 1989, 120–50.

Miscellaneous

- Titus Lucretius Carus, On the nature of the universe, tr. Sir Ronald Melville, introduction by Don and Peta Fowler. New York: Oxford University Press 1999.
- Gian Biagio Conte: Latin Literature: A History, tr. Joseph B. Solodow, rev. Don Fowler and Glenn W. Most. Baltimore & London: The Johns Hopkins University Press, 1994 (review by Peter Davis, in: Scholia Reviews ns 5 (1996) 3)
