= Gian Biagio Conte =

Italian philologist

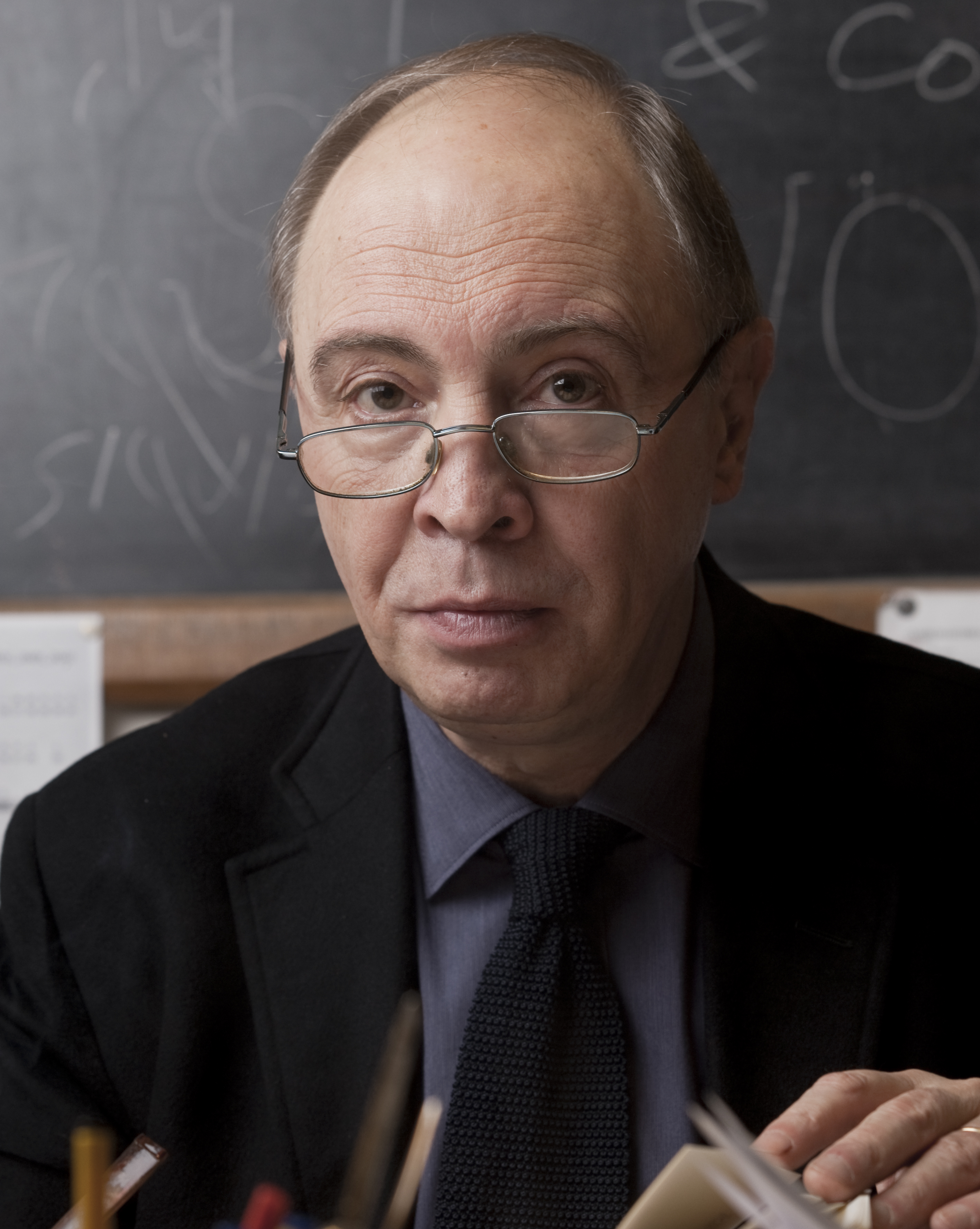
Gian Biagio Conte in 2009

Gian Biagio Conte (born 1941 in La Spezia) is an Italian classicist and professor of Latin Literature at the Scuola Normale Superiore of Pisa.

== Life ==
Conte completed his studies in classical philology at the Scuola Normale Superiore of Pisa, where he was influenced by scholars such as Antonio La Penna, Sebastiano Timpanaro and Alfonso Traina. In particular, with the first of these, he first had a fruitful period of collaboration, but then broke contact abruptly in an exchange of letters. Conte also went abroad to study in Munich with Friedrich Klingner and in Paris. At the age of 30, he was made professor of Latin Literature at the University of Siena, later at the University of Pisa and finally, in 2001, at the Scuola Normale Superiore. He enjoys high esteem outside Italy, in particular in the Anglosphere, where he has been invited as guest professor to Oxford, Cambridge, Princeton, Berkeley, and Stanford. In 2007, he ran for the office of director of the Scuola Normale Superiore, but was second to the preceding director Salvatore Settis, who received his third mandate in succession. In 2014 he was elected a Corresponding Fellow of the British Academy.

== Work ==
Conte confines his work basically to Latin literature, mainly to the poetry of the late republic, the Augustan period, and the early empire (Virgil, Lucan, Catullus, the elegiacs, Ovid, Lucretius), but also works on prose writers such as Pliny the Elder and on the novel of Petronius. Conte's approach to Latin literature is characterized by a combination of traditional philology and the innovations of literary theory of the 1970s, in particular structuralism. In his most successful pieces of work, for the most part articles which he later put together to form thematic volumes, Conte breaks with Croce's historicism and develops the concept of a literary system and of genre based on codes. Conte's approach has been picked up in the last thirty years, in particular in the Anglo-Saxon world and successfully elaborated in combination with the theory of intertextuality. Conte has published a Teubner edition of Virgil's Aeneid and continues working, together with a group of researchers and students, on a commentary to go with it, on a commentary on the Satyrica of Petronius and on allegory as a literary and hermeneutical form.

Conte is co-founder and director of the periodical Materiali e discussioni per l'analisi dei testi classici as well as a regular member of the Accademia Nazionale Virgiliana in Mantua.

Amongst his students are Alessandro Schiesaro, Alessandro Barchiesi, Rolando Ferri, Sergio Casali.

== Selected writings ==
Books and collections of articles

- Memoria dei poeti e sistema letterario, Einaudi, Torino, 1974, 2nd ed. 1985 (engl. The Rhetoric of Imitation, tr. Glenn W. Most, Cornell U. P. Ithaca/London 1987).
- Virgilio: il genere e i suoi confini, Garzanti, Milano, 1984.
- Letteratura latina: manuale storico dalle origini alla fine dell'impero romano, Le Monnier, Firenze, 1987, 2nd ed. 1989, 3rd enl. ed. 1993 (engl. Latin Literature: A History, tr. Joseph B. Solodow, rev. Don Fowler and Glenn W. Most. Baltimore & London: The Johns Hopkins University Press, 1994 (rev. Peter Davis, Scholia Reviews ns 5 (1996) 3).
- Generi e Lettori: saggi su Lucrezio, l'elegia d'amore, l'enciclopedia di Plinio, Mondadori, Milano, 1991 (engl. Genres and Readers, tr. Glenn W. Most, Johns Hopkins U.P., Baltimore).
- L'Autore nascosto: Un'interpretazione del Satyricon di Petronio, Il Mulino, Bologna, 1997 (engl. The Hidden Author, California University Press, 1996).
- (with E. Pianezzola und G. Ranucci) Il Dizionario della Lingua Latina, Le Monnier, Firenze, 2000
- Virgilio: l'epica del sentimento, Einaudi, Torino, 2002.
- The Poetry of Pathos: Studies in Virgilian Epic. Ed. by S. J. Harrison. Oxford: Oxford University Press, 2007. ISBN 0-19-928701-5.

Critical editions

- P. Vergilius Maro, Aeneis, ed. Gian Biagio Conte (Bibliotheca scriptorum Graecorum et Romanorum Teubneriana), Berlin, New York: Walter de Gruyter, 2009. ISBN 978-3-11-019607-8.
