= Pepi Merisio =

Italian photographer (1931–2021)

- Born: Giuseppe Merisio; 1931; Caravaggio, Kingdom of Italy
- Died: 3 February 2021 (aged 89–90); Bergamo, Italy
- Occupations: Photographer, photoreporter

Giuseppe Merisio, known as Pepi Merisio (1931 – 3 February 2021), was an Italian photographer and photojournalist.

== Biography ==
Merisio was one of the most prestigious photographers in Italy. He gained notoriety in the 1950s for his contributions to Famiglia Cristiana, Stern, and Paris Match. He officially became a professional photographer in 1962 when he began collaborating with Epoca and worked with Pope Paul VI in the segment Una giornata col Papa.

In 1979, Merisio compiled a black and white photoshoot, which was then held at the Polaroid Collection in Boston. In 1988, he was nominated by the Federazione italiana associazioni fotografiche to a Master of Italian Photography and dedicated a monograph to him nine years later. In 1989, alongside Gianni Berengo Gardin, he represented Italy at the 75th anniversary of the Leica.

Pepi Merisio died in Bergamo on 3 February 2021 at the age of 90, a few days after his birthday.
