= Materiali e discussioni per l'analisi dei testi classici =

- Discipline: Classics
- Language: English

Publication details
- Publisher: Fabrizio Serra Editore

Standard abbreviations
- ISO 4: Mater. Discuss. Anal. Testi Class.

Indexing
- ISSN: 0392-6338 (print); 1724-1693 (web)
- OCLC no.: 60628437

Links
- Journal homepage

Materiali e discussioni per l'analisi dei testi classici (often abbreviated to MD; 'Materials and discussions for the analysis of classical texts') is an Italian periodical within the realm of classical philology founded in 1978.

The periodical serves as a forum for exchange on different methodological approaches to ancient literature confronting historical-philological method and modern literary theory and investigating the language of culture as well as forms and techniques of literary communication.

MD was founded by a group of scholars around the editor Gian Biagio Conte in Pisa in 1978. The editor is helped by an international scientific advisory board, to which belong: Alessandro Barchiesi, Maurizio Bettini, Maria Grazia Bonnanno, Mario Citroni, Marco Fantuzzi, R. Elaine Fantham, Rolando Ferri, Philip Hardie, Richard L. Hunter, Mario Labate, Glenn W. Most, Michael D. Reeve, Gianpiero Rosati, Luigi Enrico Rossi, Richard J. Tarrant. Publications are peer-reviewed.

The periodical appears twice a year at Fabrizio Serra editore in Pisa (ISSN 0392-6338). From issue 49, 2002 onwards, it also appears in electronic guise (ISSN elettronico 1724-1693). In 2009, a volume of indices was published for volumes 1, 1978 to 60, 2008.

The periodical is accompanied by a book series Biblioteca di ‘Materiali e discussioni per l'analisi dei testi classici’ edited by Maurizio Bettini and Gian Biagio Conte. It accepts philological and critical monographs which may vary in their approach to ancient literature, but are supposed to give a problematized framework of the analysis of their given text and to foster the development of critical instruments. So far, 20 volumes have been published.
