= Early Popular Visual Culture =

- Discipline: Visual arts
- Language: English
- Edited by: Simon Popple, Vanessa Toulmin

Publication details
- Publisher: Routledge (United Kingdom)
- Frequency: Quarterly

Standard abbreviations
- ISO 4: Early Pop. Vis. Cult.

Indexing
- ISSN: 1746-0654 (print); 1746-0662 (web)

Links
- Journal homepage

Early Popular Visual Culture is a peer-reviewed academic journal published quarterly by Routledge, which focuses on the study of the visual arts prior to 1930.
