= Maurizio Bettini =

Italian philologist, anthropologist and novelist

Maurizio Bettini (born 24 July 1947) is an Italian philologist, anthropologist and novelist. He is a professor of classical philology at the University of Siena and director of Siena's Centre for the Study of Anthropology and the Ancient World.

== Biography ==
Maurizio Bettini received his laurea in classical languages from the University of Pisa in 1970. His academic career has focused on the study of ancient Greek and Latin culture. He was a professore incaricato of Greek and Latin grammar at the University of Pisa from 1975 to 1980, professore straordinario of Latin literature at the Ca' Foscari University of Venice from 1981 to 1984, and is a full professor of Greek and Latin philology at the University of Siena since 1985. He was the dean of Siena's faculty of literature and philosophy from 1986 to 1995. In 1986 he co-founded Siena's Centre for the Study of Anthropology and the Ancient World, of which he remains the director.

Since 1992, he has been a recurring visiting professor at the Classics Department of the University of California, Berkeley. He has also been a visiting professor at other universities in the United States, France, Canada, Switzerland, Japan, Israel, China and the United Kingdom.

For his novel Le coccinelle di Redún, he was awarded the Mondello Prize in 2004. In 2013 he was awarded the Mondello Prize for Literary Criticism for his book Vertere. Un'antropologia della traduzione nella cultura antica.

== Selected bibliography ==
=== Works in English translation ===
- Anthropology and Roman culture: kinship, time, images of the soul, translated by John Van Sickle, Baltimore: Johns Hopkins University Press, 1991, ISBN 9780801841040.
- The portrait of the lover, translated by Laura Gibbs, Berkeley: University of California Press, 1999, ISBN 9780520208506.
- Classical indiscretions: a millennial enquiry into the state of the classics, translated by John McManamon, London: Duckworth, 2001, ISBN 9780715629703.
- The ears of Hermes: communication, images, and identity in the classical world, translation by William Michael Short, Columbus: Ohio State University Press, 2011, ISBN 9780814211700.
- Women & weasels: mythologies of birth in ancient Greece and Rome, translated by Emlyn Eisenach, Chicago: University of Chicago Press, 2013, ISBN 9780226044743.
- The world through Roman eyes: anthropological approaches to ancient culture (editor), translated by William Michael Short, Cambridge: Cambridge University Press, 2018, ISBN 9781107157613.
- In Praise of Polytheism, translated by Douglas Grant Heise, Oakland, California: University of California Press, 2023, ISBN 978-0-520-34224-8.
