= Jacqueline Fabre-Serris =

French classical scholar

Professor Jacqueline Fabre-Serris
- Born: 23 February 1954, Marseille, France

Academic background
- Education: University Paris IV-Sorbonne
- Thesis: Mythe et poésie dans les Métamorphoses d'Ovide. Fonctions et significations de la mythologie dans la Rome augustéenne
- Doctoral advisor: Jean-Pierre Néraudau

Academic work
- Discipline: Classics
- Sub-discipline: Latin Literature; Classical reception studies
- Institutions: Université Charles-de-Gaulle Lille
- Notable works: Mythe et poésie dans les Métamorphoses d'Ovide. Fonctions et significations de la mythologiedans la Rome augustéenne, Klincksieck, Paris, 1995

Jacqueline Fabre-Serris is a French classical scholar, who is known for her work on Ovid, mythography, classical reception, and gender studies. She is Professeure des Universités of Latin Literature at the Charles de Gaulle University – Lille III.

== Career ==
Fabre-Serris was educated at École Normale Supérieure de Fontenay-aux-Roses and completed her first doctoral degree at the University of Provence in 1984 on the reception of classical texts in Cesare Pavese's Dialoghi con Leucò. She completed a second doctoral degree at the University Paris IV-Sorbonne (supervisor: Jean-Pierre Néraudau) in 1992 on Ovid's Metamorphoses, which she published in 1995. After teaching at University Paris III, University Paris IV, and the University of Provence, she joined Charles de Gaulle University – Lille III as an associate professor in 1991, before becoming Professor of Latin Literature in 1998.

Fabre-Serris is a member of the Council of the department “Humanities”. She is also co-editor of the academic journals "Dictynna", which publishes contributions on classical literature and culture, and "EuGeStA", which looks at Greco-Roman literature and society through a gendered lens. Among other scientific offices, she is in charge of the international network on “Augustan Poetry” and a member of the editorial committee "Savoirs et systèmes de pensée", an interdisciplinary project which collects studies from various fields across the Humanities: Fabre-Serris is in charge of the section on Mythography.

Fabre-Serris has worked extensively on Latin literature, ancient mythography, Ovid and the reception of ancient texts in modern literature. In the last decade, Fabre-Serris has focused more particularly on gender and Latin literature, contributing to the topic with articles, book chapters, and edited volumes.

== Select publications ==
- Mythe et poésie dans les Métamorphoses d'Ovide. Fonctions et significations de la mythologiedans la Rome augustéenne (Klincksieck, Paris 1995)
- Rome, l'Arcadie et la mer des Argonautes. Essai sur la naissance d'une mythologie des origines en Occident (Presses Universitaires du Septentrion, Lille 2008)
- (ed.) Women and War in Antiquity (Johns Hopkins University Press, Baltimore, 2015)
- "Un exemple de sélection, ordre et traitement mythographique chez Hygin: les fables 1–27", Polymnia 3, 2017, 26–52
- "Sulpicia, Gallus et les élégiaques. Propositions de lecture de l'épigramme 3.13" Eugesta 7, 2017, 115–139
- "Genre et Gender: usages et enjeux de l’emploi de durus chez les élégiaques", Eugesta 3, 2013, 209–309
- "Desire and Rape in the Feminine:The Tales of Echo and Salmacis: An Ovidian Answer to Propertius 1.20?", Helios 46.2, 2018, 127-144
- maximum Thebis (Romae?) scelus/maternus amor est (Oed. 629-30): Amour de la mère et inceste chez Sénèque in 'Maternal Conceptions in Classical Literature and Philosophy' A. Sharrock and A. Keith (eds) (Toronto University Press, Toronto, 2020)
