= Centre culturel international de Cerisy-la-Salle =

Coordinates: 49°01′19″N 1°17′19″W

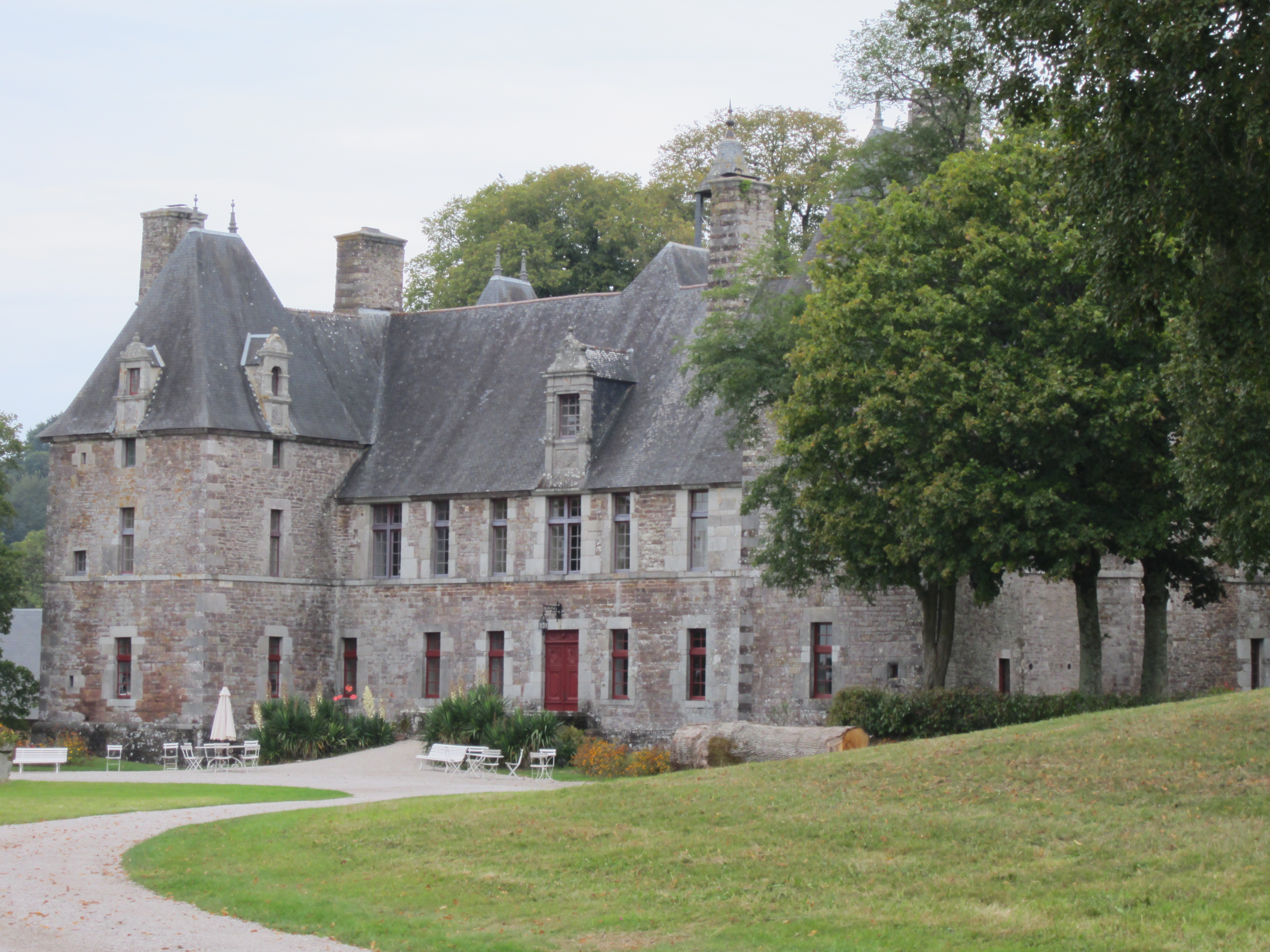
Château de Cerisy, Manche, Normandy

The Château de Cerisy-la-Salle, located in the French commune of Cerisy-la-Salle (in the Manche département, region of Normandy), hosts the Centre culturel international de Cerisy-la-Salle (CCIC), a prestigious venue for intellectual and scholarly encounters founded in 1952 by Anne Heurgon-Desjardins. The center is the home of the famous Colloques de Cerisy ("Cerisy Conferences"), a series of seminars which constitute an important reference in the recent history of French intellectual life. The expression "Colloque de Cerisy" also refers to the proceedings of these seminars, which are available from various publishers.

== History ==
It all started with Paul Desjardins and the "Pontigny Decades" at Pontigny Abbey in Burgundy, from 1910-1939. He gathered prominent figures there to discuss artistic, literary, philosophical, political, and social themes. In the interwar period, Desjardins and his daughter, Anne Heurgon-Desjardins, sold Pontigny Abbey in order to restore the damaged Château de Cerisy la Salle. The Cerisy Cultural Center, supported by the Association des Amis de Pontigny-Cerisy, was born in 1952. In 1972, the Association des Amis Pontigny-Cerisy became a public benefit organization with approximately 1200 members, a board of twenty directors, and an honorary committee composed of prominent intellectual figures.

== Colloquia ==
The Colloques de Cerisy are organized annually in the month of July. Since 1952, nearly 1,000 symposia and 700 publications have been organised in Cerisy, dealing with various fields of the social sciences, medicine, and the arts.

== See also ==
- Éditions Hermann
