= Latin literature =

Latin literature includes the essays, histories, poems, plays, and other writings written in the Latin language. The beginning of formal Latin literature dates to 240 BC, when the first stage play in Latin was performed in Atella, a town in Campania south of Rome. Latin literature flourished for the next six centuries. The classical era of Latin literature can be roughly divided into several periods: early Latin literature, the golden age, the imperial period and Late Antiquity.

Latin was the language of the ancient Romans as well as being the lingua franca of Western and Central Europe throughout the Middle Ages. Latin literature features the work of Roman authors, such as Cicero, Virgil, Ovid and Horace, but also includes the work of European writers after the fall of the Empire, from religious writers like Thomas Aquinas (1225–1274) to secular writers like Francis Bacon (1561–1626), Baruch Spinoza (1632–1677), and Isaac Newton (1642–1727).

== History ==
=== Early Latin literature ===
Although literature in Latin followed a continual development over several centuries, the beginnings of formal Latin literature started with the regular performance of comedies and tragedies in Rome in 240 BC, one year after the conclusion of the First Punic War. These initial comedies and tragedies were adapted from Greek drama by Livius Andronicus, a Greek prisoner of war who had been brought to Rome as a slave in 272 BC. Andronicus translated Homer's Odyssey into Latin using a traditional Latin verse form called Saturnian meter. In 235 BC, Gnaeus Naevius, a Roman citizen, continued this tradition of producing dramas that were reworkings of Greek originals, or fabula palliata, and he expanded on this by producing a new type of drama, fabula praetexta, or tragedies based on Roman myths and history, starting in 222 BC. Later in life, Naevius composed an epic poem in Saturnian meter on the first Punic War, in which he had fought.

Other epic poets followed Naevius. Quintus Ennius wrote an historical epic, the Annals (soon after 200 BC), describing Roman history from the founding of Rome to his own time. He adopted the Greek dactylic hexameter, which became the standard verse form for Roman epics. He became well known for his tragic dramas. Successors in this field include Marcus Pacuvius and Lucius Accius. These three writers rarely used episodes from Roman history, but they wrote Latin versions of tragic themes that the Greeks had already written about. Even when they copied the Greeks, their translations were not straightforward replicas of the original Greek works. Only fragments of their plays have survived.

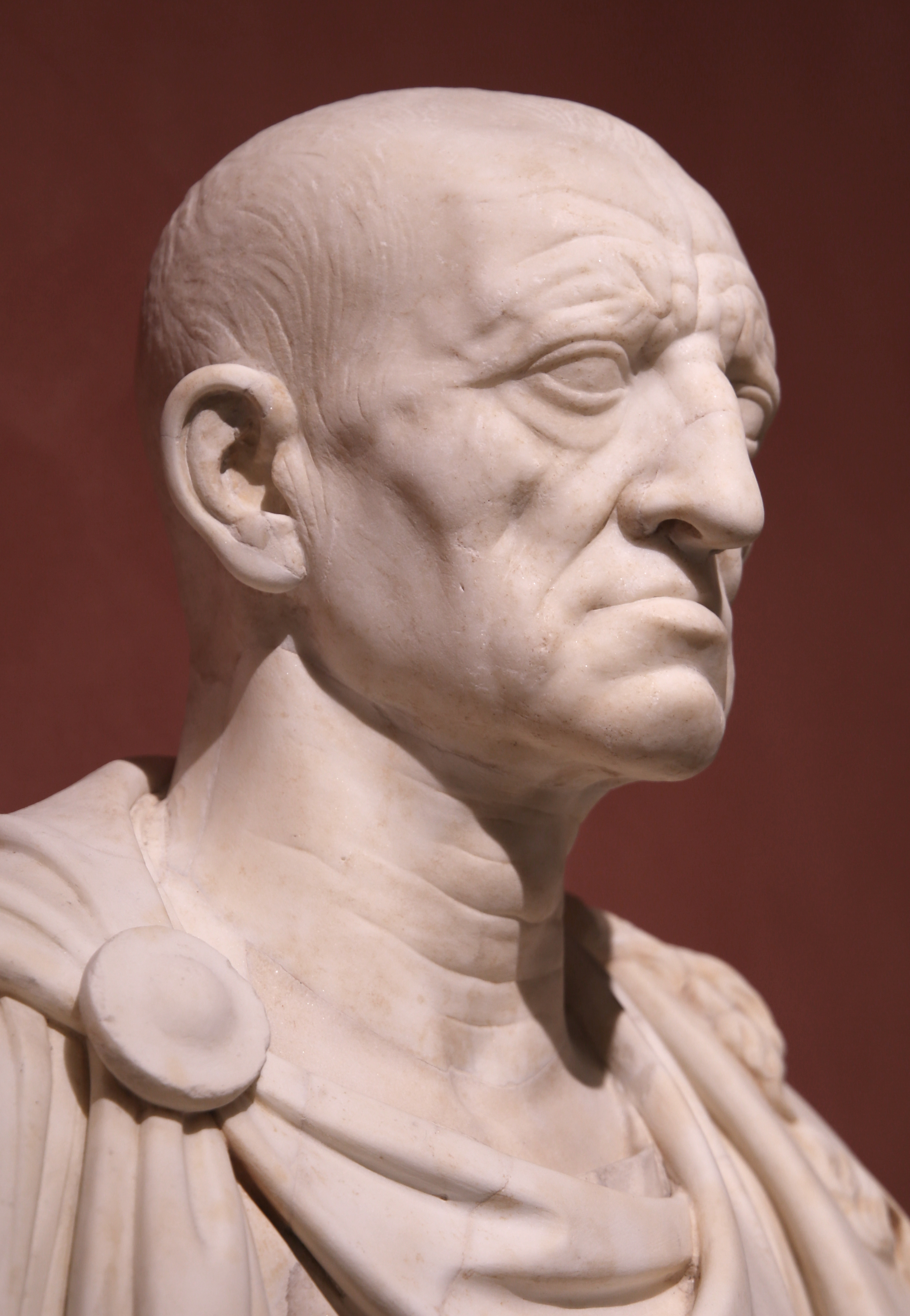
Cato the Elder

Considerably more is known about early Latin comedy, as 26 Early Latin comedies are extant – 20 of which were written by Plautus; the remaining six were written by Terence. These men modeled their comedies on Greek plays known as New Comedy, but treated the plots and wording of the originals freely. Plautus scattered songs throughout his plays and added to the humor with puns and wisecracks, as well as comic actions by the actors. Terence's plays were more austere in tone, dealing with domestic situations. His works provided the chief inspiration for French and English comedies of the 17th century AD.

The prose of the period is best known through On Agriculture (160 BC) by Cato the Elder. Cato wrote the first Latin history of Rome and of other Italian cities. He was the first Roman statesman to put his political speeches in writing as a means of influencing public opinion.

Early Latin literature ended with Gaius Lucilius, who created a new kind of poetry in his 30 books of Satires (2nd century BC). He wrote in an easy, conversational tone about books, food, friends, and current events.

=== The golden age ===
Traditionally, the height of Latin literature has been assigned to the period from 81 BC to AD 17, although recent scholarship has questioned the assumptions that privileged the works of this period over both earlier and later works. This period is usually said to have begun with the first known speech of Cicero and ended with the death of Ovid.

==== The age of Cicero ====
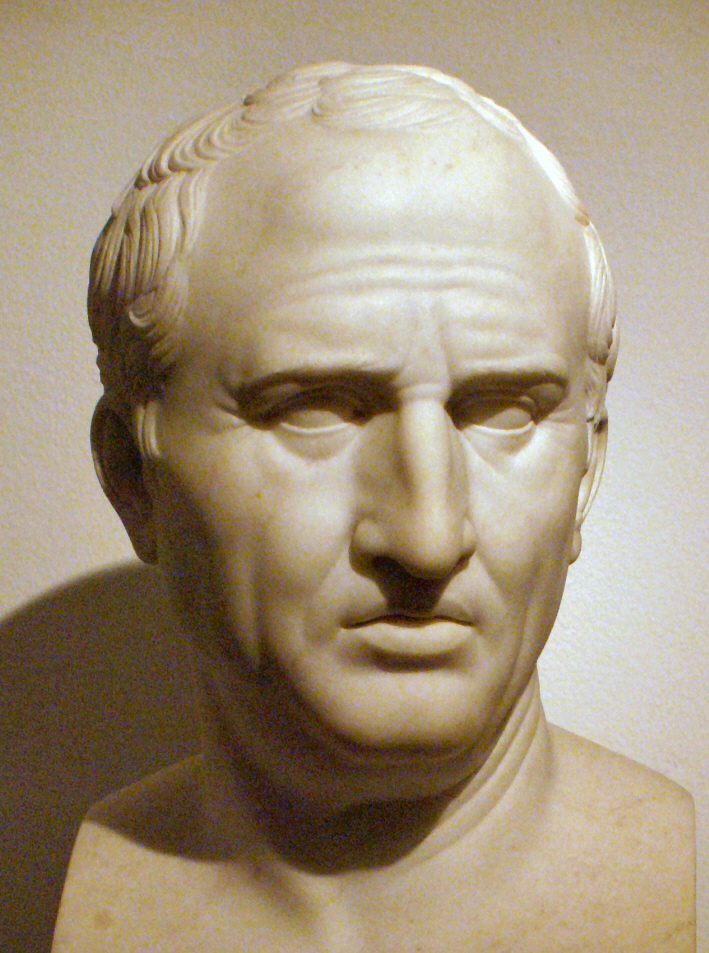
Cicero

Cicero has traditionally been considered the master of Latin prose. The writing he produced from about 80 BC until his death in 43 BC exceeds that of any Latin author whose work survives in terms of quantity and variety of genre and subject matter, as well as possessing unsurpassed stylistic excellence. Cicero's many works can be divided into four groups: (1) letters, (2) rhetorical treatises, (3) philosophical works, and (4) orations. His letters provide detailed information about an important period in Roman history and offer a vivid picture of the public and private life among the Roman governing class. Cicero's works on oratory are our most valuable Latin sources for ancient theories on education and rhetoric. His philosophical works were the basis of moral philosophy during the Middle Ages. His speeches inspired many European political leaders and the founders of the United States.

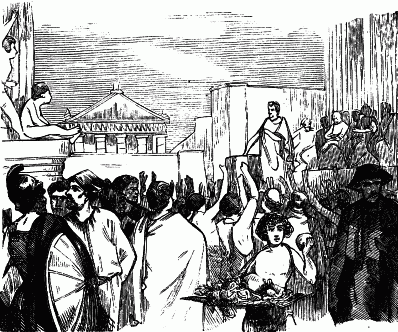
Roman orator

Julius Caesar and Sallust were significant historical writers of Cicero's time. Caesar wrote commentaries on the Gallic and civil wars in a straightforward style to justify his actions as a general. He wrote descriptions of people and their motives.

The birth of lyric poetry in Latin occurred during the same period. The lyrics of Catullus, whom the writer Aulus Gellius called "the most elegant of poets", are noted for their emotional intensity. Contemporary with Catullus, Lucretius expounded the Epicurean philosophy in a long poem, De rerum natura.

One of the most prolific writers of the period was Marcus Terentius Varro. Referred to as "the most learned of the Romans" by Quintillian, he wrote about a remarkable variety of subjects, from religion to poetry, but only his writings on agriculture and the Latin language are extant in their complete form.

==== The Augustan age ====
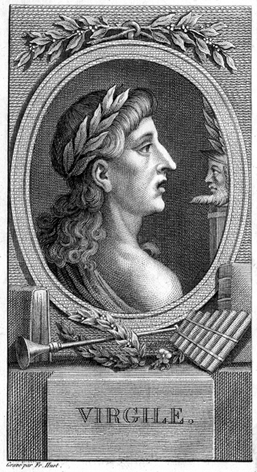
Virgil

The emperor Augustus took a personal interest in the literary works produced during his years of power from 27 BC to AD 14. This period is sometimes called the Augustan Age of Latin Literature. Virgil published his pastoral Eclogues, the Georgics, and the Aeneid, an epic poem describing the events that led to the creation of Rome. Virgil told how the Trojan hero Aeneas became the ancestor of the Roman people. Virgil provided divine justification for Roman rule over the world. Although Virgil died before he could finish the poem, it was soon regarded as the greatest work of Latin literature.

Virgil's friend Horace wrote Epodes, Odes, Satires, and Epistles. The perfection of the Odes in content, form, and style has charmed readers for hundreds of years. The Satires and Epistles discuss ethical and literary problems in an urbane, witty manner. Horace's Art of Poetry, probably published as a separate work, greatly influenced later poetic theories. It stated the basic rules of classical writing as the Romans understood and used them. After Virgil died, Horace was Rome's leading poet.

The Latin elegy reached its highest development in the works of Tibullus, Propertius, and Ovid. Most of this poetry is concerned with love. Ovid wrote the Fasti, which describes Roman festivals and their legendary origins. Ovid's greatest work, the Metamorphoses, weaves various myths into a fast-paced, fascinating story. Ovid was a witty writer who excelled in creating lively and passionate characters. The Metamorphoses was the best-known source of Greek and Roman mythology throughout the Middle Ages and the Renaissance. It inspired many poets, painters, and composers.

One of the few female poets of ancient Rome whose work has survived is Sulpicia.

In prose, Livy produced a history of the Roman people in 142 books. Only 35 survived, but they are a major source of information on Rome.

=== The imperial period ===
From the death of Augustus in AD 14 until about 200, Roman authors emphasized style and tried new and startling ways of expression. During the reign of Nero from 54 to 68, the Stoic philosopher Seneca wrote a number of dialogues and letters on such moral themes as mercy and generosity. In his Natural Questions, Seneca analyzed earthquakes, floods, and storms. Seneca's tragedies greatly influenced the growth of tragic drama in Europe. His nephew Lucan wrote the Pharsalia (about 60), an epic poem describing the civil war between Caesar and Pompey. The Satyricon (about 60) by Petronius was the first picaresque Latin novel. Only fragments of the complete work survive. It describes the adventures of various low-class characters in absurd, extravagant, and dangerous situations, often in the world of petty crime.

Epic poems included the Argonautica of Gaius Valerius Flaccus, following the story of Jason and the Argonauts in their quest for the Golden Fleece, the Thebaid of Statius, following the conflict of Oedipus's sons and the Seven Against Thebes, and the Punica of Silius Italicus, following the Second Punic War and the invasions of Hannibal into Italy. At the hands of Martial, the epigram achieved the stinging quality still associated with it. Juvenal satirized vice.

The historian Tacitus painted a dark picture of the early empire in his Histories and Annals, both written in the early 2nd century. His contemporary Suetonius wrote biographies of the 12 Roman rulers from Julius Caesar through Domitian. The letters of Pliny the Younger described Roman life of the period. Quintilian composed the most complete work on ancient education that we possess. Important works from the 2nd century include the Attic Nights of Aulus Gellius, a collection of anecdotes and reports of literary discussions among his friends; and the letters of the orator Marcus Cornelius Fronto to Marcus Aurelius. The most famous work of the period was Metamorphoses, also called The Golden Ass, by Apuleius. This novel concerns a young man who is accidentally changed into a donkey. The story is filled with tales of love and witchcraft.

=== Latin in the Middle Ages, Renaissance, and Early Modernity ===
Pagan Latin literature showed a final burst of vitality from the late 3rd century till the 5th centuries – Ammianus Marcellinus in history, Quintus Aurelius Symmachus in oratory, and Ausonius and Rutilius Claudius Namatianus in poetry. The Mosella by Ausonius demonstrated a modernism of feeling that indicates the end of classical literature as such.

Writers who laid the foundations of Christian Latin literature during the 4th century and 5th century included the church fathers Augustine of Hippo, Jerome, and Ambrose, and the first great Christian poet, Prudentius. Some Latin writing by Christian women also survives: the prison diary of the martyr Perpetua of Carthage, and an account of a Christian pilgrimage by the pilgrim Egeria.

During the Early Middle Ages, there was a noted literary activity in the Carolingian Empire, mostly in modern-day France, characterized as the Carolingian Renaissance, and some 80 Latin-language writers from this period have been covered in the Clavis Scriptorum Latinorum Medii Aevi published by Brepols. The High Middle Ages would be characterized by a renewal of Latin literature and with Scholasticism Latin would find a new philosophical expression.

During the Renaissance there was a return to the Latin of classical times, called for this reason Neo-Latin. This purified language continued to be used as the lingua franca among the learned throughout Europe, with the great works of Descartes, Francis Bacon, and Baruch Spinoza all being composed in Latin. Among the last important books written primarily in Latin prose were the works of Swedenborg (d. 1772), Linnaeus (d. 1778), Euler (d. 1783), Gauss (d. 1855), and Isaac Newton (d. 1727), and Latin remains a necessary skill for modern readers of great early modern works of linguistics, literature, and philosophy.

==== Great Britain and Ireland ====
The Handlist of the Latin Writers of Great Britain and Ireland before 1540, published by Brepols, contains the names of some 2,000 Latin-language writers originating from modern-day England, Ireland, Scotland and Wales, covering a period from the 5th century to the 16th.

Several of the leading pre-modern English poets wrote in Latin as well as English. Milton's 1645 Poems are one example, but there were also Thomas Campion, George Herbert and Milton's colleague Andrew Marvell. Some indeed wrote chiefly in Latin and were valued for the elegance and Classicism of their style. Examples of these were Anthony Alsop and Vincent Bourne, who were noted for the ingenious way that they adapted their verse to describing details of life in the 18th century while never departing from the purity of Latin diction. One of the last to be noted for the quality of his Latin verse well into the 19th century was Walter Savage Landor.

== Characteristics ==
Much Latin writing reflects the Romans' interest in rhetoric, the art of speaking and persuading. Public speaking had great importance for educated Romans because most of them wanted successful political careers. When Rome was a republic, effective speaking often determined who would be elected or what bills would pass. After Rome became an empire, the ability to impress and persuade people by the spoken word lost much of its importance. But training in rhetoric continued to flourish and to affect styles of writing. A large part of rhetoric consists of the ability to present a familiar idea in a striking new manner that attracts attention. Latin authors became masters of this art of variety.

=== Language and form ===
Latin is a highly inflected language, with many grammatical forms for various words. As a result, it can be used with a pithiness and brevity unknown in English. It lends itself to elaboration, because its tight syntax holds even the longest and most complex sentence together as a logical unit. Latin can be used with conciseness, as in the works of Sallust and Tacitus. Or it can have wide, sweeping phrases, as in the works of Livy and the speeches of Cicero.

Latin lacks the poetic vocabulary of Greek. Some earlier Roman poets tried to make up for this deficiency by creating new compound words, as the Greeks had done; nevertheless, Roman writers seldom invented words. Except in epic poetry, they tended to use familiar vocabulary, giving it poetic value by combinations of words and by rich sound effects. Rome's leading poets had great technical skill in the choice and arrangement of language. They had an intimate knowledge of the Greek poets, whose themes appear in almost all Roman literature.

== See also ==
- Medieval Latin
- Renaissance Latin
- Neo-Latin
- Contemporary Latin
- Prosody (Latin)
- Clausula (rhetoric)
- Alliteration (Latin)

== Sources ==
- Fantham, Elaine. "Latin literature." World Book Advanced. World Book, 2011. Web. 18 October 2011.
