= E. H. Warmington =

British professor of classics (1898–1987)

Eric Herbert (E. H.) Warmington, MA, FRHistS (15 March 1898 – 8 June 1987) was a British classicist, internationally known for his Latin translations.

== Education ==
Eric attended The Perse School, Cambridge and won a scholarship to Peterhouse, Cambridge. He graduated with a Double First in Classics, as well as winning the Le Bas English Prize.

== Life and career ==
He became a Reader in Ancient History at King's College London in 1925, and was appointed Professor of Classics at Birkbeck, University of London in 1936. He served as Vice-Master of Birkbeck from 1954. He was also acting Master of Birkbeck in 1950–1951 and 1965–1966.

He produced numerous works, often with other scholars, over many decades of the twentieth century. He also edited other translations, including the Greek–English translation of Aelian's On the Characteristics of Animals. His most famous work is the series Remains of Old Latin, a four-volume edition of early Latin texts for the Loeb Classical Library, with a facing English translation.

1. Remains of Old Latin I: Ennius and Caecilius (1935, revised 1956; ISBN 0-674-99324-1)
2. Remains of Old Latin II: Livius Andronicus, Naevius, Pacuvius and Accius (1936; ISBN 0-674-99347-0)
3. Remains of Old Latin III: Lucilius and The Twelve Tables (1938, revised 1967; ISBN 0-674-99363-2)
4. Remains of Old Latin IV: Archaic inscriptions (1940; ISBN 0-674-99396-9)

Professor Warmington also acquired a reputation as an ornithologist. He spent much of his free time studying the birds of northwest London (where he lived on Flower Lane, Mill Hill) and the nearby Brent Reservoir. In 1989 his contribution to the local study of natural history was recognised in a display panel placed in Scratchwood Country Park by the Mill Hill Historical Society.

He was the father of ancient historian Brian Herbert Warmington.

== Other publications ==
As well as Remains of Old Latin (see above), Warmington published:

- The Commerce between the Roman Empire and India. (1928)
- Greek Geography. (1934)
- Africa in Ancient and Medieval Times. (1936)
- A history of Birkbeck College, University of London, during the Second World War, 1939-1945. (1954)
- The Ancient Explorers (with Prof. Max Cary: 1963)
