= Fabula crepidata =

Genre of Latin tragedy

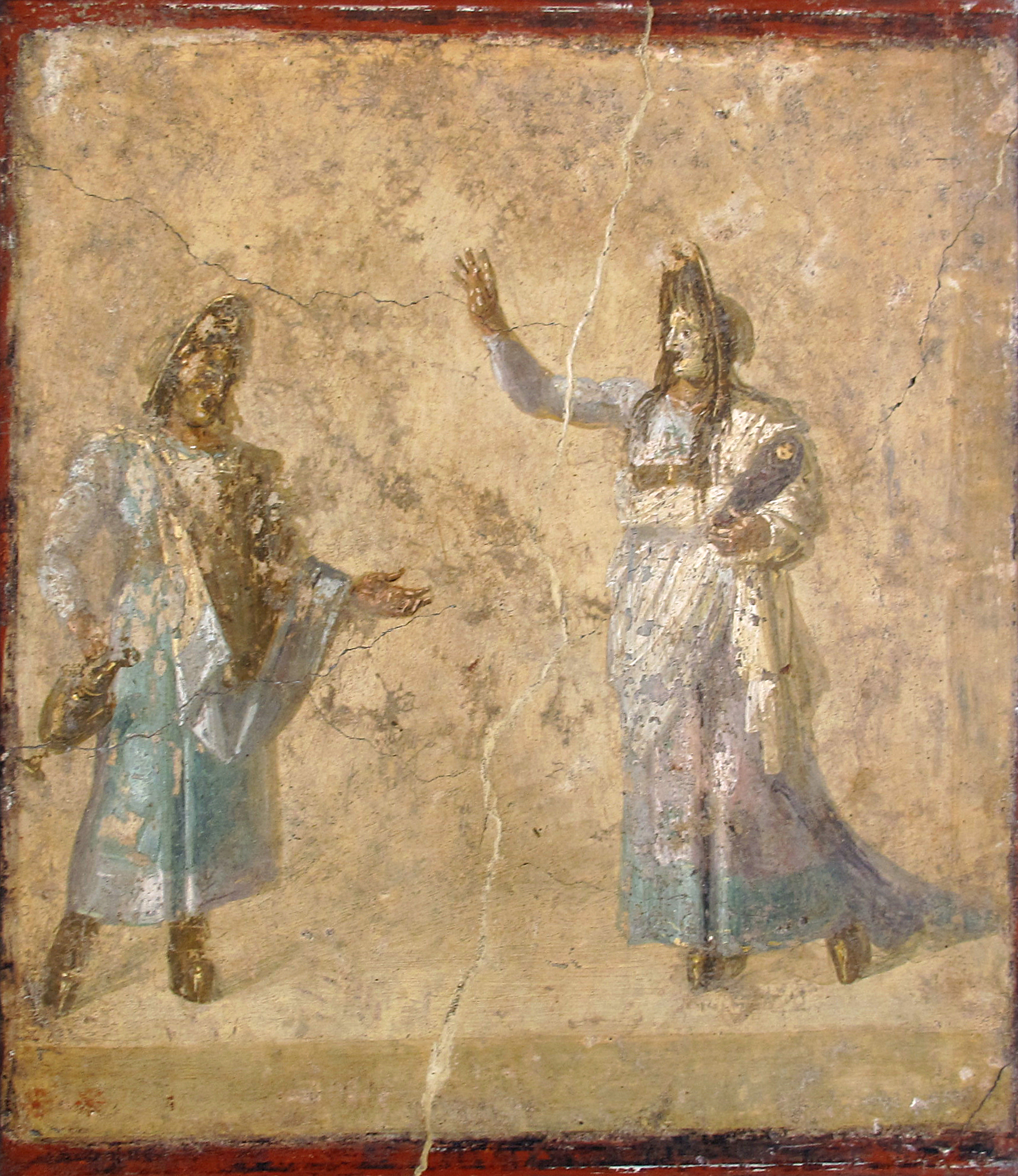
Actors in masks, depicted in a fresco at the House of the Dioscuri (Pompeii, 1st century AD), possibly performing the Greek myth of Telephus and Auge.

A fabula crepidata or fabula cothurnata ('story/play in Greek boots', referring to the crepida and cothurnus) is a Latin tragedy with Greek subjects. The genre originated in adaptations of Greek tragedy beginning in the early third century BC. Only nine have survived intact, all by Seneca. Of the plays written by Lucius Livius Andronicus, Gnaeus Naevius, Quintus Ennius, Marcus Pacuvius, Lucius Accius, and others, only titles, small fragments, and occasionally brief summaries are left. Ovid's Medea also did not survive.

== See also ==
- Fabula atellana
- Fabula palliata
- Fabula praetexta
- Fabula saltata
- Fabula togata
- Theatre of ancient Rome

== Sources ==
- Bernhard Zimmermann and Thomas Baier "Tragedy" in: Brill's New Pauly, Antiquity volumes edited by: Hubert Cancik and Helmuth Schneider. Consulted online on 21 July 2017
