= Carmen Priami =

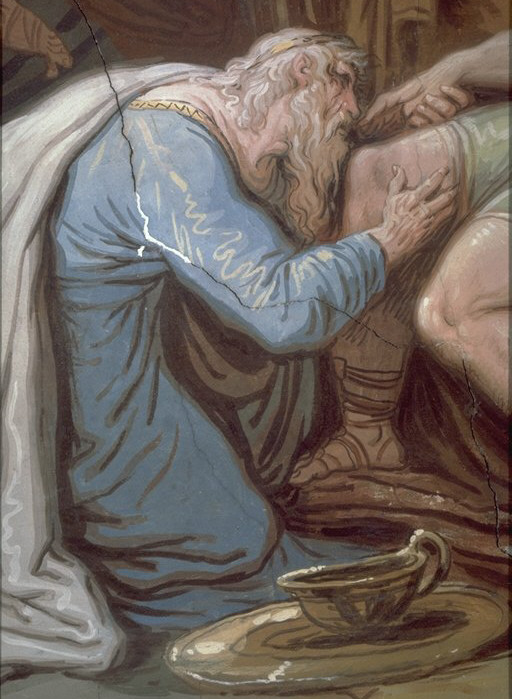
Felice Giani's Neoclassical depiction of Priam at the knees of Achilles, begging for the release of his son's body for burial

The Carmen Priami ("Priam's Song") is a lost Latin poem known from the quotation of a single line by Varro. The unknown poet, "a remarkable reactionary," rejects the Hellenizing trend in Latin poetry led by Ennius (c. 239 – c. 169 BC) and adopts a deliberately archaic style, invoking the Camenae:

veterēs Casmenās cascam rem volō prōfārī. (I desire the Camenae of old to chant an ancient tale.)

The invocation of the Muse is a convention of Greco-Roman poetry, and Ennius announced his intention to leave behind the rusticity of native poetic traditions and embrace the sophistication of the Greeks with service to the Muses. His immediate predecessors Livius and Naevius had asserted their place among traditional Roman poets, or vates, by continuing to invoke instead the Camenae, a group of goddesses, varying in number, who were associated with fresh-water springs, or fontes, and thus metaphorically "sources" of inspiration. These were attributes also of the Muses, and while the Camenae never lost their Roman character, they became increasingly identified with their Greek counterparts.

The poet of the Carmen Priami uses artificially archaic language. The line was composed in the Saturnian meter, which had ceased to be used and which the poet misunderstands, misplacing the caesura. "The motive for such a use," notes literary historian Gian Biagio Conte, "could only be to lend substance to some intuition of primitive preliterary epic composition."

The poem is among the "countertendencies" in Latin literature that reveal Roman ambivalence toward the adoption of Greek culture.

== See also ==
- Carmina Convivalia
