= Achilles (Ennius) =

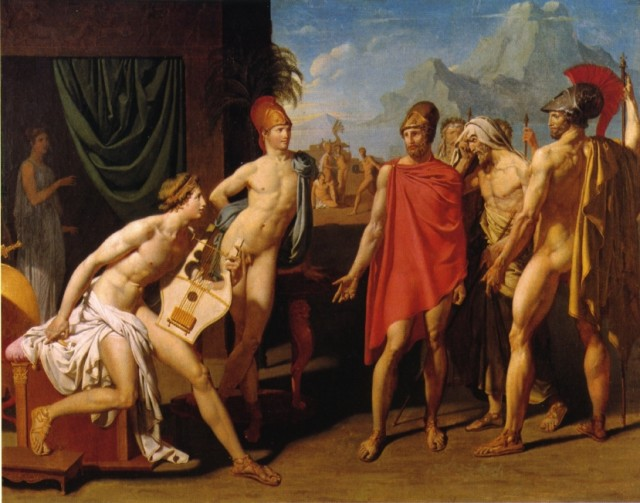
- The Ambassadors of Agamemnon in the tent of Achilles, an 1801 painting by Jean-Auguste-Dominique Ingres
- Original language: Old Latin
- Written by: Ennius
- Based on: Possibly the play Achilles by Aristarchus of Tegea
- First publication: c. 239 – c. 169 BCE, perhaps before c. 190 BCE
- Subject: attempt to convince Achilles to rejoin the Greek army during the Trojan War
- Genre: fabula crepidata

Achilles or Achilles Aristarchi is a tragedy by Ennius preserved in a select few fragments. It appears that the text described the attempts to convince Achilles to rejoin the Greek army after he had abandoned the fighting.

== Title ==
The alternative title Achilles Aristarchi ("Achilles of Aristarchus") appears in the prologue to Plautus's play Poenulus and also the works of Verrius Flaccus, as quoted by Festus. It is not entirely clear that this alternative title denotes the same play about Achilles by Ennius as the other mentions of Ennius's Achilles. If Plautus was, in fact, trying to describe a different play, then the specifier "of Aristarchus" ("Aristarchi") would perhaps serve to distinguish the work from the other Ennian play Achilles. Alternatively, the classicist H. D. Jocelyn suggests that the original source for this variant title was merely remembering or reading the didascaliae. In any case, whatever play Plautus was describing was itself presumably based on the tragedy Achilles authored by Aristarchus of Tegea. This Plautine reference also implies that this Ennian play was composed before c. 190 BCE.

== Fragments ==
One passage is possibly preserved in the works of Cicero, who writes "such great floods were being cast ashore" ("ita magni fluctus eiciebantur"), which—according to a later scholiast—was taken from the play Achilles. The stylistic features of this quote are unusual for Cicero, but common in works of Roman tragedy, namely that ita ("thus, so, it this way") is utilized as a causative participle and that the sentence is terminated by a word as long as eiciebantur ("to cast, throw"). The scholiast refers to this line as a hemistich, a detail that is—according to the classicist H. D. Jocelyn—inaccurate. Other scholiasts on Virgil make similar errors, and also mistakenly claim that certain passages are quotes from other authors of dramas, when they were in fact merely authored by Virgil in the style of other poems. Therefore, Jocelyn suggests that this particular scholiast on Cicero may have erroneously wrote that a fragment was quote from Ennius, when it was in fact created by Cicero in imitation of the language of Roman tragedy. It is possible that some storm sent by Apollo was a part of the plot of the Achilles, as Apollo—in the Iliad—causes Agamemnon to insult Achilles. Consequently, the scholiast may have noticed some parallel between the events of the Ennian play and this Ciceronian passage, and left a note, perhaps as an edited version of a previous, potentially more accurate comment left by a different scholiast.

One fragment preserved in the writings of Nonius Marcellus may contain dialogue intended to encourage Achilles—the passage reads "save the citizens, ward off the enemy, when you can ward off" ("serva cives, defende hostes, cum potes defendere"). Jocelyn notes that this passage relies on Roman cultural concepts rather than Greek ones, as Homeric heroes such as Achilles, Agamemnon, Ajax, or Odysseus were not—in the original tale—fellow citizens. Another fragment of the play is preserved by Festus, who quotes the line "prolato aere astitit," which—according to Festus—meant "with a shield held out before him." However, according to Jocelyn, it is more likely that the passage refers to the large size of Ajax's shield in Greek mythology. There is a passage preserved in the works of the 2nd-century author Aulus Gellius, who documents some oath or supplication addressed to the gods, which Jocelyn suggests—due to the "philosophical" tone—may have been spoken by Phoenix, the tutor of Achilles. The broader passage containing this invocation of the divine includes alliteration and assonance, reading "sonitu saevo et spiritu" ("with fierce sound and uproar"). Jocelyn suggests that the repetition of the S and U sounds may serve to sound symbolically represent the storm weather on which the passage centers, though he notes that alliteration is such a common literary feature that it is difficult to confidently make such an assertion. This particular case of alliteration is, however, somewhat unusual, for alliteration involving S is less common than that of C and P, and assonance of long Ū is rare.
