= Carmina Convivalia =

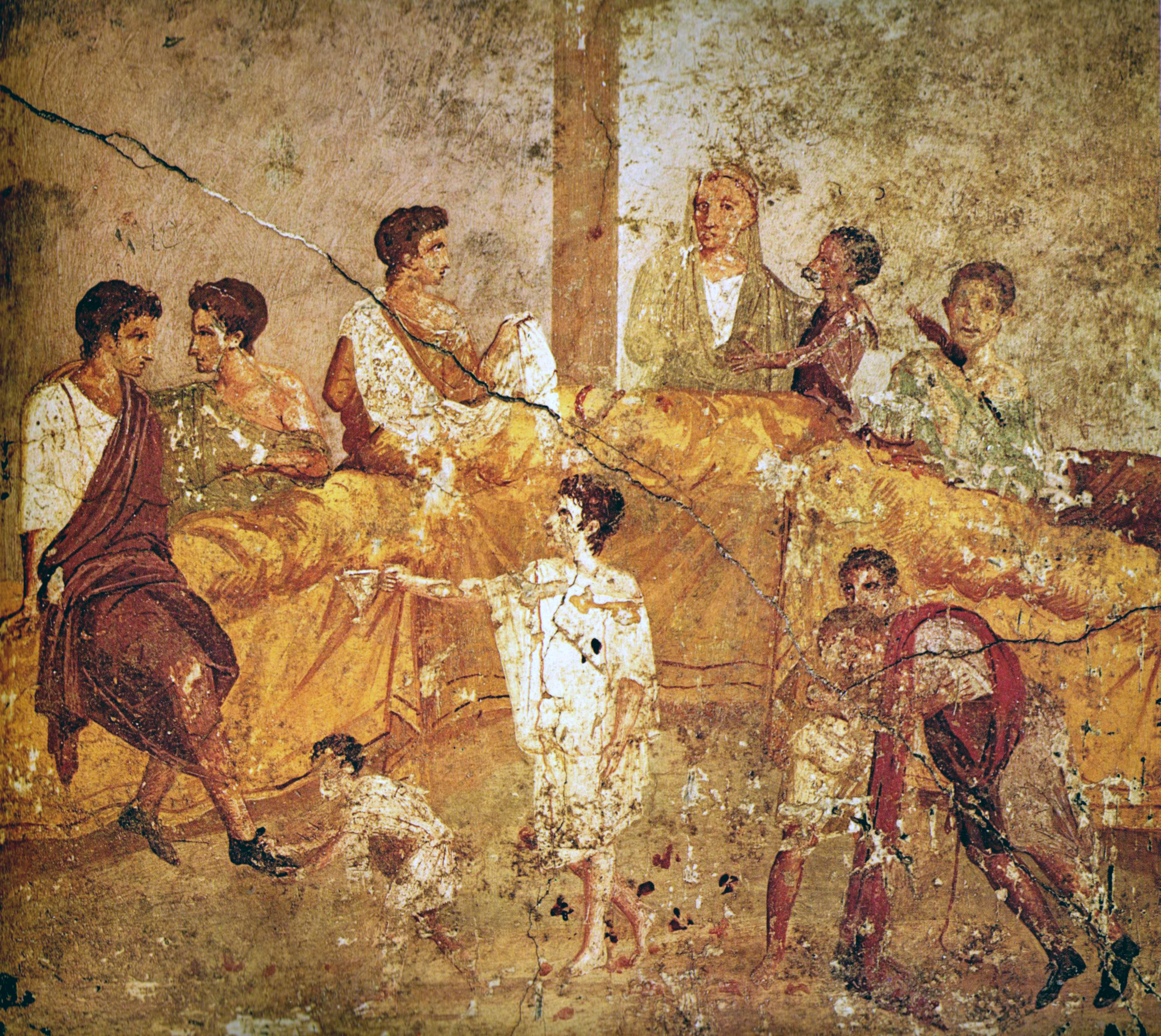
Painting from Pompeii, now in the National Archaeological Museum, showing a Roman banquet

The Carmina Convivalia were ancient Roman banquet songs from the pre-literary period. Guests sang or recited them during formal meals to praise the great deeds of noble ancestors. Very little of them has survived, although some scholars have linked the surviving fragments of the Carmen Priami and the Carmen Nelei to this tradition.

== History ==
The Carmina Convivalia were sung by guests or young noblemen (pueri), accompanied by the tibia, during banquets held at the homes of prominent Roman families. Their purpose was to glorify the deeds of the family's illustrious ancestors and recount the myths of Rome's founding and its most famous military exploits. According to scholars like Giambattista Vico, Barthold Georg Niebuhr and Arnaldo Momigliano the epics and legends of ancient Rome originated from these ancient ballads. Massimo Lenchantin de Gubernatis has proposed that Ennius, Naevius and Virgil drew on these traditional Latin folk poems, combining them with Greek epic motifs and techniques.

== Testimonies ==
Our only source of information about the Carmina Convivalia is the writings of classical Latin authors such as Cato the Elder, Cicero and Varro. Two poems, the Carmen Nelei and the Carmen Priami, about which we know very little, are sometimes cited as examples of the Carmina Convivalia. According to Cicero:

At the banquets of our ancestors, Cato tells us, there was a custom that those seated had to sing, each in turn and accompanied by the flute, about the noble deeds and virtues of great men. This is clear proof that music and poetry already existed at that time.

— Cicero, Tusculanae Disputationes, IV, 2, 3

In a surviving fragment of his lost treatise De Vita Populi Romani, Varro relates that:

During banquets, the children of noble families sang ancient songs in honour of our ancestors, either a cappella or accompanied by the flute.

— Varro, De Vita Populi Romani, 77, 2

From a passage of Dionysius of Halicarnassus's Roman Antiquities and an ode by Horace, it appears that songs celebrating the founding heroes were probably still recited in the classical period, in line with the cultural restoration policy implemented by Augustus.

Horace himself provides us with a poetic description of the Carmina Convivalia:

And we, on days of pleasant labour and days of celebration, among the gifts of joyful freedom, with our children and our wives, after having ritually prayed to the gods, according to the custom of our ancestors, to the sound of harmonious flutes, will sing of the heroes who lived valiantly, and Troy, Anchises, and the lineage of divine Venus.

— Horace, Odes, IV, 15, 25–32

== Bibliography ==
- Lenchantin De Gubernatis, Massimo (1931). "CONVIVALI, CARMI". Enciclopedia Italiana. Rome: Istituto dell'Enciclopedia Italiana.
- Zorzetti, Nevio (1990). "The Carmina Convivalia". In Oswyn Murray (ed.). Sympotica: A Symposium on the Symposion. Oxford: Oxford Academic. doi:10.1093/oso/9780198148616.003.0022.
