= Ambracia (play) =

Lost play by Ennius

- Original language: Old Latin
- Written by: Ennius
- First publication: Likely c. 189-187 BCE
- Genre: fabula praetexta

Ambracia is a now-lost play by Ennius that probably narrated events associated with the conquests of Marcus Fulvius Nobilior, who—in 189 BCE—waged war against the Aetolians and captured the city of Ambracia. Nobilius became the subject of controversy in Rome when he utilized spoils from his campaigns to fund the aforementioned special games, prompting criticism from figures such as Cato the Elder. In this context, according to Flower, the play Ambracia can be understood as most likely an attempt to defend Fulvius from political attacks.

== Date ==
The classicist Harriet Flower has suggested four possible dates for the performance of the play: In 187 BCE, at Fulvius's triumph; in 186 BCE, at the ludi votivi celebrated at Ambracia, which were themselves organized by Nobilior in fulfillment of a vow he made whilst on campaign; perhaps when the Temple of Hercules Musarum was dedicated, which Fulvius built utilizing loot garnered from his conquests; or perhaps at Fulvius's funeral, itself probably sometime after 178 BCE. The classicist Seth Jeppesen argues that—of these three possibilities—it is perhaps most likely that the play was performed at the ludi votivi, since—according to Seth—this particular occasion was more befitting the staging of a play then the triumph, which was rushed to completion before the consul Marcus Aemilius Lepidus could return to Rome in time to block the ceremony. Moreover, Jeppesen argues that it is not even fully clear that Fulvius was present at the dedication of the temple. If it is accepted that the play was performed in 186 BCE, then it is possible that it was shown alongside the Amphitryon, a comedy that revolves around the plot of a general returning home from war and facing opposition, which parallels the political troubles affecting Nobilius. Given the contextual similarities of the Plautian and Ennian works, it is possible that both plays were thematically linked in some way.

== Influence ==
Livy, a 1st-century BCE historian, in his account of the siege of Ambracia, includes—alongside bare historical facts—more artistic portrayals of the emotional reactions of the besieged, describing their initial fear followed by their resurgence of hope as they successfully counter the Roman army. These details from Livy perhaps derive from this Ennian play, for Roman historians in general may have frequently borrowed from fabulae praetextae when authoring their own works. However, the source from which Livy drew at least the purely historical details—a work by the 2nd-century BCE historian Polybius—is now lost, with a possibly abridged version preserved in the much later text De Obsidione Toleranda. Given that the original text by Polybius is lost, it cannot be definitively concluded that it did not also share the more creative comments on the siege.
