= Tutoria gens =

Ancient Roman family

The gens Tutoria was an obscure plebeian family at ancient Rome. No members of this gens are mentioned by Roman writers, but a number are known from inscriptions.

== Origin ==
The nomen Tutorius belongs to a class of gentilicia derived from cognomina indicating the occupation of the bearer. A tutor was a guardian or protector.

== Praenomina ==
The Tutorii used a variety of praenomina, particularly Publius, Gnaeus, and Numerius, of which the last was uncommon at Rome, although widespread in the countryside. Other names were used by individual Tutorii, including Decimus, Lucius, Marcus, and Titus.

== Members ==
This list includes abbreviated praenomina. For an explanation of this practice, see filiation.

- Publius Tutorius Antiochus, one of the priests of Neptune on the island of Ortygia in Achaia in 125 BC. He might have been the master of Gnaeus Tutorius Olympiodorus.
- Gnaeus Tutorius P. l. Olympiodorus, a freedman, and one of the priests of Jupiter on Ortygia. He might have been manumitted by Publius Tutorius Antiochus.
- Gnaeus Tutorius Cn. f., one of the priests of Mercury, Apollo, Neptune, and Hercules on Ortygia in 113 BC. He was probably the son of Gnaeus Tutorius Olympiodorus, and the former master of Numerius Tutorius.
- Numerius Tutorius Cn. l., a freedman, and one of the priests of Mercury, Apollo, Neptune, and Hercules on Ortygia in 113 BC. He had likely been manumitted by the priest Gnaeus Tutorius.
- Tutornia N. f., named along with her father, Numerius Tutorius Blattus, in an inscription from Canusium in Apulia, dating from the middle part of the first century BC.
- Numerius Tutorius Blattus, named along with his daughter, Tutoria, in an inscription from Canusium dating from the middle part of the first century BC.
- Titus Tutorius T. f. Paulus, one of the municipal quattuorviri quinquenniales at Cales in Campania, along with Lucius Minutius Pica, named in an inscription dating between 50 and 30 BC.
- Tutoria, a freedwoman named along with the freedwoman Tutoria Ammia and the freedman Lucius Tutorius Protogenes, in an inscription from Canusium, dating from the latter half of the first century BC.
- Tutoria Ɔ. l. Ammia, a freedwoman named along with the freedwoman Tutoria and the freedman Lucius Tutorius Protogenes, in an inscription from Canusium, dating from the latter half of the first century BC.
- Tutoria Ɔ. l. Aphrodisia, a freedwoman buried at Brundisium in Calabria, in a tomb dating from the latter half of the first century BC.
- Lucius Tutorius Ɔ. l. Protogenes, a freedman named along with the freedwomen Tutoria and Tutoria Ammia, in an inscription from Canusium, dating from the latter half of the first century BC.
- Tutoria Rufa, buried at Brundisium in a tomb dating from the latter half of the first century BC.
- Tutoria C. l. Martha, a freedwoman buried at Rome, along with the freedmen Publius Sestius Epitynchanus and Publius Sestius Pamphilus, in a tomb dating from the latter half of the first century BC, or the first half of the first century AD.
- Tutoria, named in a sepulchral inscription from Brundisium, dating between the late first century BC and the middle of the first century AD.
- Marcus Tutorius M. l. Men[...], a freedman named along with the freedman Marcus Tutorius Pha[...] in an inscription from Puteoli in Campania, dating from the first half of the first century.
- Marcus Tutorius M. l. Pha[...], a freedman named along with the freedman Marcus Tutorius Men[...] in an inscription from Puteoli, dating from the first half of the first century.
- Decimus Tutorius, one of the Seviri Augustales named in an inscription from Brundisium, dating from AD 32 or 33.
- Tutoria Clara, named in a first-century sepulchral inscription from Canusium.
- Tutoria Optata, buried in a first-century tomb at Brundisium.
- Tutoria P. l. Phronesis, a freedwoman buried in a first-century family sepulchre at Canusium. She was the wife of either Lucius Tullius Naso or Lucius Tullius Nasica, (Note: The inscription doesn't indicate how Naso and Nasica were related—perhaps a father and son, but without more information it isn't clear which would be which. Tutoria is named immediately following Naso, suggesting that she was his wife, rather than Nasica's.) both buried in the same sepulchre, along with the freedwoman Tullia Salvia.
- Tutoria Avita, buried at Celeia in Noricum, aged fifty-five, in a second-century family sepulchre built by her husband, Gaius Spectatius Secundinus, for himself and Avita, along with their son, Gaius Spectatius Cerva, aged twenty-eight, grandson, Rusticius Tutorius, aged twelve, son, (Note: Perhaps this should be son-in-law.) Rusticius Albinus, aged thirty, Spectatia Severina, aged twenty-five, Spectatius Avitus, aged eighty, and Aurelia Severina.
- Publius Tutorius P. f. Hermatianus, a youth buried at Lupiae in Calabria, aged twelve, along with his mother, Aelia Thetis, in a late second-century tomb built by his father, Publius Tutorius Hilarianus.
- Publius Tutorius Hilarianus, dedicated a late second-century tomb at Lupiae for his son, Publius Tutorius Hermatianus, and wife, Aelia Thetis, aged thirty-seven.
- Tutoria, the mistress of Fortunata, a slave buried at Brundisium, with a tomb dedicated by her husband, Fortunatus, and dating from the first half of the third century.

=== Undated Tutorii ===
- Tutoria, buried at Rome, along with Ulpia Athenais, in a tomb built by Titus Flavius Genethlius, a nummularius, or money-changer.
- Tutoria Daphnis, buried at Rudiae in Calabria, aged twenty-five.

== See also ==
- List of Roman gentes

== Bibliography ==
- Theodor Mommsen et alii, Corpus Inscriptionum Latinarum (The Body of Latin Inscriptions, abbreviated CIL), Berlin-Brandenburgische Akademie der Wissenschaften (1853–present).
- Notizie degli Scavi di Antichità (News of Excavations from Antiquity, abbreviated NSA), Accademia dei Lincei (1876–present).
- René Cagnat et alii, L'Année épigraphique (The Year in Epigraphy, abbreviated AE), Presses Universitaires de France (1888–present).
- George Davis Chase, "The Origin of Roman Praenomina", in Harvard Studies in Classical Philology, vol. VIII, pp. 103–184 (1897).
- D.P. Simpson, Cassell's Latin and English Dictionary, Macmillan Publishing Company, New York (1963).
