= Aristarchus of Tegea =

Ancient Greek writer

Aristarchus or Aristarch of Tegea (Ancient Greek: Ἀρίσταρχος ὁ Τεγεάτης, Aristarkhos ho Tegeates) was a Greek tragic poet and a contemporary of Sophocles and Euripides. He lived to be a centenarian, composed seventy plays, and won two tragic victories. Only the titles of three of his plays (Achilles, Asclepius, and Tantalus), along with a single line of the text, have survived, although Ennius freely borrowed from his play about Achilles. Among his merits seems to have been that of brevity; for, as the Suda relates, he was "the first one to make his plays of the present length."
