= Gaius Lucilius =

2nd-century-BC Roman satirist

- Born: 180, 168 or 148 BC
- Died: 103 BC; Neapolis
- Occupation: Satirist

Military service
- Rank: Cavalryman
- Battles/wars: Numantine War (134 BC)

Gaius Lucilius (180, 168 or 148 BC – 103 BC) was the earliest Roman satirist, of whose writings only fragments remain. A Roman citizen of the equestrian class, he was born at Suessa Aurunca in Campania, and was a member of the Scipionic Circle.

== Problem of his birthdate ==
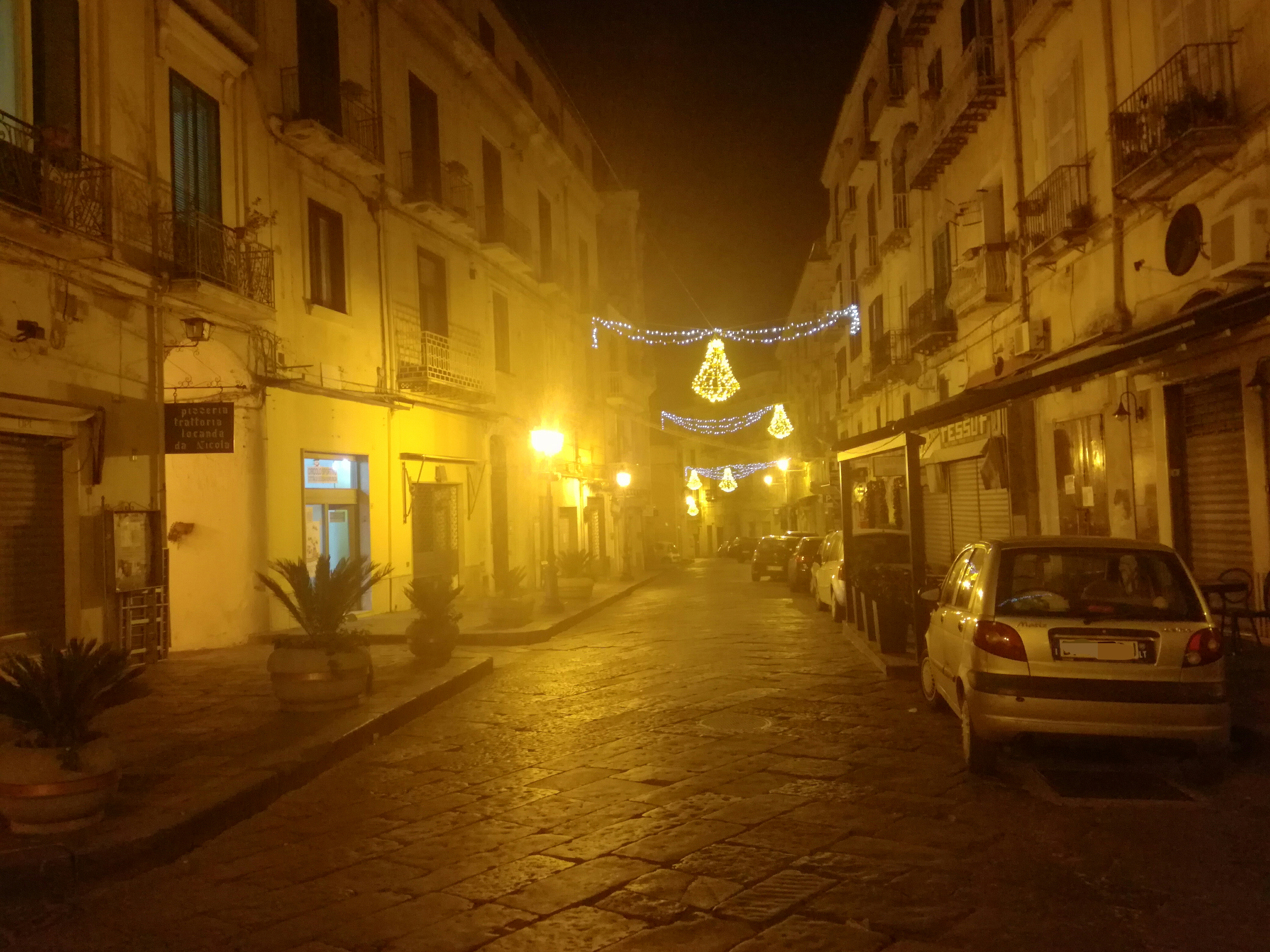
Corso Caio Lucilio in his hometown, Sessa Aurunca

The dates assigned by Jerome for Lucilius' birth and death are 148 BC and 103 BC, but it is impossible to reconcile the first of these dates with other facts recorded of him, and the date given by Jerome must be due to an error, the true date being about 180 BC. His sister was Lucilia, mother of Roman Politician Sextus Pompeius and paternal grandmother of Pompey the Great.

According to Velleius Paterculus, he served under Scipio Aemilianus at the siege of Numantia in 134 BC. Horace notes that he lived on the most intimate terms of friendship with Scipio and Laelius (Satire ii.1), and that he celebrated the exploits and virtues of the former in his satires.

Fragments of those books of his satires which seem to have been first given to the world (XXVI–XXIX) clearly indicate that they were written in the lifetime of Scipio. Some of these bring the poet before us as either corresponding with, or engaged in controversial conversation with, his great friend. 621 Marx, "Percrepa pugnam Popilli, facta Corneli cane" ("Scream about Popillius' battle, and sing the exploits of Cornelius") in which the defeat of Marcus Popillius Laenas, in 138 BC, is contrasted with the subsequent success of Scipio, bears the stamp of having been written while the news of the capture of Numantia was still fresh.

It is in the highest degree improbable that Lucilius served in the army at the age of fourteen; it is still more unlikely that he could have been admitted into the familiar intimacy of Scipio and Laelius at that age. It also seems an impossibility that between the ages of fifteen and nineteen—i.e. between 133 BC and 129 BC, the year of Scipio's death—he could have come before the world as the author of an entirely new kind of composition, and one which, to be at all successful, demands especially maturity of judgment and experience.

It may further be said that the well-known words of Horace (Satires, ii. 1, 33), in which he characterizes the vivid portraiture of his life, character and thoughts, which Lucilius bequeathed to the world, "quo fit ut omnis Votiva pateat veluti descripta tabella Vita senis," ("Whereby the whole life of the old (great) man may be laid out as upon a votive tablet") lose much of their force unless senis is to be taken in its ordinary sense—which it cannot be if Lucilius died at the age of forty-six.

== Life and satire ==
Lucilius spent the greater part of his life at Rome and died, according to Jerome, at Naples. He belonged to the equestrian order, a fact indicated by Horace's notice of himself as infra Lucili censum. Though not himself belonging to any of the great senatorial families, he was in a position to associate with them on equal terms. As an equestrian, he was "one of the few outstanding poets of the period not of lowly birth". This circumstance contributed to the boldness, originality and thoroughly national character of his literary work. Had he been a semi-Graecus, like Ennius and Pacuvius, or of humble origin, like Plautus, Terence or Accius, he would scarcely have ventured, at a time when the senatorial power was strongly in the ascendant, to revive the role which had proved disastrous to Naevius; nor would he have had the intimate knowledge of the political and social life of his day which fitted him to be its painter. Another circumstance determining the bent of his mind was the character of the time. The origin of Roman political and social satire is to be traced to the same disturbing and disorganizing forces which led to the revolutionary projects and legislation of the Gracchi.

The reputation which Lucilius enjoyed in the best ages of Roman literature is proved by the terms in which Cicero and Horace speak of him. Persius, Juvenal and Quintilian vouch for the admiration with which he was regarded in the first century of the empire. The popularity which he enjoyed in his own time is attested by the fact that at his death, although he had filled none of the offices of state, he received the honour of a public funeral. His chief claim to distinction is his literary originality. He may be called the inventor of poetical satire, as he was the first to impress upon the rude inartistic medley, known to the Romans by the name of satura, that character of aggressive and censorious criticism of persons, morals, manners, politics, literature, etc. which the word satire has ever since denoted.

In point of form, the satire of Lucilius owed nothing to the Greeks. It was a legitimate development of an indigenous dramatic entertainment, popular among the Romans before the first introduction of the forms of Greek art among them; also, it seems largely to have employed the form of the familiar epistle. But the style, substance and spirit of his writings were apparently as original as the form. He seems to have commenced his poetical career by ridiculing and parodying the conventional language of epic and tragic poetry, and to have used the language commonly employed in the social intercourse of educated men. Even his frequent use of Greek words, phrases and quotations, reprehended by Horace, was probably taken from the actual practice of men, who found their own speech as yet inadequate to give free expression to the new ideas and impressions which they derived from their first contact with Greek philosophy, rhetoric and poetry.

Further, he not only created a style of his own, but, instead of taking the substance of his writings from Greek poetry, or from a remote past, he treated of the familiar matters of daily life, of the politics, the wars, the administration of justice, the eating and drinking, the money-making and money-spending, the scandals and vices, which made up the public and private life of Rome in the last quarter of the 2nd century BC. This he did in a singularly independent spirit, with no ambition to serve, or cause to advance, but with a desire to expose the incompetence of the governing body, the sordid aims of the middle class, and the corruption and venality of the city mob. There was nothing of stoical austerity or of rhetorical indignation in the tone in which he treated the vices of his time.

His character and tastes were much more akin to those of Horace than those of either Persius or Juvenal. But he was what Horace was not, a hater; and he lived at a time when the utmost freedom of speech and the most unrestrained indulgence of public and private animosity were the characteristics of men who took a prominent part in affairs. Although Lucilius took no active part in the public life of his time, he regarded it in the spirit of a man of the world and of society, as well as a man of letters. His ideal of public virtue and private worth had been formed by intimate association with the best of the soldiers and statesmen of an older generation.

The literary remains of Lucilius extend to about eleven hundred, mostly unconnected lines, most of them preserved by late grammarians, as illustrative of peculiar verbal usages. He was, for his time, a voluminous as well as a very discursive writer. He left behind him thirty books of satires, and there is reason to believe that each book, like the books of Horace and Juvenal, was composed of different pieces. The order in which they were known to the grammarians was not that in which they were written. The earliest in order of composition were probably those numbered from xxvi. to xxix., which were written in the trochaic and iambic metres that had been employed by Ennius and Pacuvius in their Saturae.

In these he made those criticisms on the older tragic and epic poets of which Horace and other ancient writers speak. In them too he speaks of the Numantine War as recently finished, and of Scipio as still living. Book i., on the other hand, in which the philosopher Carneades, who died in 128, is spoken of as dead, must have been written after the death of Scipio.

Most of the satires of Lucilius were written in hexameters, but, so far as an opinion can be formed from a number of unconnected fragments, he seems to have written the trochaic tetrameter with a smoothness, clearness and simplicity which he never attained in handling the hexameter. The longer fragments produce the impression of great discursiveness and carelessness, but at the same time of considerable force. He appears, in the composition of his various pieces, to have treated everything that occurred to him in the most desultory fashion, sometimes adopting the form of dialogue, sometimes that of an epistle or an imaginary discourse, and often to have spoken in his own name, giving an account of his travels and adventures, or of amusing scenes that he had witnessed, or expressing the results of his private meditation and experiences.

Like Horace he largely illustrated his own observations by personal anecdotes and fables. The fragments clearly show how often Horace has imitated him, not only in expression, but in the form of his satires (see for instance i. 5 and ii. 2), in the topic which he treats of, and the class of social vices and the types of character which he satirizes.

== Editions of the fragments ==
- Dousa, F: Leiden (1597), 2nd edition Amsterdam (1661)
- Marx, F: C. Lucili Carminum Reliquiae (Teubner, Leipzig)
  - vol. I Prolegomena and Text (1904)
  - vol. II Commentary (1905)
- Loeb Classical Library (L329, 1938), Remains of Old Latin, vol.III: Lucilius, The Twelve Tables, edited with Latin text and English translation by E. H. Warmington. ISBN 0-674-99363-2

== Sources ==
=== Ancient sources ===
- Stangl, Thomas: Ciceronis Orationum Scholiastae: Asconius. Scholia Bobiensia. Scholia Pseudoasconii Sangallensia. Scholia Cluniacensia et recentiora Ambrosiana ac Vaticana. Scholia Lugdunensia sive Gronoviana et eorum excerpta Lugdunensia (Vienna, 1912; reprinted Georg Olms, Hildesheim, 1964)
- Asconius. Caesar Giarratano (ed.) Q. Asconii Pediani Commentarii (Rome, 1920; reprinted Adolf M. Hakkert, Amsterdam, 1967)

=== Modern works ===
- Cichorius, C: Untersuchungen zu Lucilius (Berlin, 1908).
- Christes, J: "Lucilius. Ein Bericht über die Forschung seit F. MARX (1904/5)", in H.Temporini (ed.) ANRW I.2 (1972), 1182–1239.
- Krenkel, W A: "Zur Biographie des Lucilius", in H. Temporini (ed.) ANRW I.2 (1972), 1240–1259.
- Gruen, Erich S: Culture and National Identity in Republican Rome (Cornell University Press, 1992), especially chapter 7: "Lucilius and the Contemporary Scene", pp. 272–317.
