= Rudiae =

Archaeological park in Apulia, Italy

Coordinates: 40.334°N 18.147°E

Rudiae (Rusce ['Ruʃe] in the local dialect; Ῥοδίαι in ancient Greek) was a former human settlement in late 9th or early 8th centuries BCE. It is presently an archaeological park beside the San Pietro in Lama that runs south-west from the city of Lecce. The place was identified as the former home of the poet Ennius by the Renaissance Humanist, Antonio de Ferraris.

== Etymology ==
The name Rudiae is thought to derive from a Proto-Indo-European stem *roudh-io-, meaning 'red', a possible reference to the red-coloured soil of Apulia.

== History ==
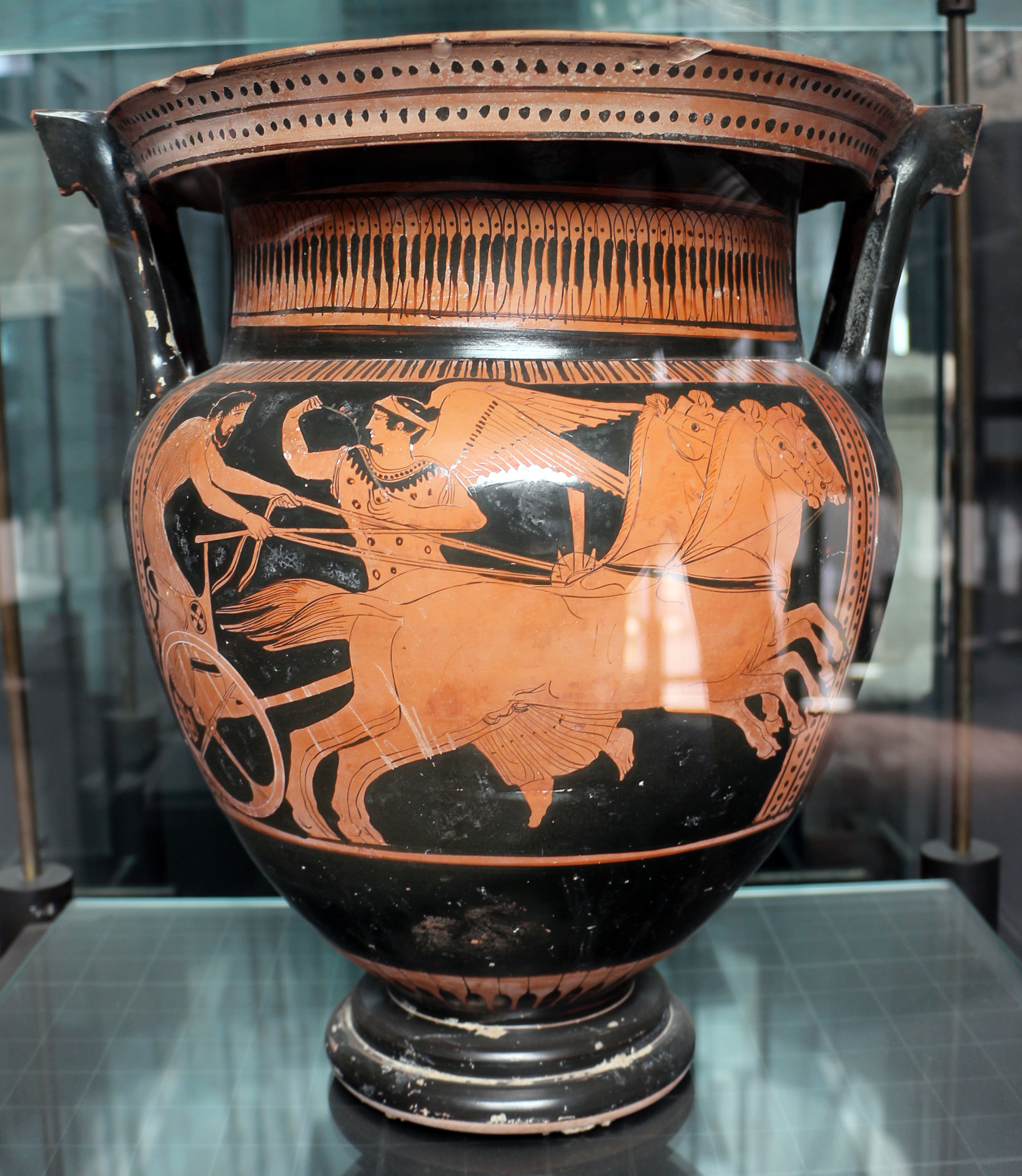
Victory crowns the winner of a chariot race in the amphitheatre, Greek pottery, 450-30 BCE

The ancient site of the city was first settled by the Messapians. In the late sixth century BCE it developed in importance and, even after it had been partially settled by Greeks during the period of Magna Graecia, it still retained some of its native traditions. Strabo called Rudiae a "Greek city". According to Aulus Gellius, the poet Ennius referred to the linguistic and cultural heritage given him by the city in asserting that he had "three hearts", Greek, Oscan and Latin (Quintus Ennius tria corda habere sese dicebat, quod loqui Graece et Osce et Latine sciret).

Rudiae is identified with the archaeological remains found in the immediate outskirts of Lecce. These comprise traces of an amphitheatre, a necropolis and two city walls built of tuff. In the past the walls were towered and defended by a ditch 4 km long. Judging by the extent of these, its entire area covered some 100 hectares, twice the size of nearby Lupiae (as Lecce was then called) in the Roman period. Later the city lost importance and by the first century CE, according to Silius Italicus, was reduced to a modest village even as its neighbour was growing in size and importance.

From the archaeological standpoint, however, Rudiae seems to have played the role of stylistic and distribution centre for funerary pottery over a considerable period. It is recognised as the most important site for both quantity and quality of such vases used in the Messapian region. Almost all local discoveries are housed in the Sigismondo Castromediano Museum in Lecce.
