= Gesine Manuwald =

German classical philologist

Gesine Manuwald is currently a Professor of Latin and Head of the Department of Greek and Latin at University College London. She focuses on Roman drama, epic and oratory (particularly Cicero) and the reception of Roman literature, especially in opera and Neo-Latin poetry. In January 2025, she assumed the position of General Editor of the Loeb Classical Library

== Career ==
Gesine Manuwald studied Classics and English at the University of Freiburg, with a year as an affiliate student at UCL. She was awarded the Heinz Maier-Leibnitz-Preis in 2001 for work on classical philology. From there she did her Ph.D. on Valerius Flaccus and a post-doctoral habilitation on the Roman dramatic genre fabula praetexta. During this time she also worked on a research project on Roman tragedy, which then led to a five-year research fellowship in which she was able to produce her commentary of Cicero's Philippics 3–9 (2007).

In 2007, Gesine Manuwald joined the UCL Department of Greek and Latin. She became a member of the Academia Europaea in 2014.

== Publications ==
- Die Cyzicus-Episode und ihre Funktion in den Argonautica des Valerius Flaccus, Göttingen 1999 (Hypomnemata 127)
- Fabulae praetextae. Spuren einer literarischen Gattung der Römer, München 2001 (Zetemata 108)
- Pacuvius – summus tragicus poeta. Zum dramatischen Profil seiner Tragödien, München / Leipzig 2003 (BzA 191)
- Römische Tragödien und Praetexten republikanischer Zeit: 1964–2002, Lustrum, Jahrgang 2001, Band 43, 2004, 11–237
- Cicero, Philippics 3–9. Edited with Introduction, Translation and Commentary. Vol. 1: Introduction, Text and Translation, References and Indexes; Vol. 2: Commentary, Berlin / New York 2007 (Texte und Kommentare 30)
- Cicero. Philippics. Edited and translated by D.R. Shackleton Bailey. Revised by John T. Ramsey and Gesine Manuwald, 2 vol., Cambridge (MA) / London 2009 (Cicero XVa / b; LCL 189 / 507).
- Roman Drama: A Reader, London 2010
- Roman Republican Theatre, Cambridge 2011
- Tragicorum Romanorum Fragmenta (TrRF). Volumen II. Ennius, Göttingen 2012
- Nero in Opera. Librettos as Transformations of Ancient Sources, Berlin / Boston 2013 (Transformationen der Antike 24)
- Cicero, London 2015 (Understanding Classics)
