= Pacuvius =

Roman tragic poet

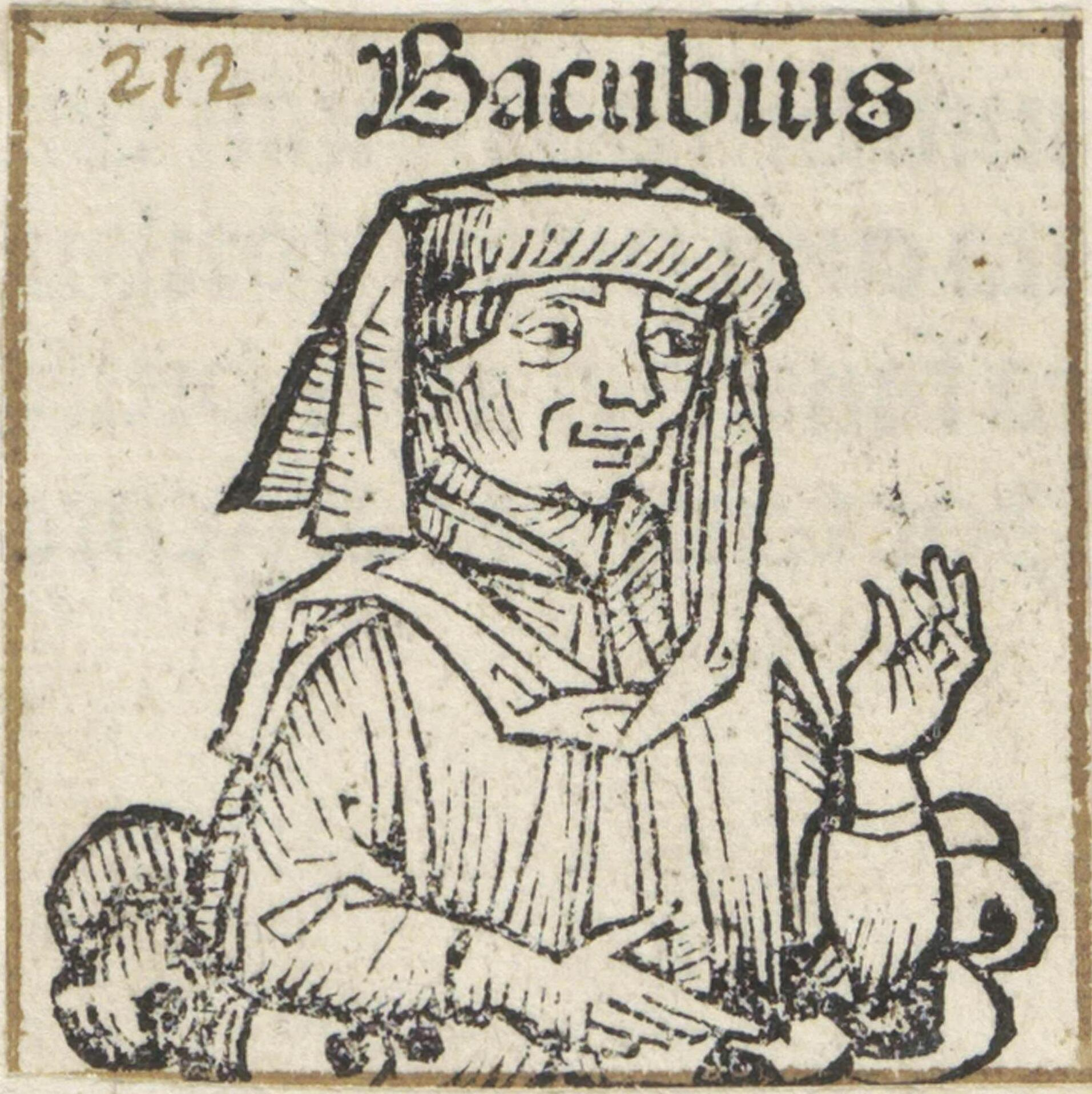
- An illustration of Pacuvius from the Nuremberg Chronicle
- Born: 220 BC; Brundisium
- Died: c. 130 BC; Tarentum
- Writing career
- Genre: Tragedy

Marcus Pacuvius (/pəˈkjuːviəs/; 220 – c. 130 BC) was an ancient Roman tragic poet. He is regarded as the greatest of their tragedians prior to Lucius Accius.

== Biography ==
He was the nephew and pupil of Ennius, by whom Roman tragedy was first raised to a position of influence and dignity. In the interval between the death of Ennius (169 BC) and the advent of Accius, the youngest and most productive of the tragic poets, Pacuvius alone maintained the continuity of the serious drama, and perpetuated the character first imparted to it by Ennius. Like Ennius he probably belonged to an Oscan stock, and was born at Brundisium, which had become a Roman colony in 244 BC.

Pacuvius obtained distinction also as a painter; and Pliny the Elder (Naturalis Historia xxxv) mentions a work of his in the Temple of Hercules in the Forum Boarium. He was less productive as a poet than either Ennius or Accius; we hear of only twelve of his plays, founded on Greek subjects and most of them connected to the Trojan cycle (Antiope, Armorum Judicium, Atalanta, Chryses, Dulorestes, Hermione, Iliona, Medus, Niptra, Pentheus, Periboea, and Teucer) and one praetexta (Paullus) written in connection with the victory of Lucius Aemilius Paullus Macedonicus at the Battle of Pydna (168 BC), as the Clastidium of Naevius and the Ambracia of Ennius were written in commemoration of great military successes.

He continued to write tragedies till the age of eighty, when he exhibited a play in the same year as Accius, who was then thirty years of age. He retired to Tarentum for the last years of his life, and a story is told by Aulus Gellius (xiii.2) of his being visited there by Accius on his way to Asia, who read his Atreus to him. The story is probably, like that of the visit of the young Terence to the veteran Caecilius Statius, due to the invention of later grammarians; but it is invented in accordance with the traditionary criticism (Horace, Epp. ii.1.5455) of the distinction between the two poets, the older being characterized rather by cultivated accomplishment (doctus), the younger by vigour and animation (altus).

== Epitaph ==
Pacuvius' epitaph, said to have been composed by himself, is quoted by Aulus Gellius (i.24), with a tribute of admiration to its "modesty, simplicity and fine serious spirit":

Adulescens, tametsi properas, te hoc saxum rogat
Ut sese aspicias, deinde quod scriptum 'st legas
Hic sunt poetae Pacuvi Marci sita
ossa. Hoc volebam nescius ne esses. Vale.

"Young man, though you are in a hurry, this stone asks you
to look at it, then to read what is written.
Here are placed the poet Pacuvius Marcus's
bones. I wished you to know this. Farewell."

== Literary legacy ==
Cicero, who frequently quotes from him with great admiration, appears (De Optimo Genere Oratorum, i) to rank him first among the Roman tragic poets, as Ennius among the epic, and Caecilius among the comic poets. The fragments of Pacuvius quoted by Cicero in illustration or enforcement of his own ethical teaching appeal, by the fortitude, dignity, and magnanimity of the sentiment expressed in them, to what was noblest in the Roman temperament. They are inspired also by a fervid and steadfast glow of spirit and reveal a gentleness and humanity of sentiment blended with the severe gravity of the original Roman character. So far too as the Romans were capable of taking interest in speculative questions, the tragic poets contributed to stimulate curiosity on such subjects, and they anticipated Lucretius in using the conclusions of speculative philosophy as well as of common sense to assail some of the prevailing forms of superstition.

Among the passages quoted from Pacuvius are several which indicate a taste both for physical and ethical speculation, and others which expose the pretensions of religious imposture. These poets aided also in developing that capacity which the Roman language subsequently displayed of being an organ of oratory, history and moral disquisition. The literary language of Rome was in process of formation during the 2nd century BC, and it was in the latter part of this century that the series of great Roman orators, with whose spirit Roman tragedy has a strong affinity, begins. But the new creative effort in language was accompanied by considerable crudeness of execution, and the novel word-formations and varieties of inflexion introduced by Pacuvius exposed him to the ridicule of the satirist Gaius Lucilius, and, long afterwards, to that of his imitator Persius.

But, notwithstanding the attempt to introduce an alien element into the Roman language, which proved incompatible with its natural genius, and his own failure to attain the idiomatic purity of Naevius, Plautus, or Terence, the fragments of his dramas are sufficient to prove the service which he rendered to the formation of the literary language of Rome as well as to the culture and character of his contemporaries.
