= Praetexta =

Genre of Latin tragedy

The praetexta or fabula praetexta was a genre of Latin tragedy introduced at Rome by Gnaeus Naevius in the third century BC. Subsequent writers of praetextae included Ennius, Pacuvius and Lucius Accius. The name refers to the toga praetexta, purple striped, that was the official dress of Roman magistrates and priests. According to the 4th-century grammarian Aelius Donatus, this genre was a form of tragedy that dealt with Roman subjects, writing "tragedy, if it has a Latin plot, is called praetexta." Elsewhere, Donatus states that "praetext(at)ae [so called] from the dignity of tragic characters from Latin history." Likewise, according to Diomedes Grammaticus—also a 4th-century author—praetextae are plays "in which the dealings of generals or public issues are performed, and Roman kings or leaders are brought on stage, similar to tragedies in the dignity of their characters and in loftiness."

All Roman Republican tragedies are now lost. From the Imperial era only one play has survived, the Octavia.

== See also ==
- Fabula atellana
- Fabula crepidata
- Fabula palliata
- Fabula saltata
- Fabula togata
- Theatre of ancient Rome

=== References ===
==== Bibliography ====
- Ginsberg, Lauren Donovan (2015-08-11). "Tragic Rome? Roman Historical Drama and the Genre of Tragedy". In Harrison, George W.M. (ed.). Brill's Companion to Roman Tragedy. Brill's Companions to Classical Studies. BRILL. doi:10.1163/9789004284784. ISBN 978-90-04-28478-4.
- Bernhard Zimmermann and Thomas Baier "Tragedy" in: Brill's New Pauly, Antiquity volumes edited by: Hubert Cancik and Helmuth Schneider. Consulted online on 21 July 2017
