= Gnaeus Naevius =

Roman epic poet and dramatist

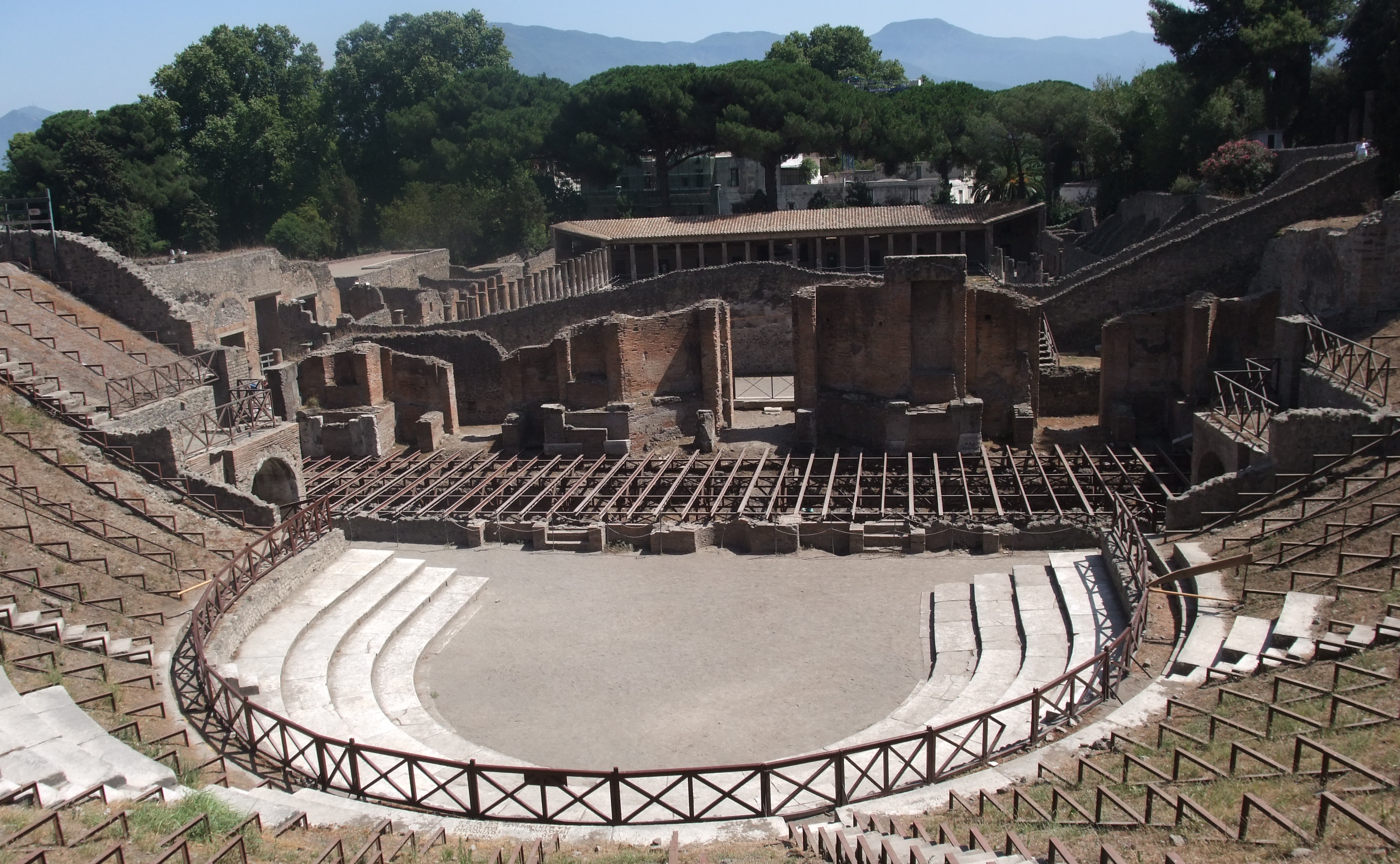
Theater in Pompeii

Gnaeus Naevius (/ˈniːviəs/; c. 270 – c. 201 BC) was a Roman epic poet and dramatist of the Old Latin period. He had a notable literary career at Rome until his satiric comments delivered in comedy angered the Metellus family, one of whom was consul. After a sojourn in prison he recanted and was set free by the tribunes (who had the tribunician power, in essence the power of habeas corpus). After a second offense he was exiled to Tunisia, where he wrote his own epitaph and committed suicide. His comedies were in the genre of Palliata Comoedia, an adaptation of Greek New Comedy. A soldier in the Punic Wars, he was highly patriotic, inventing a new genre called Praetextae Fabulae, an extension of tragedy to Roman national figures or incidents, named after the Toga praetexta worn by high officials. Of his writings there survive only fragments of several poems preserved in the citations of late ancient grammarians (Charisius, Aelius Donatus, Sextus Pompeius Festus, Aulus Gellius, Isidore, Macrobius, Nonius Marcellus, Priscian, Marcus Terentius Varro).

== Biography ==
Much of the information concerning the life of Naevius is coloured by uncertainty. Aulus Gellius describes the epitaph of Naevius as demonstrating "Campanian arrogance," based on which statement it has been suggested that Naevius was a native of Campania. The phrase "Campanian arrogance" seems, however, to have been a proverbial or idiomatic phrase indicating boastfulness. Further, the fact that there was a plebeian gens Naevia in Rome, makes it quite possible, even likely, that Naevius was a Roman citizen by birth. He served either in the Roman army or among the socii in the First Punic War, and thus must have reached manhood before 241.

His career as a dramatic author began with the exhibition of a drama in or about the year 235, and continued for thirty years. Towards the close he incurred the hostility of some of the nobility, especially, it is said, of the Metelli, by the attacks which he made upon them on the stage, and at their insistence he was imprisoned. After writing two plays during his imprisonment, in which he is said to have apologized for his former rudeness, he was liberated through the interference of the tribunes of the commons; but he had shortly afterwards to retire from Rome (in or about 204) to Utica. It may have been during his exile, when withdrawn from his active career as a dramatist, that he composed or completed his poem on the First Punic War. Probably his latest composition was his own epitaph, written in saturnian verse:

Immortales mortales si foret fas flere,
flerent diuae Camenae Naeuium poetam.
itaque, postquam est Orchi traditus thesauro,
obliti sunt Romani loquier lingua Latina.

Translation:

If immortals were allowed to weep for mortals,
the divine Muses would weep for the poet Naevius.
And so after he was delivered to the strongbox of Orc[h]us,
Romans forgot how to speak the Latin language.

If these lines were dictated by a jealousy of the growing ascendancy of Ennius, the life of Naevius must have been prolonged considerably beyond 204, the year in which Ennius began his career as an author in Rome. Unlike Livius Andronicus, Naevius was a native Italian, not a Greek; he was also an original writer, not a mere adapter or translator. If it is due to Livius that the forms of Latin literature were, from the first, molded on those of Greek literature, it is due to Naevius that much of its spirit and substance was of native growth.

== Works ==
Like Livius, Naevius professed to adapt Greek tragedies and comedies to the Roman stage. Among the titles of his tragedies are Aegisthus, Lycurgus, Andromache or Hector Proficiscens, Equus Troianus, the last named being performed at the opening of Pompey's theatre (55 BC). The national cast of his genius and temper was shown by his deviating from his Greek originals, and producing at least two specimens of the fabula praetexta (national drama), one founded on the childhood of Romulus and Remus (Lupus or Alimonium Romuli et Remi), the other called Clastidium, which celebrated the victory of Marcus Claudius Marcellus over the Celts (222 BC).

But it was as a writer of comedy that he was most famous, most productive and most original. While he is never ranked as a writer of tragedy with Ennius, Pacuvius, or Accius, he is placed in the canon of the grammarian Volcatius Sedigitus third (immediately after Caecilius and Plautus) in the rank of Roman comic authors. He is there characterized as ardent and impetuous in character and style. He is also appealed to, with Plautus and Ennius, as a master of his art in one of the prologues of Terence. Naevius' comedy, like that of Plautus, seems to have been rather a free adaptation of his originals than a rude copy of them, as those of Livius probably were, or an artistic copy like those of Terence. The titles of most of them, like those of Plautus, and unlike those of Caecilius and Terence, are Latin, not Greek. He drew from the writers of the old political comedy of Athens, as well as from the new comedy of manners, and he attempted to make the stage at Rome, as it had been at Athens, an arena of political and personal warfare. A strong spirit of partisanship is recognized in more than one of the fragments; and this spirit is thoroughly popular and adverse to the senatorial ascendancy which became more and more confirmed with the progress of the Second Punic War. Besides his attack on the Metelli and other members of the aristocracy, the great Scipio is the object of a censorious criticism on account of a youthful escapade attributed to him. Among the few lines still remaining from his lost comedies, we seem to recognize the idiomatic force and rapidity of movement characteristic of the style of Plautus. There is also found that love of alliteration which is a marked feature in all the older Latin poets down even to Lucretius.

He was not only the oldest native dramatist, but the first author of an epic poem (Bellum Punicum) which, by combining the representation of actual contemporary history with a mythical background, may be said to have created the Roman type of epic poetry. The poem was one continuous work, but was divided into seven books by a grammarian of a later age. The earlier part of it treated of the mythical adventures of Aeneas in Sicily, Carthage, and Italy, and borrowed from the interview of Zeus and Thetis in the first book of the Iliad the idea of the interview of Jupiter and Venus; which Virgil has made one of the cardinal passages in the Aeneid. The later part treated of the events of the First Punic War in the style of a metrical chronicle. An important influence in Roman literature and belief, which had its origin in Sicily, first appeared in this poem: the recognition of the mythical connection of Aeneas and his Trojans with the foundation of Rome. The few remaining fragments produce the impression of vivid and rapid narrative, to which the flow of the native Saturnian verse, in contradistinction to the weighty and complex structure of the hexameter, was naturally adapted.

Based on the evidence, it appears that—whether or not he actually enjoyed the full rights of Roman citizenship—he was a vigorous representative of the bold combative spirit of the ancient Roman commons. He was one of those who made the Latin language into a great organ of literature. The phrases still quoted from him have nothing of an antiquated sound, though they have a genuinely idiomatic ring. As a dramatist he worked more in the spirit of Plautus than of Ennius, Pacuvius, Accius, or Terence; but the great Umbrian humorist is separated from his older contemporary, not only by his breadth of comic power, but by his general attitude of moral and political indifference. The power of Naevius was the more genuine Italian gift, the power of satiric criticism which was employed in making men ridiculous; not, like that of Plautus, in extracting amusement from the humours, follies and eccentricities of life. Although our means of forming a fair estimate of Naevius are scanty, all that we do know of him leads to the conclusion that he was far from being the least among the makers of Roman literature, and that with the loss of his writings there was lost a vein of national feeling and genius which rarely reappears.

== Surviving titles and fragments ==
- Acontizomenos ("Speared," a comedy), based on an otherwise unknown Greek original, perhaps the Akontizómenos of Dionysius of Sinope, though only a single fragment of this Greek play has survived. Based on what survives of this work of Naevius, it can be concluded that the plot revolved around some individual accidentally killing with a spear the wrong member of a pair of twins with whom he or his father had a dispute.
- Aegisthus ("Aegisthus," a tragedy)
- Aesiona (a tragedy)
- Agitatoria ("The play of the Charioteer," a comedy), based on an entirely unknown Greek original. The few surviving fragments indicate that the play centered around a father coming into conflict with his son on account of the latter's love for chariot-racing.
- Agrypnuntes ("Sleepless People," a comedy), based on an otherwise unknown Greek original. The surviving fragments are unrelated and thus convey nothing of the plot. One of them specifically refers to the scaena ("stage") and therefore appears to represent some sort of fourth wall breaking scene. The other snippet of the play consists of a character mocking another for their overly verbose speeches.
- Appella (a comedy)
- Astiologa (a comedy)
- Clastidium ("The Fortress," a fabula praetexta), this play described the victory at Clastidium in 222 BCE. The only two preserved fragments describe the celebrations after the fact. It is possible that this play was more specifically performed in 208 BCE, during the funeral games hosted for Marcus Claudius Marcellus, the Roman general during the battle. Alternatively, the play might have been performed in 205 BCE, when Marcus Claudius Marcellus—the son of the aforementioned general—dedicated a temple.
- Colax ("The Flatterer," a comedy)
- Corollaria ("The Garlands," a comedy)
- Danae ("Danae," a tragedy), detailed events relating to the myth of Danae. The surviving fragments concern her rape by Jupiter, the discovery of this deed, her ensuing pregnancy, and Acrisius exiling her.
- Dementes ("Crazy People," a comedy), known only from a single fragment, from which little information about the plot can be derived. The Greek original of this work is also unknown, though there is a known play entitled Mainómenos ("The Madman") by Diphilus and a play of a similar name authored by Anaxandrides. However, the plural nature of the title of Naevius's work suggests that it differed in plot from the aforementioned Greek plays.
- Dolus ("The Trick," a comedy)
- Equus Troianus ("The Trojan Horse," a tragedy)
- Figulus ("The Potter," a comedy)
- Glaucoma ("The Cataract," a comedy)
- Hariolus ("The Fortune-Teller," comedy)
- Hector Proficiscens ("Hector Setting Forth," tragedy), appears to have centered around Hector saying goodbye to his family before setting off for battle.
- Leo ("The Lion," a comedy)
- Lycurgus ("Lycurgus," a tragedy)
- Nautae ("Sailors", a comedy)
- Paelex ("The Concubine," or "Mistress", comedy)
- Personata ("Lady Wearing a Mask," comedy)
- Projectus (a comedy)
- Quadrigemini ("The Quadruplets," a comedy)
- Romulus, or Alimonium Romuli et Remi ("The Nourishing of Romulus and Remus", a fabula praetexta)
- Stalagmus (a comedy)
- Stigmatias ("The Tattooed Man," a comedy)
- Tarentilla (a comedy)
- Triphallus ("The Man With Three Penises," a comedy)

=== Editions ===
- M. Barchiesi. Nevio epico; storia, interpretazione, edizione critica dei frammenti del primo epos latino, Padova, 1962
- Fragments (dramas) in Lucian Müller, Livi Andronici et Gn. Naevi Fabularum Reliquiae (1885), and (Bellum Punicum) in his edition of Ennius (1884).
- W. Morel, Fragmenta Poetarum Latinorum Epicorum et Lyricorum praeter Ennium et Lucilium (Leipzig, 1927)
- E. H. Warmington, Remains of Old Latin, vol. II, Livius Andronicus, Naevius, Pacuvius, Accius, 1936.
- Naeuius Poeta. Introduzione bibliografica. Testo dei frammenti e commento, éd. E. V. Marmorale, Florence, 2e éd. 1950.
- Alfred Klotz, Scaenicorum Romanorum fragmenta, vol. I, Tragicorum fragmenta, München, 1953.

== See also ==
- Old Latin
- Saturnian (poetry)
- Theatre of ancient Rome

== Notes ==
=== Bibliography ===
- Maltby, Robert; Slater, Niall W. (December 27, 2022), Fragmentary Republican Latin, Volume VI: Livius Andronicus. Naevius. Caecilius, Harvard University Press, ISBN 9780674997486
