= Ennius =

Roman writer and poet (c. 239 – c. 169 BC)

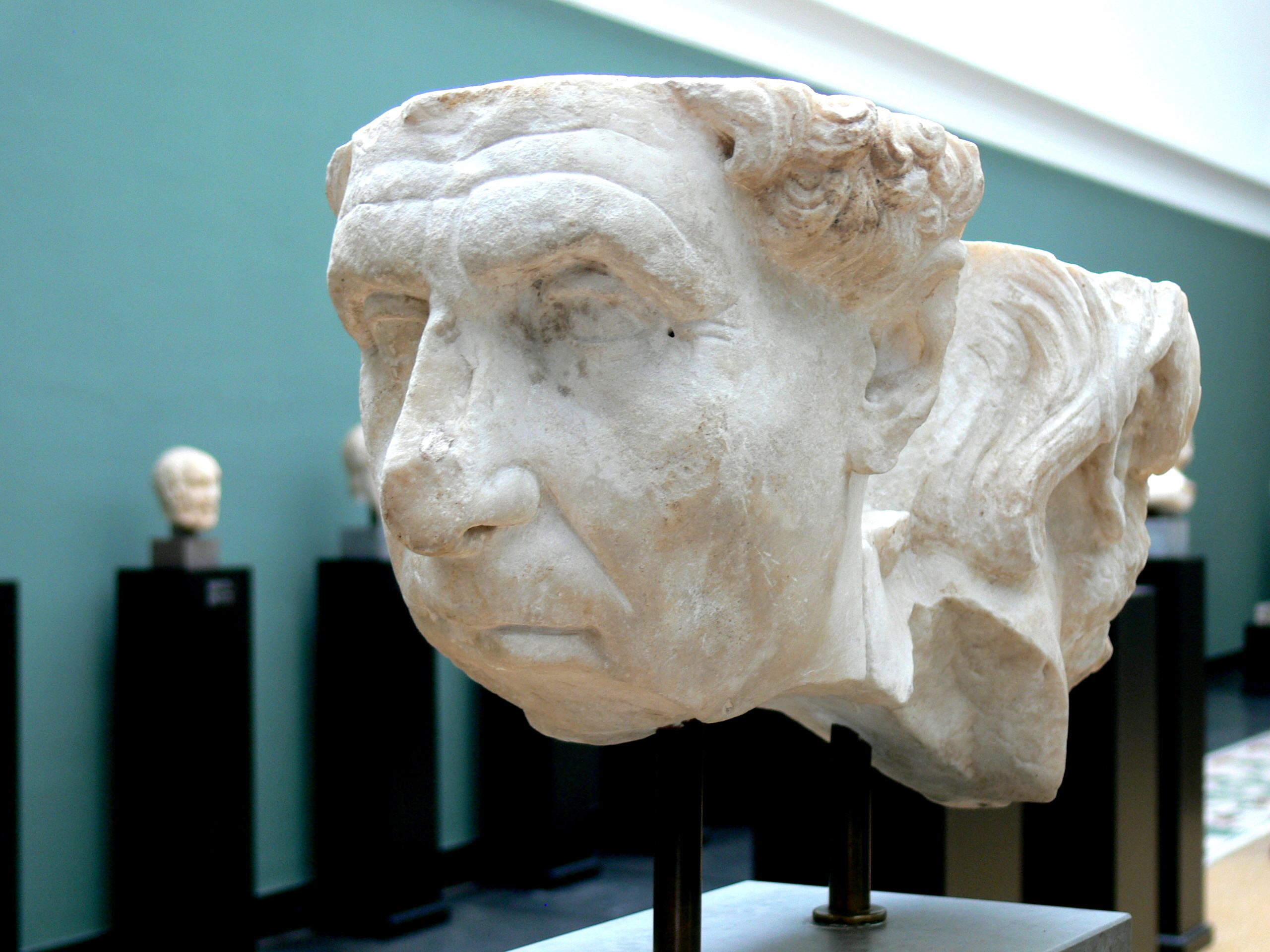
- Double herm with the portrait of the Roman poets Virgil or Ennius
- Born: Quintus Ennius c. 239 BC; Rudiae, Roman Republic
- Died: c. 169 BC
- Occupation: Poet
- Writing career
- Genre: Epic poetry

Quintus Ennius (Latin: [ˈkᶣiːnt̪ʊs̺ ˈɛnːiʊs̺]; c. 239 – c. 169 BC) was a writer and poet who lived during the Roman Republic. He is often considered the father of Roman poetry. He was born in the small town of Rudiae, located near modern Lecce (ancient Calabria, today Salento), a town founded by the Messapians, and could speak Greek as well as Latin and Oscan (his native language). Although only fragments of his works survive, his influence in Latin literature was significant, particularly in his use of Greek literary models.

== Biography ==
Very little is reliably known about the life of Ennius. His contemporaries hardly mentioned him and much that is related about him could have been embroidered from references to himself in his now fragmentary writings. Some lines of the Annales, as well as ancient testimonies, for example, suggest that Ennius opened his epic with a recollection of a dream in which the ancient epic-writer Homer informed him that his spirit had been reborn into Ennius. It is true that the doctrine of the transmigration of souls once flourished in the areas of Italy settled by Greeks, but the statement might have been no more than a literary flourish. Ennius seems to have been given to making large claims, as in the report by Maurus Servius Honoratus that he claimed descent from Messapus, the legendary king of his native district. The partially Hellenised city of Rudiae (in modern Apulia), his place of birth, was certainly in the area settled by the Messapians. And this, he used to say, according to Aulus Gellius, had endowed him with a triple linguistic and cultural heritage, fancifully described as "three hearts … Greek, Oscan and Latin".

The public career of Ennius first really emerges in middle life, when he was serving in the army with the rank of centurion during the Second Punic War. While in Sardinia in the year 204 BC, he is said to have attracted the attention of Cato the Elder and was taken by him to Rome. There he taught Greek and adapted Greek plays for a livelihood, and by his poetical compositions gained the friendship of some of the greatest men in Rome whose achievements he praised. Amongst these were Scipio Africanus and Fulvius Nobilior, whom he accompanied on his Aetolian campaign (189). Afterwards he made the capture of Ambracia, at which he was present, the subject of a play and of an episode in the Annales. It was through the influence of Nobilior's son Quintus that Ennius subsequently obtained Roman citizenship. But he himself lived plainly and simply in the literary quarter on the Aventine Hill with the poet Caecilius Statius, a fellow adapter of Greek plays.

At about the age of 70 Ennius died, immediately after producing his tragedy Thyestes. In the last book of his epic poem, in which he seems to have given various details of his personal history, he mentioned that he was in his 67th year at the date of its composition. He compared himself, in contemplation of the close of the great work of his life, to a gallant horse which, after having often won the prize at the Olympic Games, obtained his rest when weary with age. A similar feeling of pride at the completion of a great career is expressed in the memorial lines which he composed to be placed under his bust after death: "Let no one weep for me, or celebrate my funeral with mourning; for I still live, as I pass to and fro through the mouths of men."

== Literature ==
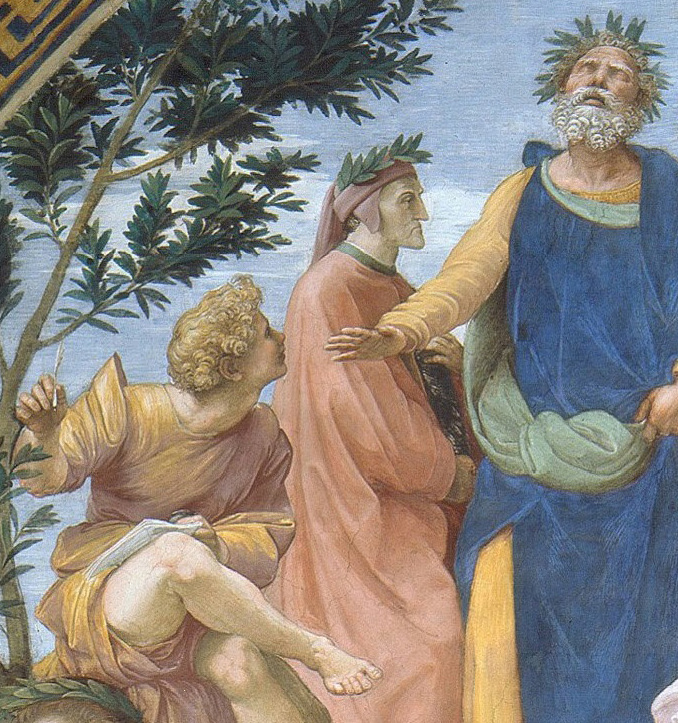
Detail from Raphael's Parnassus: Ennius, Dante and Homer

Ennius continued the nascent literary tradition by writing plays in Greek and Roman style (praetextae and palliatae), as well as his most famous work, a historical epic in hexameters called the Annales. Other minor works include the Epicharmus, Epigrammata, the Euhemerus, the Hedyphagetica, Praecepta/Protrepticus, Saturae (or Satires), Scipio, and Sota.

=== The Annales ===
The Annales was an epic poem in fifteen books, later expanded to eighteen, covering Roman history from the fall of Troy in 1184 BC down to the censorship of Cato the Elder in 184 BC. It was the first Latin poem to adopt the dactylic hexameter metre used in Greek epic and didactic poetry, leading it to become the standard metre for these genres in Latin poetry. The Annals became a school text for Roman schoolchildren, eventually supplanted by Virgil's Aeneid. About 600 lines survive.

=== Tragedies ===
- Achilles or Achilles Aristarchi, a tragedy preserved in a select few fragments. It appears that the text described the attempts to convince Achilles to rejoin the Greek army after he had abandoned the fighting.
- Aiax ("Ajax"), recounted myths involving Ajax the Great. One surviving fragment mentions blood flowing from his body, and therefore probably describes his death. This play might have based on Sophocles's tragedy, also entitled Ajax. Cicero—in several of his writings—refers to some play about Ajax by an unknown author, which he differentiates from the "Homeric Ajax" ("Homericus Aiax"). It is possible that Cicero was either referring to the play Aiax by Livius Andronicus or the play by Ennius, but since Cicero otherwise expresses disdain for the plays of Livius, and nowhere else quotes him, it is perhaps more likely that Cicero was alluding to the Ennian work.
- Alcmeo, tells the story of Alcmeaeon as he attempts to escape from the Furies. All surviving fragments of the text detail with Alcmaeon anguishing or ruminating over his situation.
- Alexander, detailed the life of Alexander, son of king Priam. This play was probably modeled after the Alexandros of Euripides, which covered the same character.
- Andromacha, detailed the story of Andromache, the wife of Hector, following the Trojan War.
- Andromeda, told the myth of Andromeda. It is often assumed that this play was based on the play Andromeda by Euripides, though elsewhere Cicero—in his De Finibus—attempts to translate the original Greek play himself, which has been interpreted by some as evidence that the Ennian play was not an adaptation of the Euripidean work. Several of the surviving fragments appears to depict Perseus fighting the sea monster Cetus, another fragment appears to reference the marriage between Perseus and Andromeda, and a third fragment seems to consist of Andromeda lamenting her situation. In one surviving line, some unnamed female character bewails that "Because of you, I, being innocent, have been exposed to the daughters of Nereus." This fragment could imply a dialogue scene between Andromeda and her mother, Cassiopeia, though the classist T. B. L. Webster suggests that it could maybe have come from the prologue and could have perhaps been preceded by a phrase such as "crudelis mater" ("cruel mother").
- Athamas, presumably recounted some story from the life of Athamus. The classicist D. C. Braund suggests that Ennius may have been spurred to write this tragedy by a meeting with king Amynander of Athamania, who—alongside Ennius—was at Ambracia during its siege, and whose people—the Athamanians—claimed descent from Athamas. The sole surviving portion of the play appears to depict some sort of Bacchic celebration, and—given that the text is written in the third person—it presumably comes from some messenger speech wherein one character describes this event to another. More specifically, Otto Ribbeck, a German classical scholar, proposed that this fragment may come from a speech describing the incident wherein Ino is recognized at a Bacchic festival atop Mount Parnassus. If this theory is accepted, then the play might have been based on Euripides's Ino, and it perhaps had an identical plot to the lost work Ino authored by Livius Andronicus. However, the philologist Gesine Manuwald notes that this theory is speculative and uncertain. The one preserved fragment is written in Greek trimeter, which has led some to doubt that it was truly created by Ennius, though the classicists Sander M. Goldberg and Gesine Manuwald consider the atypical meter an insufficient basis for questioning the authorship, as "such a metrical structure is not impossible in early Latin poetry."such a metrical structure is not impossible in early Latin poetry."
- Cresphontes, a play about Cresphontes the Elder or Younger. Given that some of the fragments refer to the division of land, it is more likely that the play described the life of Cresphontes the Elder, who—in Greek mythology—conquered the Peloponnese and then distributed the land amongst his brothers.
- Erectheus, a play likely about the mythical Athenian king Erechtheus. The play was probably based on another work with an identical title by Euripides.
- Hectoris lytra ("Hector's ransom"), a play about the visit of king Priam to the tent of Achilles with the goal of recovering the body of his dead son Hector.
- Hecuba, a play about Queen Hecuba.
- Iphigenia, a play about Iphigenia. This work was probably modeled after the play Iphigenia in Aulis by Euripides, which described her sacrifice so as to enable the Greek fleet to sail to Troy.
- Medea or Medea Exul, a play about the character Medea. The surviving fragments appear to describe the part of her story where she is taking revenge on Jason, who has left her for another wife. Ennius probably modeled this work after the play Medea by Euripides.
- Melanippa, a play about Melanippe, the daughter of Aeolus. Ennius likely based his work on the play Melanippe The Philosopher by Euripides.
- Nemea, the details of this play's plot are unclear. It was perhaps similar to Euripides's play Hypsipyle, which itself described a Lemnian woman who, while a slave in Nemea, was put in charge of the king's son, but—through negligence—allowed for the boy to be killed by snakes. Alternatively, it may have depicted Nemea, the mother of Archemorus.
- Phoenix, a play about the mythical character Phoenix who desired to murder his father, Amyntor. The surviving fragments from Ennius appear to have heavily emphasized the conflict between Phoenix and his father.
- Telamo, a play about Telamon, a mythological king of Salamis. The surviving fragments deal largely with the conflict between Telamon and his son, Teucer.
- Telephus, describes myths involving Telephus. The surviving fragments describe the portion of his story wherein he is disguised as a beggar.
- Thyestes, a play about the character of Thyestes. This was Ennius's last tragedy, and it was likely modeled after a work of Euripides with an identical title.

=== Comedies ===
- Caupuncula, the name of this play has been corrupted in the manuscript tradition; it is varyingly recorded as Caupuncula, Copuncula, or Cupuncula, though it is generally restored by modern scholars as Caupuncula. It is probably derived from copa ("a woman who provides entertainment in taverns; dancing girl") or caupona ("land lady; tavern"). Given that the title did not refer to a character from Greek myth, it is likely that this play was a comedy, though no further details of its plot can be determined.
- Pancratiastes ("a combatant in the pancratium"), the title of this play was perhaps metaphorical; it may have more figuratively meant something akin to "the all-round champion." The title may further reference a stock type of slave in Roman comedy, another example of which is found in the character Palaestrio in Plautus's Miles Gloriosus. According to the classicist Amy Richlin, one of the fragments appears to consist of a "straight man" vs "funny man" exchange, with the former character archetype asking the latter, "Where are you taking me?" in response to which the other character says, "Where you’ll hear the noise of the millstones most clearly." This scene seems to depict someone punishing a slave by assigning them to work in a mill, a generic punishment for a slave in Roman culture.

=== Fabulae Praetextae ===
- Ambracia, probably a play narrating events associated with the conquests of Marcus Fulvius Nobilior, who—in 189 BCE—waged war against the Aetolians and captured the city of Ambracia.
- Sabinae, probably a play describing the story of the rape of the Sabine women. According to Goldberg and Manuwald, the sole surviving fragment might represent the moment when the women intervened in the fight between the Romans and Sabines.

=== Minor works ===
The Epicharmus was inspired by the philosophical hypotheses developed by the Sicilian poet and philosopher Epicharmus of Kos, after which Ennius's work took its name. In the Epicharmus, the poet describes a dream he had in which he died and was transported to some place of heavenly enlightenment. Here, he met Epicharmus, who explained the nature of the gods and taught Ennius the physics of the universe.

The Euhemerus presented a theological doctrine based on the ideas of Euhemerus of Messene, who argued that the gods of Olympus were not supernatural powers that interfere in the lives of humans, but rather heroes of old who after death were eventually regarded as deities due to their valor, bravery, or cultural impact (this belief is now known as euhemerism). Both Cicero and Lactantius write that the Euhemerus was a "translat[ion] and a recount[ing]" of Euhemerus's original work the Sacred History, but it is unclear if this means Ennius simply translated the original from Greek into Latin, or added in his own elements. Most of what is preserved of this work comes to us from Lactantius, and these snippets suggest that the Euhemerus was a prose text.

The Hedyphagetica took much of its substance from the gastronomical epic of Archestratus of Gela. The extant portions of Ennius's poem discuss where a reader might find the best type of fish. Most of the fragments, replete with unique terms for fish and numerous place names, are corrupt or damaged. The Hedyphagetica is written in hexameters, but differs from the Annales in regards to "metrical practices"; this difference is largely due to each works' distinct subject matter.

The titles Praecepta and Protrepticus were likely used to refer to the same (possibly exhortatory) work. However, given this work's almost non-existent nature (only the word pannibus—an "unusual" form of the word pannis, meaning "rags"—is preserved in the work of the Latin grammarian Charisius), this position is extremely difficult to verify.

The Saturae is a collection of about thirty lines from satirical poems—making it the first extant instance of Roman satire. These lines are written in a variety of poetic metres. The poems in this collection "were mostly concerned with practical wisdom, often driving home a lesson with the help of a fable."

Ennius's Scipio was a work (possibly a panegyric poem) that apparently celebrated the life and deeds of Scipio Africanus. Hardly anything remains of this work, and what is preserved is embedded in the works of others. Unfortunately, "no quotation of [Scipio] supplies a context". Some have proposed that the work was written before the Annales, and others have said that the work was written after Scipio's 201 BC triumph that followed the Battle of Zama (202 BC).

The Sota was a poem, potentially of some length, named after the Greek poet Sotades. The work, which followed a metre established by Sotades known as the "Sotadeus", concerned itself with a number of disparate topics and ideas.

== Editions ==
- Quinto Ennio. Le opere minori, Vol. I. Praecepta, Protrepticus, Saturae, Scipio, Sota. Ed., tr., comm. Alessandro Russo. Pisa: Edizioni ETS, 2007 (Testi e studi di cultura classica, 40).
- Warmington, E. H. (1935). Ennius (Q. Ennius). Remains of Old Latin. Edited by Eric Herbert Warmington. Vol. 2: Ennius and Caecilius. Cambridge: Harvard University Press.

== See also ==
- Latin literature
- List of ancient Romans
- Prosody (Latin)

== Footnotes ==
=== Bibliography ===
- Aicher, Peter (Summer 1989). "Ennius' Dream of Homer". The American Journal of Philology. 110 (2): 227–232. doi:10.2307/295173. JSTOR 295173.
- Braund, D. C. (1982). "Three Hellenistic Personages: Amynander, Prusias II, Daphidas". The Classical Quarterly. 32 (2): 350–357. doi:10.1017/S0009838800026537. ISSN 1471-6844. JSTOR 638575.
- Čulik-Baird, Hannah (2019). "STAGING ROMAN SLAVERY IN THE SECOND CENTURY BCE". Ramus. 48 (2): 174–197. doi:10.1017/rmu.2019.16. ISSN 0048-671X.
- Editors of Encyclopædia Britannica (10 February 2016). "Ennius". Encyclopædia Britannica Online.
- La Barbera, Sandro (26 August 2014). "Ennius". Oxford Bibliographies. Oxford University Press. doi:10.1093/obo/9780195389661-0172. ISBN 9780195389661.
- Goldberg, Sander M.; Manuwald, Gesine (8 January 2018), Fragmentary Republican Latin, Volume II: Ennius: Dramatic Fragments. Minor Works, Loeb Classical Library, Harvard University Press, ISBN 9780674997141
- Jocelyn, H.D. (1967), The Tragedies of Ennius: The Fragments Edited with an Introduction and Commentary, Cambridge: Cambridge University Press
- Manuwald, Gesine (11 August 2015). "Editing Roman (Republican) Tragedy: Challenges and Possible Solutions". In Harrison, George W.M. (ed.). Brill's Companion to Roman Tragedy. The Netherlands: Brill. doi:10.1163/9789004284784. ISBN 978-90-04-28478-4.
- Merry, William Walter, ed. (1891). Selected Fragments of Roman Poetry: From the Earliest Times of the Republic to the Augustan Age. Oxford, UK: Clarendon Press.
- Richlin, Amy (2017), MacDonald, Carolyn; Padilla Peralta, Dan-el; Loar, Matthew P. (eds.), "The Traffic in Shtick", Rome, Empire of Plunder: The Dynamics of Cultural Appropriation, Cambridge: Cambridge University Press, pp. 169–193, doi:10.1017/9781108290012.011, ISBN 978-1-108-41842-3
- Smith, William (1852). "Rudiae". A Smaller Classical Dictionary. London, England: John Murray.
- Webster, T. B. L. (1965). "The "Andromeda" of Euripides". Bulletin of the Institute of Classical Studies (12). Wiley: 29–33. ISSN 0076-0730.
