= Translations of the Odyssey =

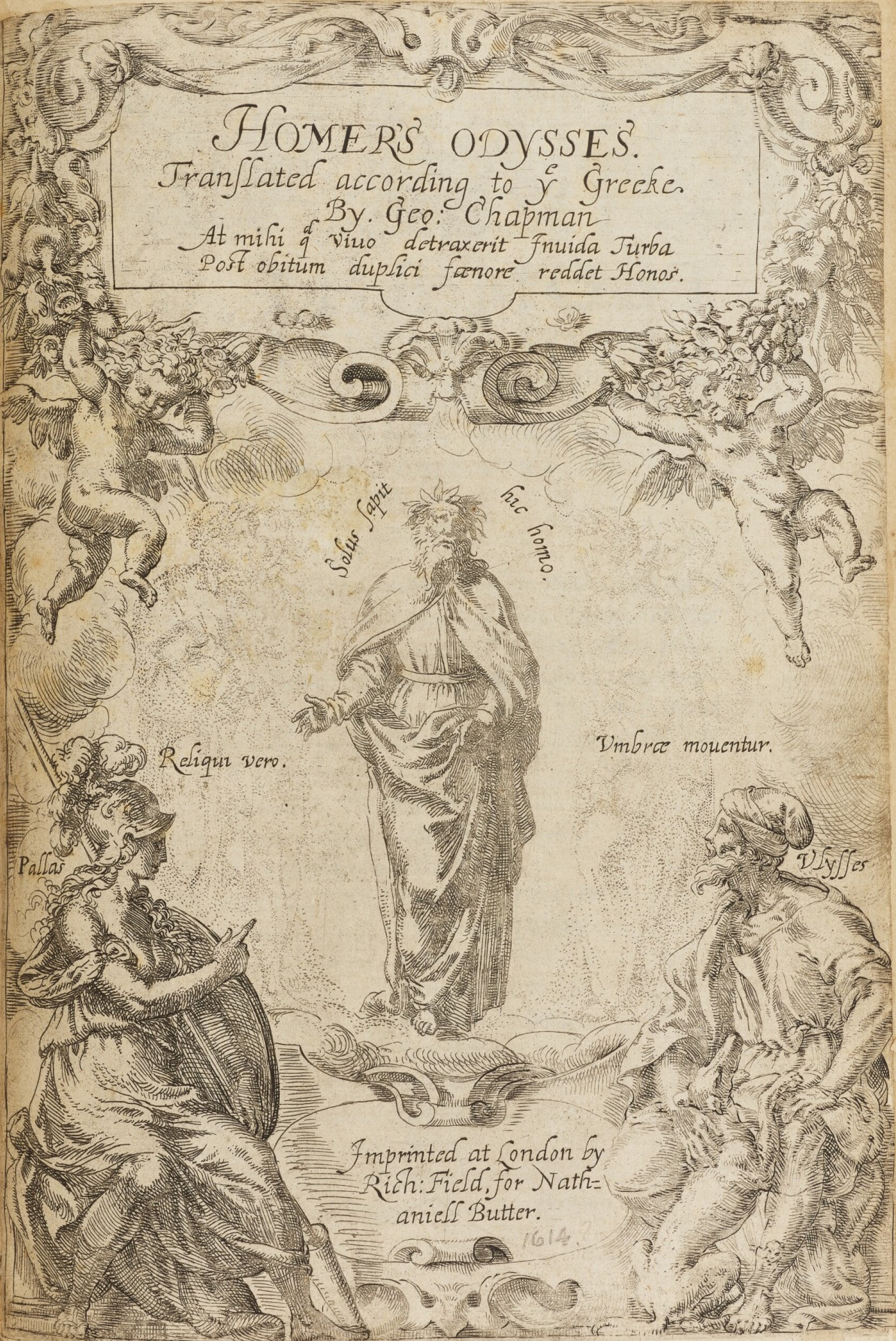
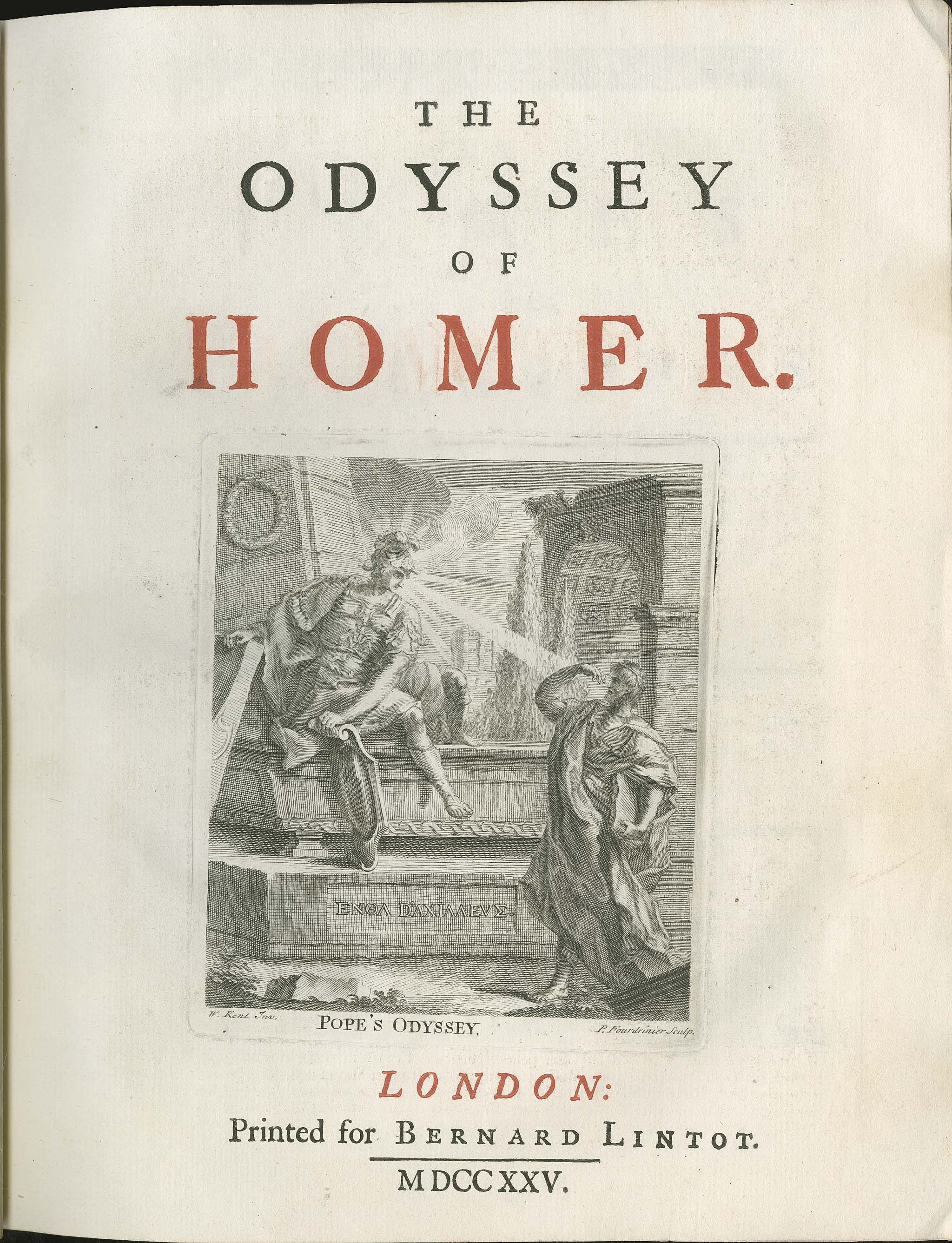
Frontispieces to the English translations of George Chapman (left) and Alexander Pope (right)

The Odyssey, an epic poem of ancient Greek literature attributed to Homer, has a long history of translation. The inaccessibility of Homeric Greek to most readers has driven continued interest in translations, which have played a crucial role in the epic's cultural penetration through adaptation, selective reading, and linguistic transformation. The artificial literary nature of Homeric Greek presents some challenges for translators. Approaches to translation range from literal equivalence—attempts to replicate the formal meaning of the original text—to dynamic or communicative equivalence, which tries to translate the cultural context; translators also differ in their preferences for prose or rhyme schemes, with some opting for intermediary variants such as free verse and blank verse.

The earliest known translation of Odysseus' travels is Livius Andronicus' Latin Odusia (3rd century BCE)—surviving only in fragments, it was one of the first Latin literary texts. Threatened with disappearance during the literary hiatus at the end of the classical age, the Odyssey was cherished and preserved in the Byzantine Empire, as a Greek text; translations were made into Georgian and possibly Syriac, but Homer was left out of the Greek-to-Arabic translation movement. The Odyssey was rediscovered by Renaissance humanists, who worked on new Latin translations. The earliest known version into any post-classical vernacular may have been Simon Schaidenreisser's German one (1537). Later notable translations include George Chapman's English versions in the early 17th century; Johann Heinrich Voss' influential 18th-century German translations that influenced development of the German language; Anne Dacier's French prose versions, published within the historical context of a French artistic debate; and Alexander Pope's 1720s English translation in heroic couplets.

Criticized by both neoclassicists and romantics for its perceived imperfections, the Odyssey was nevertheless widely circulated, and functioned as a long-term project for noted authors in their respective national vernaculars—in the 19th-century, complete translations were made by Manuel Odorico Mendes (Portuguese), Federico Baraibar (Spanish), and George Coșbuc (Romanian); Iakovos Polylas produced a retranslation of the epic into Modern Greek. The 20th century brought a mixture of translation and modernist reinterpretation, as with Ezra Pound's Cantos; translations in classical form were also encouraged, as samples of cultural prestige, by authoritarian or totalitarian regimes on the right and left. The same period also produced innovations such as E. V. Rieu's accessible prose translation for Penguin Classics, and translations in minority languages, such as Moshe Ha-Elion's translation in Judaeo-Spanish or William Neill's in Scots.

== Translational approaches ==
The language of the Homeric epics is inaccessible to the vast majority of readers, but interest in them, and related stories, remains quite strong. Susan Bassnett suggests that they owe their cultural penetration to adaptation, selective reading, and translation itself. Richard Armstrong argues that modern editions of the poems mislead readers into believing there was a true "original" text—he says that in reality, translational reinterpretation is a central feature of the epic genre. Argentine essayist Jorge Luis Borges was a pioneer in analyzing the translations of the Odyssey: in a 1957 essay, he defined the whole corpus as an "international library", noting its particular relevance to the development of English literature. Formal translation studies appeared as an academic discipline in the 1970s, but interest in translational scholarship increased substantially in the early twenty-first century. Earlier academic work relied on individual case studies, but systematic analysis in the twenty-first century have opened new interpretations and theoretical frameworks.

Armstrong summarises the traditional understanding of translational approaches:

- Literal translation (or "literal equivalence") is the replacement of source words with equivalent language from the target. Translators aim to replicate the expression and formal meaning of the original text. There are challenges with this approach. Firstly, Homeric Greek was never used by real people—it was an artificial literary language (Kunstsprache). Some words also lose connotative meanings that are lost when translated literally. (Note: Armstrong provides an example: "[...] the word κοίρανος means something like "king, ruler or leader" in a poetic context [...] but these are not workaday words, despite their denotative simplicity. To translate κοίρανος simply as "king, ruler" already shaves off a level of nuance, the grandeur of an old word for – from the perspectives of both a fifth-century BCE Athenian [...] – a defunct institution.")
- Dynamic or communicative equivalence, or "sense-for-sense translation", involves preserving the overall effect and purpose of the original text rather than finding direct analogues for words or maintaining sentence structure.

Spanish scholar Javier Franco Aixelá observed in 2012 that: "the Odyssey, or rhymed poetry in general, was translated mostly in rhymed verse in the past and mostly in prose or free verse today", noting that this is due to "the conditions of reception of the society for which it is translated. [...] translating the Odyssey into epic verse is not at all impossible, although it may be socially inconvenient in 21st-century Spain." Different formats of translations also allow secondary authors to introduce their own interpretations into the epic. That issue was highlighted by Edith Hall, who noted that a history of Homeric versions also teaches one "to be wary of translators, convinced that they understand the moral outlines of the story and have often imposed meanings of their own".

== Classical antiquity ==
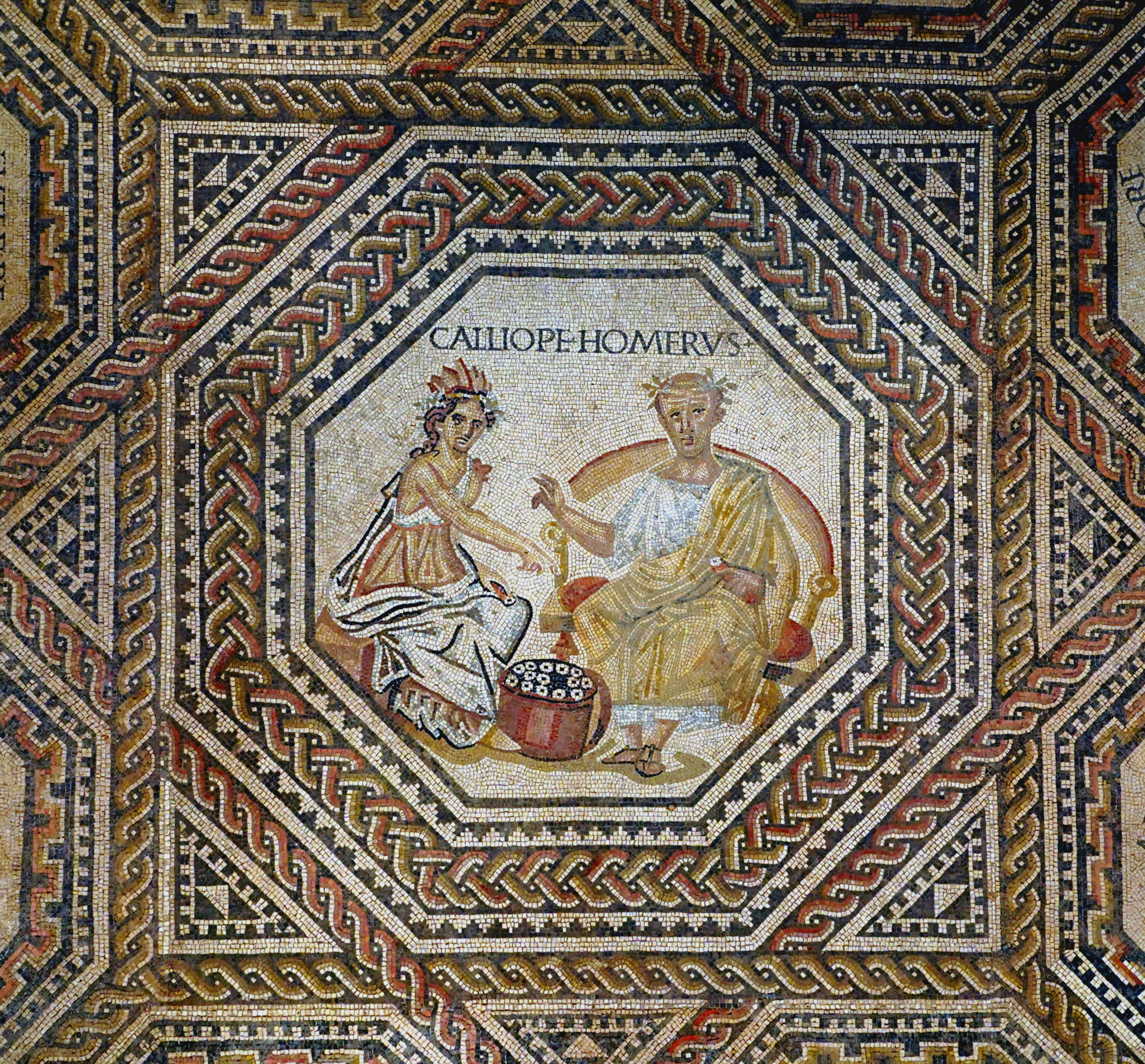
Homer and Calliope, as depicted in the Roman mosaic at Vichten

The Odyssey has a documented translation history stretching back to antiquity. This tradition was itself carried into legend by the 1st century AD, when Dio Chrysostom claimed that the peoples of Classical India had integrated translations from the Odyssey into their own folklore. The ancient conception of translation differs from modern perspectives, (Note: Siobhán McElduff says their terminology for translation was very broad, and none had the modern meaning of "translate": exprimo (squeeze out, press, translate); interpretor (explain, understand, interpret), muto (exchange, transform, translate); transfero (carry from place to place, transfer, translate; the Latin verb from which "translate" originates); and verto and its compound converto (revolve, turn, overturn, translate).") although the practices and customs were sometimes the same. In the period, the epics were named by their first lines—a practice that indicates their widespread fame. Livius Andronicus' Latin translation, Odusia, is one of the first Latin literary texts. He is widely regarded as the creator of the Latin literary tradition, and introduced a model of the epic genre to Roman society. He changed the metre of the Homeric Greek from dactylic hexameter to Saturnian, which may have been a decision calculated to foster interest in the epic among Roman readers. He may also have used his translation as a text in his own school.

Livius was translating a text of foreign origin, but it was easier for Romans to accept because it seemed Roman. Additionally, its genre was less likely to be embroiled in the Roman politics that a historical epic could cause. Not much is known about Odusia. The first line is faithful to the Homeric Greek, even matching its word order. He renders the adjective polytropon (Note: This word has been interpreted in many ways. McElduff gives it as many-minded; Thomas E. Jenkins relates it as "of many turns"; Irene de Jong provides "with many turns of the mind". It connotes intellectual curiosity, cunning, and being well travelled.) as versutus (lit. 'clever'), and invokes the Camenae instead of the Muses. Surviving fragments have a different tone to the Homeric Greek; Livius' also translocated some imagery from the Iliad into his Odyssey. Some evidence suggests that he condensed the twenty-four constituent parts into one, which would mean it was not a full translation.

As Hall remarks, "the two Homeric epics formed the basis of the education of everyone in ancient Mediterranean society from at least the seventh century BCE". Michael von Albrecht says Odusia was "beaten into" a young Horace (65–8 BC) as part of his education. Horace's Ars Poetica (lit. 'Art of Poetry') relates how to translate properly, describing it as the process of making communal material private. He thought poorly of literal translation. Horace translated the opening lines of the Odyssey twice, with very different outputs. In Ars Poetica, he summarises the plot in a single line; in Epistles he uses nine. His Ars Poetica translation omits polytropon entirely—McElduff describes this choice as Horace "correcting" Livius and demonstrating how to make a Greek text into a Roman one.

There is a hexametric Odyssea that is a distinct from Livius' Odusia. Entitled Odusia Latina hexametris non multo post Ennium exarata in its modern edition, it survives only in four fragments. It may represent an epitomization or more likely a set of excerpts of the Odyssey, which, unlike the Iliad, frequently circulated as selections of excerpts. Edward Courtney, calling it Livius Refictus, considers it a reworking of Livius into hexameters under the influence of Ennius (fl. c. 200 BC). All the fragments are quotes from Priscian, citing Livius in Odyssea (or Odissia). Neither the original Odyssey nor Livius's Odusia were divided into books, but the hexametric Oydssea was. The citations of Festus and Charisius to an Odyssia vetus (old Odyssey) are attempts to distinguish the original work of Livius from its hexametric competitor. The Homeric translations of Polybius and Attius Labeo have not survived. Labeo's translations are known from the scholia of Persius (32–62 BC), who mocked him for his literal translations of both epics. (Note: The only surviving line of Labeo's Iliad is relayed by Persius' commentary; this material was probably chosen by Persius because it was literal across multiple axes: word choice, sentence structure, and literary technique.)

== Post-classical and Renaissance ==
Beyond classical antiquity and into the Byzantine era, the spread of the Greek language—and the consequent internal translation of the Homeric texts as it spread—played a central role in maintaining the Odyssey's relevancy and esteemed status. Armstrong says both epics may have dropped from knowledge otherwise, using Beowulf as an example of this fate. Within the realm covered by Greek Byzantine culture, the epic required no translation, since "an educated Byzantine would have had no difficulty understanding the language of Homer." Nonetheless, John Tzetzes, a 12th-century grammarian who ventured to uncover the obscured or supposedly esoteric meanings of Homer's poetry, once referred to his project as a "translation of Homer's verses". While it participated in the transmission of the Greek Classics and had an independent translation movement, the Arab world was generally ignorant of Homer "beyond that he was a poet." In the 10th century, at the height of the Abbasid Caliphate, Abu Sulayman Sijistani used Homer as a literary character, attributing him a number of aphorisms; "a few details" were added to this portrait by al-Qifti some three centuries later. In the early 20th century, Arab scholars disputed each over the extent to which an 11th-century poet, al-Ma'arri, may have been inspired by the Odyssey (which implicitly suggests that he would have known the Homeric text in translation).

The Odyssey may have been translated into Syriac, but the evidence is inconclusive. The 13th-century historian Barhebraeus records that Theophilus of Edessa (fl. c. 780) translated "the two books of the poet Homer about the conquest of the city Ilion", which seemingly refers to the Iliad and Odyssey, since only the Odyssey mentions the fall of Troy. Syriac quotations from Homer are found in the Rhetoric of Antony of Tagrit of 825 and one might be from the Odyssey. The Kingdom of Georgia, located on the margin of the Byzantine cultural realm, also had its own translations of both the Iliad and the Odyssey into its native language; these were completed in the 11th or 12th centuries by an anonymous author. Nicholas Sigeros provided Petrarch, a leading poet of the Italian Renaissance, with manuscripts of the Iliad and the Odyssey in 1354. (Note: Petrarch wrote in a letter: "Homer is mute to me, or, rather, I am deaf to him. Still, I enjoy just looking at him and often, embracing him and sighing, I say, 'O great man, how eagerly would I listen to you.'") He unsuccessfully attempted to learn Greek, and is believed to have been annotating his copy until the moment of his death. Petrarch's correspondent Giovanni Boccaccio persuaded the monk Leontius Pilatus to produce translations in Latin prose—he finished the Iliad, but only came close to finishing the Odyssey. Petrarch himself panned this version, expressing disappointment over its "obscurity and crudeness". More or less fragmentary translations were made by other early exponents of Renaissance humanism, including Coluccio Salutati, Leonardo Bruni, and Poliziano.

In or about 1462, Francesco Griffolini made a new paraphrastic prose translation into Latin for Pope Pius II. The first printed edition of the Odyssey in Greek was published in Milan 1488 by Demetrios Chalkokondyles, a Greek scholar resident in the Republic of Florence. Other noted editions appeared for the Latin version, beginning with that printed by Johann Schott of Strasbourg; new Latin versions or adaptations were put out by Andreas Divus and Raffaele Maffei. Divus' translation was in a simplified version of Latin, and did not include with it the Homeric Greek text. A word-for-word rendition, it remained highly popular during those decades, although similar translations by other writers remained in constant circulation. For example, Maffei's translation in Latin prose was printed at several European cities in the late-15th and early-16th century, including Rome, Cologne and Antwerp. Printed translations for modern European languages surged in popularity in the 16th century; the inaugural book of this category was probably Simon Schaidenreisser's German print of 1537. Many of this group were only partial translations; parts eight through twelve of the poem (Odysseus' account of his adventures) were the most commonly translated, which Jessica Wolfe says indicates that they were "read for recreation and not serious study". Most of these were written in Latin.

Renaissance readers particularly emphasised elements of colonial expansion and sea travel. Running parallel to the late Renaissance, the Age of Discovery brought Europeans and their cultures in contact with non-seafaring empires, including Ashikaga Japan. Based on unusual similarities, scholars such as Tsubouchi Shōyō and James T. Araki have proposed that the 16th-century Japanese epic of Yuriwaka is partly inspired by echoes from the Odyssey; Araki theorizes that the Homeric poem was circulated in Japan by the Jesuits, and then adapted by kōwakamai performers. In 1550, Gonzalo Pérez, a high-ranking bureaucrat of the Spanish Empire, published in Salamanca his draft of the poem, which in all ran at 21,944 verses; named Ulixea (rather than the updated Odisea), it is viewed as the first translation of that poem not just in Spanish, but in any Romance language. Philosopher Dirck Coornhert, active in the Habsburg Netherlands, published his Dutch translation in stages, from 1561—a "rather free" interpretation, it was done mainly from a Latin manuscript.

== Early modern ==
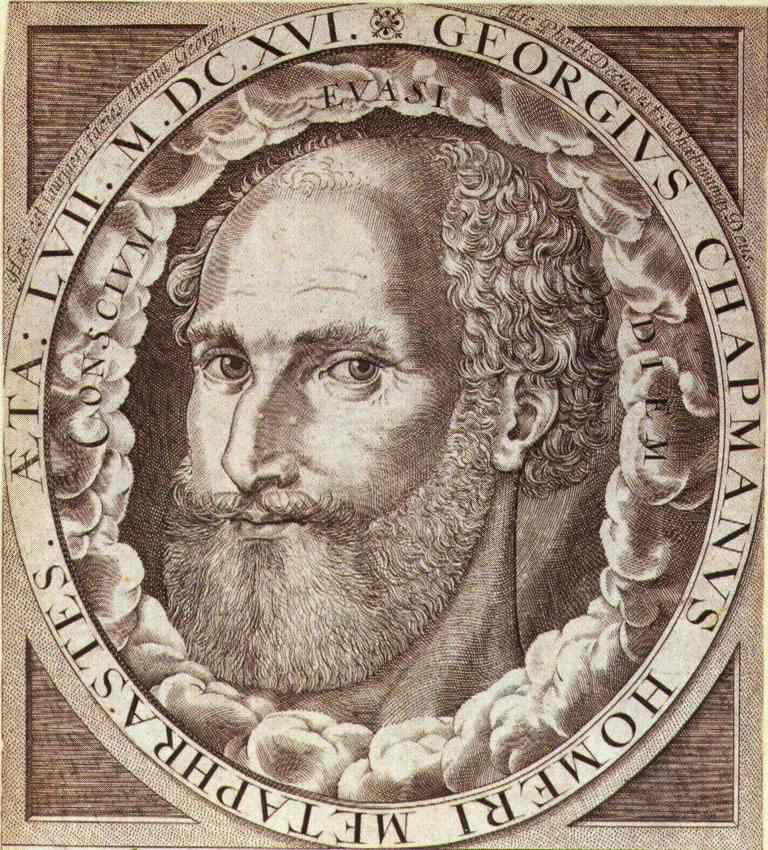
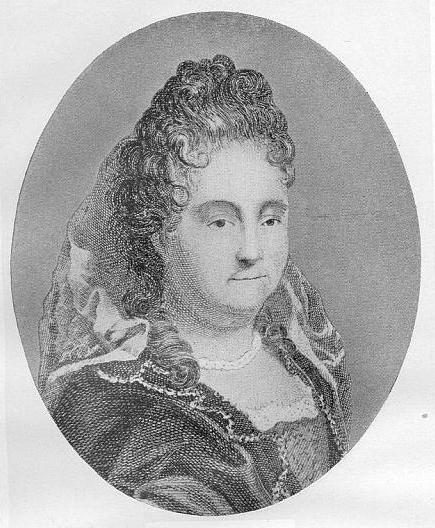
George Chapman, who completed the first English translations of the Iliad and Odyssey; Anne Dacier, whose French translation influenced later versions by Antoine Houdar de la Motte and Alexander Pope

Arthur Hall was the first to translate Homer into English: his translation of the Iliad's first ten books, which was published in 1581, relied upon a French version. George Chapman became the first writer to complete a translation of both epics into English after finishing his translation of the Odyssey. These translations were published together in 1616, but were serialised earlier, and became the first modern translations to enjoy widespread success. He worked on Homeric translation for most of his life, and his work later inspired John Keats' sonnet "On First Looking into Chapman's Homer" (1816). It was similarly used as the narrative basis for Charles Lamb's retelling for children (1808), itself later woven into James Joyce's Ulysses (1922).

The first completed Italian Odyssey, written by Girolamo Baccelli in free verse, was published in 1582. The first completed French translation was composed in alexandrine couplets by Salomon Certon and printed in 1604. It lost public favour following the Académie Française's language reforms in the 1630s and 1640s. Other fragmentary translations were authored by Claude Boitet (1617), Paul Pellisson (1650), Jean Racine (1662), Achille La Valterie (1681), and, in the 1690s, by François Fénelon (who penned his own rendition from portions of the Odyssey as an homage to the Duke of Burgundy). Of these, Fénelon's contribution is regarded as highly innovative, for its "particularly drastic" reinventions and cuts in the original text. Johann Heinrich Voss' 18th-century translations of the epics are among his most celebrated works, (Note: Voss produced translations of other classics, too, and eventually revised his version of Odyssey, but that received a less favourable reception.) and profoundly influenced the German language. Johann Wolfgang von Goethe called Voss' translations transformational masterpieces that initiated German interest in Hellenism. Anne Dacier composed her Iliad and Odyssey in French prose, (Note: Dacier's Iliad was highly allegorical, and was published to positive reception; she provided historical and linguistic commentary alongside it.) appearing in 1711 and 1716, respectively; it was the standard French Homeric translation until the late 18th century. Antoine Houdar de la Motte, who could not read Ancient Greek, used Dacier's Iliad to produce his own contracted version, criticising Homer in the preface. His argument that he had improved upon Homer angered Dacier, who penned a 600-page rebuttal.

Dacier's translation of the Odyssey profoundly influenced the 1720s translation by Alexander Pope, which he produced for financial reasons years after his Iliad. Dacier did not speak English and used a poor translation to read Pope's translation; she condemned it in a prefatory note to a new version of her Iliad. Pope, an admirer of Dacier, was hurt; she died in 1720 before he could respond. Pope translated twelve books himself and divided the other twelve between Elijah Fenton and William Broome; the latter also provided annotations. They were composed in heroic couplets—paired rhyming lines of iambic pentameter. This information eventually leaked, harming his reputation and profits. Armstrong describes a "battle of English poetic forms" following Pope's translation: William Cowper's translations rendered the epics in blank verse, the non-rhyming schema used by John Milton for Paradise Lost. Armstrong describes this battle continuing into the 19th century.

A new Italian translator of the Iliad, Melchiorre Cesarotti, proposed in the 1780s that the Odyssey was not worth the effort. In Cesarotti's reading, the story had the outward characteristics of a puerile "farce", rather than of a serious work of art. Such critiques remained marginal, and both Homeric epics continued to be rendered into the consolidating vernaculars of Europe, throughout the Age of Revolution. A "highly musical" version of the Odyssey was penned by Cesarotti's compatriot, Ippolito Pindemonte (1753–1828); he accepted some of the prevailing critiques of his day, introducing "moralizing interventions" in his treatment of the narrative. Though he produced his own translation of the first book of the Odyssey in the 1820s, Giacomo Leopardi embraced a Romantic disapproval of Homer, whom he regarded as inferior to "Ossian".

== Victorian and modernist ==
In the 1810s, the initial four sections of the poem were translated into Swedish by Axel Gabriel Sjöström, who was active in the Grand Duchy of Finland. This effort inspired Elias Lönnrot, who in the 1850s completed a larger and more literal translation of the Odyssey's sixth book into Finnish; he used hexametre, which was suited to Finnish prosody. Before his death in 1852, Sveinbjörn Egilsson had completed the standard edition of the Odyssey in Icelandic, which borrowed heavily from Old Norse to match Homer's classical tone. Pérez's Spanish translation was the only such version of the poem until 1837, when Mariano Esparza of Mexico published his own—followed fifty years later by a more professional version, the work of Spanish classicist Federico Baraibar. The first Portuguese-language Odyssey was translated by the Brazilian journalist and politician Manuel Odorico Mendes (1799–1864), who also produced the first Portuguese versions of the Iliad and Virgil's entire poetic corpus, including the Aeneid. Odorico combined the approaches of preceding Portuguese poets. The metre used was the decasyllable—an analogue to iambic pentameter―also employed by the 16th-century poet Luís de Camões in Os Lusíadas. One controversial feature was the use of composite words, borrowed from Pindemonte, for the translation of epithets and other adjectives. According to Leonardo Antunes, the metre, together with the use of composite words, "created a translation that was harder to read than the actual Greek and Latin texts".

Still in the 18th century, Bernardo Zamagna of Ragusa produced a widely circulated neo-Latin rendition of the Homeric poem. The early 19th century brought Homeric studies to other areas of East-Central and Eastern Europe. Possibly the first attempt to complete a Romanian version was that of Ioan Barac in Austrian Transylvania (a manuscript dated to 1816); Alecu Beldiman of Moldavia completed an all-prose translation at some point before 1837 (his remained a manuscript version, as was the fragmentary version done in 1852 by Wallachia's Alexandru Odobescu). In 1881, the adolescent George Coșbuc received a prize for his own Romanian version, inaugurating his long career as a translator of the classics. Inspired by Italian versions, Coșbuc produced in all over 2,200 stanzas in rhyming verse, using either hendecasyllables or decasyllables, which made the text widely readable.

The first Odyssey in the Russian language may have been Vasily Zhukovsky's 1849 translation in hexametre. It was upheld as a landmark in Russian culture and Europe's entire literary tradition, being applauded by contemporaries as a "resurrection of Homer"; Nikolai Gogol argued that its moral lessons would revive and nurture Russian conservatism, steering the country back into a "patriarchal, ancient mode of life". Around that time, the first rendition into Hungarian was penned by István Szabó, followed by a succession of other translators—including Emil Ponori Thewrewk and János Csengery. In 1875, Iakovos Polylas resorted to retranslating the epic into Modern Greek—one of several such projects aimed making Homer readable in his native culture. Awareness of the Odyssey also spread about the Ottoman Empire, but no Ottoman Turkish translation was published—largely because the local intellectuals knew enough French to read it in French translations; by contrast, the Iliad had one such a rendition, presented in 1886 by Naim Frashëri. The reemergence of Ukrainian literature within the Russian Empire and Austria-Hungary was accompanied by a surge in Ukrainian-language translation from the classics, with Oleksii Navrotskyi, Panteleimon Kulish, Alexander Potebnja, Ivan Franko and Lesya Ukrainka all producing fragmentary renditions of the Odyssey. A full version was put out in 1887 by Petro Nishchynsky, and published in Lviv by Franko himself.

In 1867, Leconte de Lisle made "the first modern translation" of the poem into French. It marked a break with the European Homeric standard, which had generally favoured Latin names for the characters, by introducing characters under approximate renditions of their Greek names. Late in the Victorian era, Andrew Lang was attracted by Homeric themes and penned his own prose retelling of the Odyssey. The subsequent emergence of modernist literature allowed various authors to engage in translation as conscious reinterpretation; in 1900, Samuel Butler completed new prose versions of both Homeric epics, which were mainly attempts to illustrate his contentious claim that their original author was in fact female. A partial translation of the Odyssey's 11th part opens The Cantos, by the American poet Ezra Pound. Pound's translation was based on Andreas Divus' faithful word-for-word Latin Odyssey. Massimo Cè writes that that Divus' faithful Latin translation has led some scholars to conclude that "we can treat both equally as source texts, with Divus acting as a window onto Homer", but Cè argues that, while Pound's language, meaning and metre is indebted to Divus' version, they differ substantially from the Homeric Greek Odyssey. According to Hall, Pound made "his own version of [a] poet's traditional homage to the Odyssey as the very text that he rightly believed constitutes the source of the Western poetic subject." Moreover, Pound's translation mingled the conventions of Latin and Anglo-Saxon poetry.

In the early 20th century, several definitive translations appeared in languages that had already provided experiments in translation, as well as some new ventures (including Provençal, in 1907, Slovenian, in 1911, and Serbo-Croatian, in 1915). Linguist Luis Segalá y Estalella produced a new prose version in Spanish (1912), which remained highly popular, while a "careful" rendition into Catalan verse was completed by Carles Riba in 1919. Informed by Joan Maragall's modern poetry, Riba's work endures as one of the most recognizable contributions to Catalan literature. Norwegian renditions were completed by Arne Garborg in 1918 and Peter Østbye in 1922. A Lithuanian Odyssey, by Jeronimas Ralys, came out in 1921 and again in 1937.

== Contemporary ==
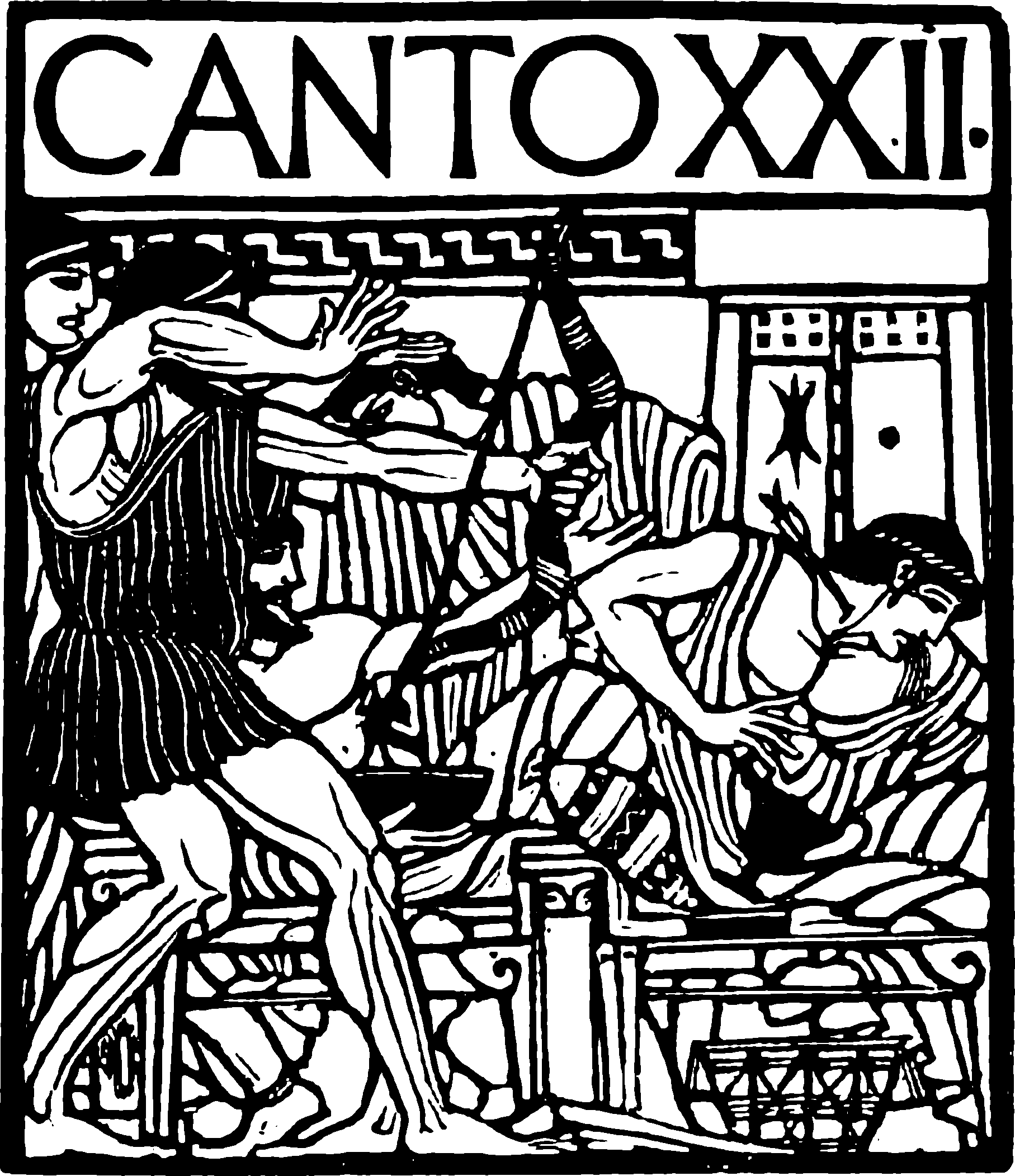
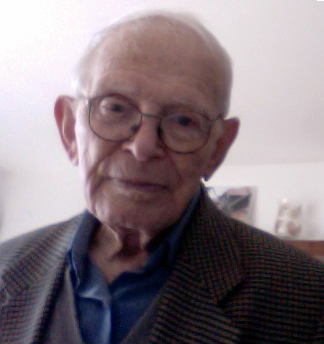
Odysseus killing Penelope's suitors—illustration by Adolfo de Carolis for Ettore Romagnoli's Italian translation; Moshe Ha-Elion, who translated the Odyssey into Judaeo-Spanish

The first full version in Romanian, done by the Aromanian scholar George Murnu, appeared in print in 1924, the same year that Józef Wittlin completed his Polish rendition. Wittlin revised his own work in several editions, down to 1957, but overall maintained his quasi-political focus—which was to uphold Homer as an inspiration for the "Young Poland" school of writers, and to integrate the "old diction of folk ballads." The French Homeric fund was augmented by a celebrated translation, completed in 1925 by Victor Bérard. Formally printed in rhythmical prose, it concealed French alexandrines, and showed Bérard's direct familiarity with the Homeric landscape, which he had researched during his travels. Ten years later, another version was co-authored by Médéric Dufour and Jeanne Raison.

In succession to Pound, T. E. Lawrence, made famous by his participation in the Arab Revolt, dedicated himself to producing another English prose adaptation of the epic—feeling that only prose could still make its subject-matter approachable, and that his own soldierly career gave him a unique perspective on this. The Lawrence text, published in 1932, was an indirect inspiration for composer Inglis Gundry, who produced his own verse translation, then set it to music as an opera. In the 1940s, E. V. Rieu set out to make Homer accessible to new readers. Rieu's Odyssey was written in English prose and produced as the first entry in the mass-market paperback Penguin Classics series, for which he was the founding editor. Bassnett describes this release within the context of diminished interest in formal study of classical languages. Rieu's translations were very successful; his prose approach inspired others in the post-war period, but effectively discouraged any "aspiring verse translators of the Odyssey". One exception was another American, Robert Fitzgerald, who "worked with dictionaries in order to analyse every resonance before translating the words, as he insisted, into another poem altogether."

During the 1930s, Ettore Romagnoli completed an Italian Odyssey in "barbaric hexametre", "offering an effective rendering of the original"; his contribution was largely ignored in later decades, due to Romagnoli's public association with the fascist governments. Ahmet Cevat Emre began working on a Turkish translation during the same decade, at the behest of Mustafa Kemal Atatürk, who wanted to raise his country's prestige in Europe; the result was a two-volume edition, published in 1941–1942 by the Turkish Language Association. During the Second World War, portions of the Odyssey were again reworked into French by Robert Brasillach, whose overall contribution was later obscured by his association with Vichy France. Published posthumously in his anthology of Greek poetry (around the same time as another translation, by Philippe Jaccottet), the Brasillach effort came to be admired for his "perfect literary fidelity", and also noted for incorporating modern influences from Paul Claudel. Augusts Ģiezens published a Latvian version in 1943, and Gábor Devecseri completed a new Hungarian text in 1947.

In postwar Italy, Cesare Pavese directed the effort for "an almost literal translation, line-by-line". He commissioned for this end Rosa Calzecchi Onesti, who published her version, done in rhythmical prose, in 1963 (thirteen years after her version of the Iliad). The Odyssey was by then being translated into some languages for the first time, with various projects carried out inside the Soviet Union and the Eastern Bloc. In 1955, the Romanian communist regime vetted a people's edition of the Odyssey as translated by Eugen Lovinescu, published at the same time as Murnu's Iliad. Together, the two books sold an unusually high 50,000 copies by 1958. Miroslav Okál produced a Slovak-language Odyssey in 1962, while a standardized Estonian edition saw print in 1963, at the same time as the first complete Ukrainian translation—the latter authored by Borys Ten, a former prisoner in the Gulag. A complete Odyssey in Serbian was published in 1966 by Miloš N. Đurić, and was immediately regarded as a major stylistic accomplishment. Unusually, the poem appears to have never been translated or published in North Korea, though Lim Hak-su produced three successive Korean translations of the Iliad; this indifference replicates a similar pattern in the earlier colonial Chōsen, where "Homer's Odyssey was scarcely dealt with". A Korean Odyssey only appeared in 1991.

Another Turkish version appeared in 1970 as a collaboration between poets Azra Erhat and Abdul Kadir; this was one year ahead of Shigeichi Kure's widely used Japanese translation, noted for its attempts at preserving Homer's wordplay in furigana. No Arabic translations had yet appeared by 2009, though the epic had been "paraphrased" in prose by Anbara Salam Khalidi (1979) and Aiman Adil (2008). José Manuel Pabón gave a new Spanish translation in verse. Published in 1982, this work was influenced by modernist poetry, and by Riba, in its use of "accentual hexametres". Luo Niansheng began translating the first Chinese-language Iliad in the late 1980s, but he died before completing it; his student Wang Huansheng finished the project; Wang's Odyssey followed in 1997. William Neill's translation of parts of the Odyssey into Scots language (Tales frae the Odyssey O Homer), published in 1991 by the Saltire Society, was inspired by Gavin Douglas' 16th-century translation. Hardwick uses Neill's work as an example of a translation "enhancing the target language and culture". Two new translations of the Odyssey into Modern Hebrew appeared in the 21st century: Abraham Arouetty rendered the epic in literary prose (2012), and Aharon Shabtai in verse (2014). Moshe Ha-Elion—a survivor of the death marches and Auschwitz concentration camp—translated the Odyssey into Judaeo-Spanish, a language with very few speakers. His hexameter composition was published in two parts from 2011 to 2014.

== See also ==
- English translations of Homer

== Bibliography ==
=== Books ===
- Albrecht, Michael von (1997), A History of Roman Literature, Brill, ISBN 978-90-04-10711-3
- Armstrong, Richard H.; Lianeri, Alexandra, eds. (2025). A Companion to the Translation of Classical Epic (1st ed.). Wiley. ISBN 9781119094265.
  - Armstrong, Richard H. Introduction. In Armstrong & Lianeri (2025).
  - Lianeri, Alexandra. "Introduction to Part I: Conceptual Openings In and Through Epic Translation Histories". In Armstrong & Lianeri (2025).
  - Bassnett, Susan. "Defying the Odds: How Classical Epics Continue to Survive in the Modern World". In Armstrong & Lianeri (2025).
  - Hardwick, Lorna. "Between Translation and Reception: Reading and Writing Forward and Backward in Translations of Epic". In Armstrong & Lianeri (2025).
  - Armstrong, Richard H. (2025b). "The Fighting Words Business: Thoughts on Equivalence, Localization, and Epic in English Translation". In Armstrong & Lianeri (2025).
  - McElduff, Siobhán. "What is Translation in the Ancient World?". In Armstrong & Lianeri (2025).
  - Antunes, Leonardo. "From Scheria: An Emerging Tradition of Portuguese Translations of the Odyssey". In Armstrong & Lianeri (2025).
  - Candler Hayes, Julie. "Anne Dacier's Homer: Epic Force". In Armstrong & Lianeri (2025).
- Baines, Paul (2000). The Complete Critical Guide to Alexander Pope. Routledge. p. 25. ISBN 0-203-16993-X. OCLC 48139753.
- Baker, Mona; Saldanha, Gabriela, eds. (2009). Routledge Encyclopedia of Translation Studies. Routledge. ISBN 978-1-135-21113-4.
  - Hjørnager Pedersen, Viggo; Qvale, Per. "Danish and Norwegian tradition". In Baker & Saldanha (2009).
  - Connolly, David; Bacopoulou-Halls, Aliki. "Greek tradition". In Baker & Saldanha (2009).
  - Kunz, Keneva. "Icelandic tradition". In Baker & Saldanha (2009).
- Barnard, John (2003). Alexander Pope: The Critical Heritage. Hoboken: Taylor and Francis. ISBN 978-0-203-19423-2.
- Blänsdorf, Jürgen; Büchner, Karl; Morel, Willy, eds. (2011). Fragmenta poetarum Latinorum epicorum et lyricorum. De Gruyter.
- Browning, Robert (1992). "The Byzantines and Homer". In Lamberton, Robert; Keaney, John J. (eds.). Homer's Ancient Readers: The Hermeneutics of Greek Epic's Earliest Exegetes. Princeton University Press. ISBN 978-0-6916-5627-4.
- Clarke, Howard W. (1981). Homer's Readers: A Historical Introduction to the Iliad and the Odyssey. University of Delaware Press.
- Conrad, L. I. (1999). "Varietas Syriaca: Secular and Scientific Culture in the Christian Communities of Syria after the Arab Conquest". In G. J. Reinink; Alexander Cornelis Klugkist (eds.). After Bardaisan: Studies on Continuity and Change in Syriac Christianity in Honour of Professor Han J. W. Drijvers. Peeters. pp. 85–105.
- Courtney, Edward, ed. (1993). The Fragmentary Latin Poets. Oxford University Press.
- Daiber, Hans (2017). "The Syriac Tradition in the Early Islamic Era". In Ulrich Rudolph; Rotraud Hansberger; Peter Adamson (eds.). Philosophy in the Islamic World. Vol. 1: 8th–10th Centuries. Brill. pp. 74–94.
- Damrosch, Leopold (1987). The imaginative world of Alexander Pope. University of California Press. ISBN 978-0-520-05975-7.
- de Jong, Irene J. F. (2001). A Narratological Commentary on the Odyssey. Cambridge University Press. ISBN 978-0-521-46478-9.
- Falcone, Maria Jennifer; Schubert, Christoph, eds. (2021). Ilias Latina: Text, Interpretation, and Reception. Brill.
  - Cè, Massimo. "The Ilias Latina in the Context of Ancient Epitome Translation". In Falcone & Schubert (2021), pp. 39–66.
- Grafton, Anthony; Most, Glenn W.; Settis, Salvatore (2010). The Classical Tradition. The Belknap Press of Harvard University Press. ISBN 978-0-674-03572-0.
- Hall, Edith (2008). The Return of Ulysses: A Cultural History of Homer's Odyssey. I. B. Tauris & Co. ISBN 978-1-84511-575-3.
- Hickman, Miranda B.; Kozak, Lynn, eds. (2020). The Classics in Modernist Translation. Bloomsbury Academic. ISBN 978-1-350-04095-3.
  - Cè, Massimo. "Translating the Odyssey: Andreas Divus, Old English, and Ezra Pound's Canto I". In Hickman & Kozak (2020).
- Mariotti, Scaevola (1952). Livio Andronico e la traduzione artistica. Pubblicazione dell’Università di Urbino.
- McElduff, Siobhán (2013). Roman Theories of Translation: Surpassing the Source. Routledge. ISBN 978-0-415-81676-2.
- Pache, Corinne Ondine; Dué, Casey; Lupack, Susan; Lamberton, Robert, eds. (2020). The Cambridge Guide to Homer (1 ed.). Cambridge University Press. doi:10.1017/9781139225649. ISBN 978-1-139-22564-9.
  - Mavroudi, Maria. "Homer in Greece from the End of Antiquity: The Byzantine Reception of Homer and His Export to Other Cultures". In Pache et al. (2020).
  - Wolfe, Jessica. "Homer in Renaissance Europe (1488–1649)". In Pache et al. (2020).
  - Lawton, David. "Shakespeare and Homer". In Pache et al. (2020).
  - Newton, Richard M. "The Odyssey: An Overview". In Pache et al. (2020).
  - Jenkins, Thomas E. Introduction. In Pache et al. (2020).
- Possanza, D. Mark (2004). Translating the Heavens: Aratus, Germanicus and the Poetics of Latin Translation. Peter Lang.
- Pucci, Pietro (1987). Odysseus Polytropos: Intertextual Readings in the Odyssey and the Iliad. Cornell University Press.
- Schneider, Bernd; Meckelnborg, Christina, eds. (2011). Odyssea Homeri a Francisco Griffolino Aretino in Latinum translata: Die lateinische Odyssee-Übersetzung des Francesco Griffolini. Leiden: Brill.
- Stanford, W. B. (1968). The Ulysses Theme: A Study in the Adaptability of the Traditional Hero (2nd ed.). University of Michigan Press.
- Steiner, George (1975). After Babel: Aspects of Language and Translation. Oxford University Press.

=== Journals, news and web ===
- Araki, James T. (1978). "Yuriwaka and Ulysses. The Homeric Epics at the Court of Ōuchi Yoshitaka". Monumenta Nipponica. 33 (1): 1–36.
- Armstrong, Richard H. (2018). "Review of Homer: The Odyssey". Museum Helveticum. 75 (2): 225–226. ISSN 0027-4054. JSTOR 26831950.
- Berk Albachten, Özlem (2017). "The Myth of Troy as a Lieu de Mémoire: Turkish Cultural Memory and Translations of the Iliad in the 1950s". Classical Receptions Journal. 9 (2): 287–306.
- Berlan, Françoise (1990). "Fénelon traducteur et styliste: réécritures du chant V de l'Odyssée". Littératures Classiques. 13: 19–52.
- Bodniece, L.; Kučinskienė, A.; Lotman, M.-K. (2018). "Greek Proper Names in Ancient Literature Textbooks on the Example of Baltic Countries". Indo-European Linguistics and Classical Philology. 4: 291–304.
- Brammall, Sheldon (1 July 2018). "Review: George Chapman: Homer's Iliad". Translation and Literature. 27 (2). doi:10.3366/tal.2018.0339. ISSN 0968-1361. S2CID 165293864.
- Chiche, Didier (2010). "Traduire la poésie ― de la poésie antique à la poésie française". Gengo to Bunka. 14: 143–158.
- Cooper, David L. (2007). "Vasilii Zhukovskii as a Translator and the Protean Russian Nation". The Russian Review. 66 (2): 185–203. doi:10.1111/j.1467-9434.2007.00437.x. ISSN 0036-0341. JSTOR 20620532.
- Cronin, Michael (2012). "The rise of the reader and norms in twentieth-century English-language literary translation". Studies in Translatonal Theory and Practice.
- Curran, Jane V. (1996). "Wieland's Revival of Horace". International Journal of the Classical Tradition. 3 (2): 171–184. doi:10.1007/BF02677914. ISSN 1073-0508. JSTOR 30222268.
- Dănciulescu, Virgil (1958). "Comentarii. Cu privire la reeditarea clasicilor. Homer pentru cei mulți". Iașul Literar. IX (12): 65–70.
- Fay, H. C. (1952). "George Chapman's Translation of Homer's Iliad". Greece & Rome. 21 (63): 104–111. doi:10.1017/S0017383500011578. ISSN 0017-3835. JSTOR 640882. S2CID 161366016. Archived from the original on 31 December 2022.
- Fornaro, Maria (2011). "L'Ombra di Omero: ricezioni omeriche nelle letterature romanze". Sandalion. 32–33: 269–312.
- Franco Aixelá, Javier (Autumn 2012). "La teoría os hará libres". Vasos Comunicantes (43): 31–48.
- Gabela, Branko (6 February 1966). "Подухрат старог хеленисте: нови превод Илиаде и Одисеје". Politika. p. 18.
- García Gual, Carlos (2015). "La primera traducción de la Odisea". Cuadernos Hispanoamericanos (784): 128–133.
- Goldwyn, Adam (2017). "Theory and Method in John Tzetzes' Allegories of the Iliad and Allegories of the Odyssey". Scandinavian Journal of Byzantine and Modern Greek Studies (3): 141–171.
- Gray, James (1984). "Postscript to the Odyssey: Pope's Reluctant Debt to Milton". Milton Quarterly. 18 (4): 105–116. doi:10.1111/j.1094-348X.1984.tb00295.x. ISSN 0026-4326. JSTOR 24464409.
- Horváth, István Károly (1957). "Szemle. Gondolatok az új magyar Iliászhoz". Nagyvilág. II (1): 1424–1428.
- Kim, Heon (2023). "Reading Homer's Iliad in North Korea: A Study on Lim Hak-Su's Prefaces to His Three Translated Versions of the Iliad". Korea Journal. 63 (4): 84–110.
- Kornieva, Zoia; Borbenchuk, Iryna; Baklazhenko, Yuliia (2023). "Translation and Teaching of Classical Ancient Greek Literature in Ukraine: Cultural Influence and Historical Dimension". Advanced Education. 23: 4–13.
- Muftić, Edin (2018). "Homer: An Arabic Portrait". Pro Tempore. 13: 21–41.
- Munteanu, Ion (1991). "George Coșbuc 125". Luceafărul (37): 8–9.
- Nellen, Henk; Surdèl, Steven (2012). "'Barbaric and Uneducated'? Modesty Unveiled in the Vernacular Editions by Cornelis van Ghistele and Dirck Coornhert". Sbornik Národního Muzea v Praze. Řada C: Literární Historie. 57 (3): 27–34.
- Pomian, Andrzej (1976). "Koniec Odysei (rzecz o Józefie Wittlinie)". Orzeł Biały. XXXVI (141): 9–10.
- Pormann, Peter E. (2009). "Classics and Islam: From Homer to al-Qāʿida". International Journal of the Classical Tradition. 16 (2): 197–233.
- Rab, Zsuzsa (1972). "Grúz versek fordítása közben". Élet és Irodalom. XVI (25): 6.
- Seppänen, Minna; Paloposki, Outi (2021). "Antiikin tekstien varhaisten suomennosten kontekstipiirteitä". Sananjalka. 63: 214–233.
- Špaňár, Július (1987). "Recenzie. Nad prekladom Iliady a Odysey". Romboid. XXII (2): 84–86.
- Taida, Ichiro (2015). "A Pioneer of Classical studies in Japan, Shigeichi Kure: A Focus on His Translations". Classical Receptions Journal. 7 (2): 260–275.
- Tanașoca, Nicolae Șerban (1973). "Cronica. În amintirea lui George Murnu, mousikòs anér". Viața Românească. XXVI (1–2): 117–120.
- Tritton, A. S. (1964). "Notes. Homer in Arabic". The Journal of Hellenic Studies. 84: 157.
- Vârgolici, Teodor (1980). "Studii. Scriitori români și epopeile clasice". Transilvania. IX (5): 37–39.
- "The Wanderings of a Translation: From Greek to German to Russian". Translation at Michigan. University of Michigan. 30 September 2012.
- Zamfir, Mihai (2016). "Întoarcerea la cărți. Cultura poetului". România Literară (41): 7.
- Zhang, Wei (2021). "Reading Homer in Contemporary China (From the 1980s Until Today)". International Journal of the Classical Tradition. 28 (3): 353–379. doi:10.1007/s12138-020-00558-z. ISSN 1073-0508. JSTOR 48698763.
