= Theophilus of Edessa =

Greco-Syriac astrologer (695–785)

Theophilus of Edessa (Greek: Θεόφιλος, 695–785 AD), also known as Theophilus ibn Tuma and Thawafil, was a medieval astrologer and scholar in Mesopotamia. In the later part of his life he was the court astrologer to the Abbasid caliph al-Mahdi.

Theophilus was a Maronite Christian. He translated numerous books from Greek to Syriac, including the Iliad.

== Life ==
His life is described in the Syriac Chronicle of Bar Hebraeus (1226–1286):

Theophilus served the Caliph al-Mahdî, who esteemed him very much because of his superiority in the art of astrology. It is said that one day the Caliph wanted to take a trip into one of his provinces and to take his court with him. The Caliph's wife sent someone to say to Theophilus: "It is you who have advised the Caliph to take this trip, thereby imposing upon us the fatigue and boredom of the journey, which we don't need. I hope therefore that God will make you perish and disappear from this world, so that, rid of you, we may find some peace." Theophilus replied to the servant who had brought him this message: "Return to your mistress and say to her: "It is not I who have advised the king to take this trip; he travels when it pleases him to do so. As for the curse that you have cast upon me for God to hasten my death, the decision about it has already been taken and affirmed by God; I shall die soon; but do not suppose that I shall have died so that your prayer might be fulfilled; it is the will of my Creator that will accomplish it. But you, O Queen, I say to you: "Prepare a lot of dust for yourself; and when you learn that I am dead, pile all that dust on your head." When the Queen had heard these words, she was seized with a great fear, and she wondered apprehensively what the result would be. A little while afterward, Theophilus died and twenty days after him the Caliph al-Mahdî also died. That which Theophilus had determined came to pass.

== Works ==
Theophilus wrote the following works on astrology in Greek:

- Works on Elections for Wars and Campaigns and Sovereignty
- Astrological Effects
- Various Elections
- Collection on Cosmic Beginnings

These books have been preserved more or less intact, along with fragments of their Arabic versions.

Theophilus also wrote a lost historical chronicle in Syriac. His lost history was used by a number of later writers. The Jacobite patriarch Dionysius of Tel Mahre (818–45) cited it on several occasions in his own world history, the Annals. The tenth-century Melkite historian Agapius of Hierapolis also used material from Theophilus.

Theophilus translated the Iliad and perhaps the Odyssey into Syriac. According to Bar Hebraeus, Theophilus translated "the two books of the poet Homer about the conquest of the city Ilion", which probably includes Odyssey, since only the Odyssey mentions the fall of Troy. Syriac quotations from the Iliad are found in the Rhetoric of Antony of Tagrit of 825 and presumably derive from Theophilus' translation.
