= Livius Andronicus =

Greco-Roman dramatist and epic poet (c. 284 – c. 204 BC)

- Λούκιος Λίβιος Ἀνδρόνικος
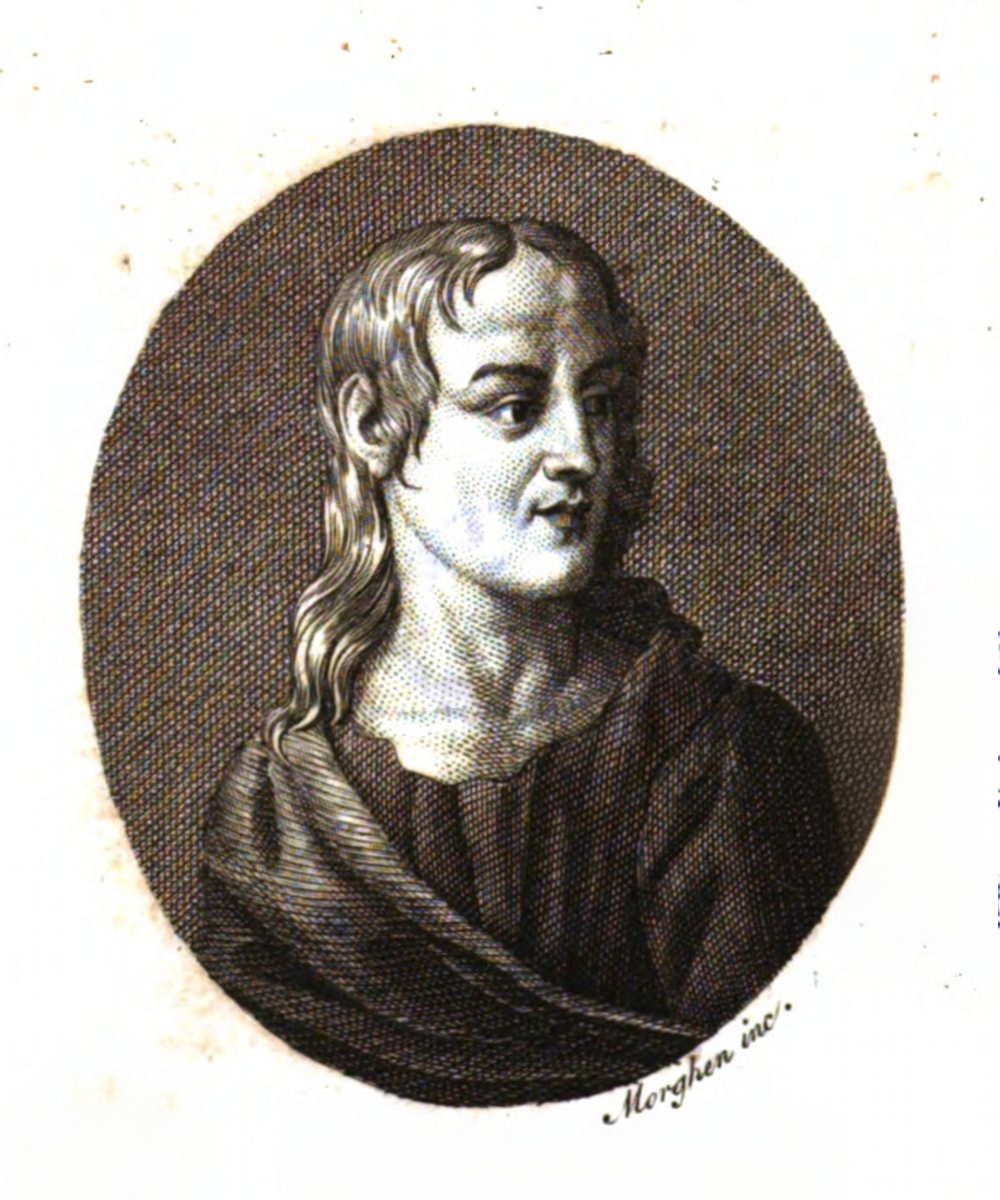
- Born: Lucius Livius Andronicus c. 284 BC; Tarentum
- Died: c. 204 BC (aged around 79); Rome
- Occupations: Writer, playwright, poet
- Writing career
- Language: Latin, Ancient Greek
- Notable work: Odyssia

Lucius Livius Andronicus (/ˈlɪviəs/; Greek: Λούκιος Λίβιος Ἀνδρόνικος; c. 284 – c. 204 BC) was a Greco-Roman dramatist, actor, and epic poet of the Old Latin period during the Roman Republic.

Andronicus began as an educator in the service of a noble family, producing Latin translations of Greek works, including Homer's Odyssey. The translations were meant, at first, as educational devices for the school which he founded. He also wrote works for the stage—both tragedies and comedies—which are regarded as the first dramatic works written in the Latin language. His comedies were based on Greek New Comedy and featured characters in Greek costume. Thus, the Romans referred to this new genre by the term comoedia palliata or fabula palliata, meaning "cloaked comedy," the pallium being a Greek-style cloak. The Roman biographer Suetonius later coined the term "half-Greek" of Livius and Ennius (referring to their genre, not their ethnic backgrounds). The genre was imitated by later generations of playwrights, and Andronicus is accordingly regarded as the father of Roman drama and of Latin literature in general; that is, he was the first man of letters to write in Latin. Varro, Cicero, and Horace, all men of letters during the subsequent Classical Latin period, considered Livius Andronicus to have been the originator of Latin literature. He is the earliest Roman poet whose name is known.

== Biography ==
=== Origins ===
Livius Andronicus was born in Tarentum, Magna Graecia. Not much is known of his childhood, but it is believed he was originally a highly educated Greek, who was bought as a slave by Roman nobles.

=== Name ===
In most ancient sources, he is called "Livius Andronicus" or simply "Livius." Andronicus is the latinisation of the Greek name Andronikos, which was held by a number of Greek historical figures of the period, and so it is generally considered that this was his Greek name and that Livius, a name originally local to Latium, was the gentilicium (family name) of his patron (patronus), someone of the gens Livia. His career at Rome was launched from servitude and he was eventually made a freedman (libertus) by his owner. The praenomen Lucius is given by Aulus Gellius and Cassiodorus.

=== Dates ===
Livius' dates are based mainly on Cicero and Livy. Cicero writes, "This Livius exhibited his first performance at Rome in the consulship of M. Tuditanus and C. Clodius, the son of Caecus, the year before Ennius was born," that is, in 240 BC. Cicero goes on to relate the point of view of Accius, that Livius was captured from Tarentum in 209, and produced a play in 197. Cicero disagrees with this view on the grounds that it makes Livius younger than Plautus and Naevius, even though he was supposed to have been the first to produce a play. Livy writes, "The pontiffs also decreed that three bands of maidens, each consisting of nine, should go through the city singing a hymn. This hymn [the parthenion] was composed by the poet, Livius." This action was taken to appease the gods after a series of evil portents in the consulship of "C. Claudius Nero for the first time, M. Livius for the second," that is, in 207. Only the dates of 240 and 207 seem exempt from controversy.

=== Events ===
Jerome has some additional detail that tends to support the capture at Tarentum and enslavement. His entry for the year of Abraham 1829, the second year of the 148th Olympiad (186/185 BC), of his Chronicon, reads:

Titus Livius tragoediarum scriptor clarus habetur, qui ob ingenii meritum a Livio Salinatore, cuius liberos erudiebat, libertate donatus est.

Titus Livius, author of tragedies, is held to be outstanding. He was given liberty by Livius Salinator, whose children he was educating, by merit of his intelligence.

Jerome is the only author to name him Titus. The passage is ambiguous concerning the events actually happening in Olympiad 148; Andronicus might have been given liberty or simply been honoured, having been liberated long ago. Livius Salinator might be Gaius Livius Salinator, his father Marcus Livius Salinator, or his grandfather Marcus. If Jerome means that the liberation took place in 186, then he seems to be following Accius' view, which might have been presented in the missing portions of Suetonius' de Poetis and read by Jerome. The passage is not conclusive about anything. However, the mixed name of Livius and his being associated with Salinator suggests that he was captured at the first fall of Tarentum in 272, sold to the first Marcus Livius Salinator, tutored the second and was set free to have an independent career when the task was complete.

== Works ==
=== Odyssia ===
Livius made a Latin translation of the Odyssey in Saturnian verse. All that survives is parts of 46 scattered lines from 17 books of the Greek 24-book epic. In some lines, he translates literally, though in others more freely.

=== Plays ===
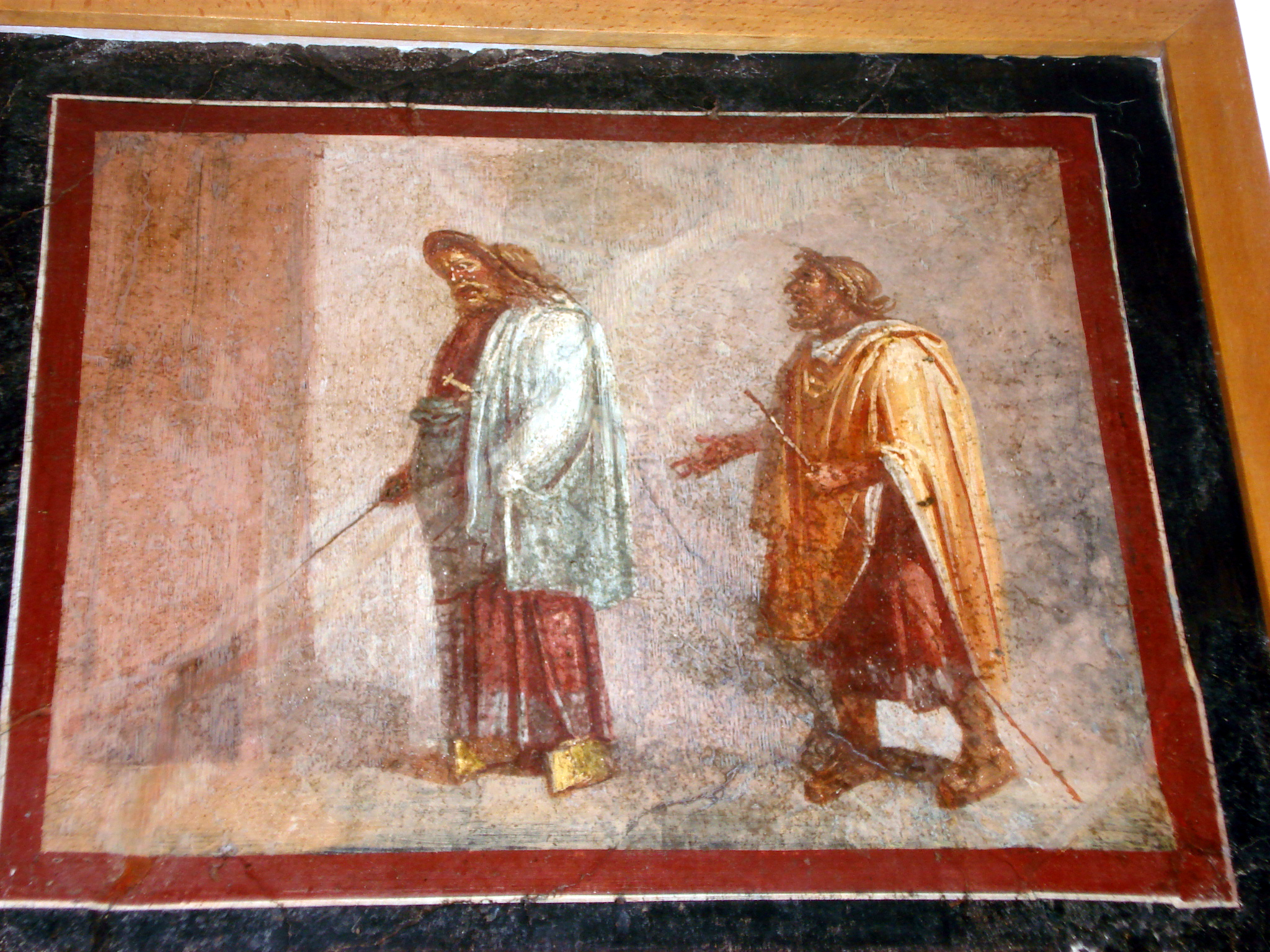
Roman fresco of a theatre scene

Livius' first play, according to Cicero, was staged in 240. Livy states that Livius was the first to create a play with a plot. One story says that after straining his voice, Livius, who was also an actor, was the first to leave the singing to singers and limited the actors to dialogue.

His dramatic works were written in the iambic senarius and trochaic septenarius. They included both lyric passages (cantica) and dialogue (diverbia). His dramatic works had large element of solos for chief actor, often himself. It is not known whether he had a chorus. These dramatic works of Livius Andronicus were consistent with Greek requirements of drama and probably had Greek models, and we have no more than 60 fragments, as quoted in other authors.

His surviving tragedies are as follows:

- Achilles, about which a sole fragment survives, preserved in the works of Nonius Marcellus. Marcellus quotes a passage wherein some character states "If I imitate evil women, then you will pay the price for your wrong." The context of this scene is perhaps that Achilles is speaking to Odysseus, who—on behalf of Agamemnon—is attempting to convince Achilles to rejoin the Greek army. The classicists Robert Maltby and Niall Slater suggest that the quote, though presumably originally from Achilles, was perhaps reported by Odysseus back to Agamemnon in this particular scene.
- Aegisthus, this play may have been influenced by the Oresteia of the 5th-century BCE Athenian tragedian Aeschylus.
- Aiax Mastigophorus (Ajax with the Whip), the two surviving fragments seem to imply that, thematically, the play dealt with the idea of men forgetting the ancient deeds of Ajax at Troy.
- Andromeda, known only from one surviving fragment describing a flood, presumably the one caused by Poseidon in the myth of Andromeda.
- Danae, known from one surviving fragment reading "do you threaten me then? Forget those things which are your responsibility rather than mine." The context of this quote is unclear, though it might have been spoken by king Acrisius in response to the imprecations of Danae. According to Maltby and Slater, if this theory is accepted, then it would imply that—Danae herself and not Acrisius was responsible for her misfortune.
- Equus Troianus (The Trojan Horse), also known from a single fragment. The play presumably recounted the myth of the Trojan Horse.
- Hermiona, known from a single fragment reading "I beg you, Anchialus, be not in any way turned against your mother." The play most likely told the story of Hermiona, though the character of Anchialus is exclusive Andronicus's version of the tale. His name is, however, similar to that of Amphilaus, a character in a play describing the same story authored by Hyginus.
- Tereus

Two titles of his comedies are certain, Gladiolus and Ludius, though the third, Virgo, is probably corrupt. They were all composed on the model of Greek New Comedy, adapting stories from the Greek. The Romans called this sort of adaptation of comedy by Livius and his immediate successors fabulae palliatae, or comoedia palliata, named from the pallium, or short cloak, worn by the actors. Of Andronicus' palliata, there survive 6 fragments of 1 verse each and 1 title, Gladiolus, (Little Sword). It is possible that the play Gladiolus was inspired by any of the Greek comedies entitled Εγχειρίδιον ("Enkheirídion," "the dagger"). The contents of the play are entirely unknown outside of the singular surviving passage, wherein some character states "fleas, or bugs, or lice? Answer me." This line finds a near-exact parallel in Plautus's Curculio, wherein a character states, "In my opinion the race of pimps is among men like flies, gnats, bugs, lice, and fleas." Maltby and Slater suggests that the line from Andronicus was perhaps spoken in reaction to an overconfident soldier bragging about how many people he had slain, with the response implying that the only things he had killed were all insects. As support for this theory, Maltby and Slater cite an excerpt from Plautus's Miles Gloriosus that perhaps utilized the sample template as this putative scene from Andronicus: "I remember one hundred and fifty in Cilicia, one hundred in Scytholatronia, thirty Sardinians, sixty Macedonians, these are the men you killed in a single day."

=== The hymn ===
According to Livy, Livius also composed a hymn for a chorus of 27 girls in honour of Juno to be performed in public as part of religious ceremonies in 207. Because of the success of this hymn, Livius received public honours when his professional organization, the collegium scribarum histrionumque was installed in the Temple of Minerva on the Aventine. Actors and writers would gather here and offer gifts.

== Notes ==
=== Bibliography ===
- Maltby, Robert; Slater, Niall W. (27 December 2022), Fragmentary Republican Latin, Volume VI: Livius Andronicus. Naevius. Caecilius, ISBN 9780674997486
