= Odyssia =

- by Livius Andronicus
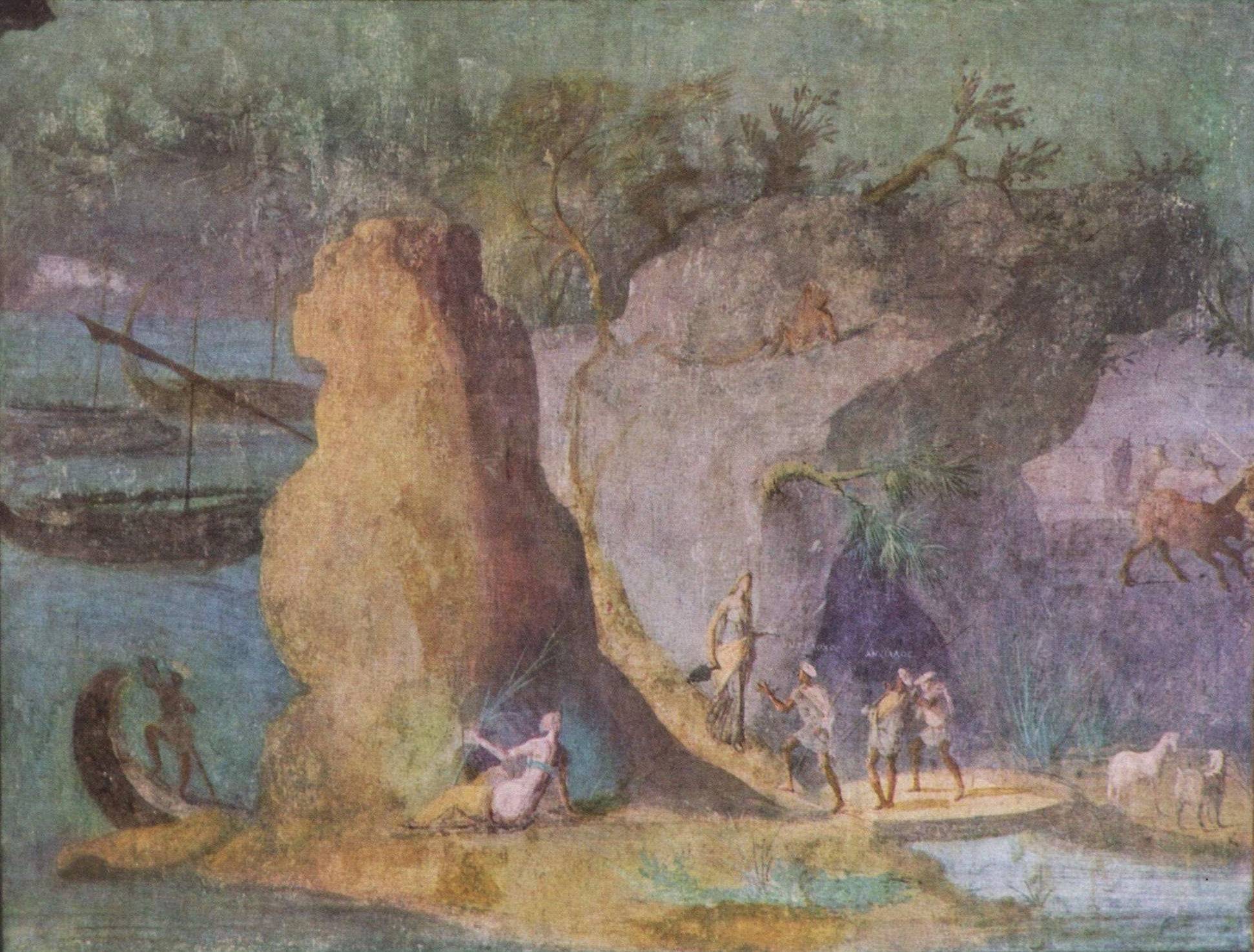
- Roman painting showcasing a scene from the Odyssey
- Original title: Unclear, variously rendered as Ὀδύσσεια (Odússeia), Odyssia, Odyssea, Odissia, and sometimes restored by modern scholars as Odusia
- Language: Old Latin
- Subject: The story of the Odyssey
- Genre: Epic
- Form: Epic poem
- Meter: Saturnian meter
- Publication date: 3rd century BCE

The Odyssia, alternatively titled—in ancient manuscripts—as the Odissia or Odyssea, and sometimes restored by modern sources as the Odusia, was an ancient translation of the Odyssey by the 3rd-century BCE Latin author Livius Andronicus. The work is considered to be the first work of epic Latin literature, and it seems to have established the Saturnian meter—in which it was composed—as the standard format of Roman epic for a brief period. It seems to have been utilized as a text for teaching Roman children until at least the time of the 1st-century BCE poet Horace, though—by the life of the 1st-century rhetorician Quintilian—it may have been replaced by the works of Virgil.

== Name ==
The name of the original text is unclear; in the works of the 2nd-century author Aulus Gellius, the title is rendered in Greek as Ὀδύσσεια ("Odússeia"), in which case Gellius may have seen a direct Latin transliteration of this Greek name, which would be ODVSSEIA. Amongst other authors, various different spellings of the title have been found—those being, in decreasing order of frequency, Odyssia, Odissia, and Odyssea. Some scholars have tried to restore the title as Odusia, on the basis that the usage of y to represent Greek υ ("u") and the usage of double consonants were not present in Latin orthography during Andronicus's time. However, the classicists Robert Maltby and Niall Slater argue that Livius may have wished to remain as close to the original Greek title as possible, as was the case with his tragedies.

== Contents and style ==
=== Romanization of Homer ===
Based on the surviving fragments, it is clear that Livius had a desire to retain the grandiose and dignified style of the Odyssey, and he thus utilized intentionally archaicizing language, such as first declension genitive singular forms in -as. In some places, Livius's artistic ambitions motivated a departure from the original content of the text. Livius abandoned the hexameter of the original Greek poem, instead authoring his translation in the aforementioned Saturnian verse. During Livius's lifetime, the Saturnian meter was found throughout Rome on numerous important documents, including those recording military triumphs. It was, according to the classicist Siobhán McElduff, the "meter of Roman power and conquest," and it therefore would have imparted a strong sense of solemnity onto Livius's contemporary audience. Saturnian meter was also considered by ancient authors to be a native Roman art form, and therefore McElduff argues that its usage would have enhanced the Roman-ness of the work by removing foreign elements.

Throughout the rest of the text, Livius tried to adapt lines and passages to fit Roman attitudes and culture. He inserts into the text Roman items that would have been unfamiliar to the original Greek audience of Homer. For instance, he describes the character Nausicaa riding a carpentum, a type of two-wheeled carriage used by Roman elite, whereas Homer writes of a four-wheeled cart. According to Maltby and Slater, this particular change likely served to portray Nausicaa with a kind of "Roman epic dignity." Livius inserted Roman names into the story rather than Greek ones, rendering Odysseus as Ulixes, Cronos as Saturnus, Musa as Camena, Moira as Morta, and Mnemosyne as Moneta. In the very first line, he writes "tell me, Camena, of the clever man," thereby invoking not a Greek Muse, but a native Italic divinity—one who was connected explicitly to the city of Rome, for Egeria—a Camena—was associated with a spring by the Porta Capena. In another fragment, one character refers to the homeland of Odysseus as Graecia ("Graeciam"), utilizing the Latin name instead of the archaic Greek endonym. For whatever reason, Livius opted to remove certain original Greek epithets, such as the descriptor "fair-faced" ("εὐώπιδα," "euṓpida") for Nausicaa and the attribute "who works from afar" ("Ἑκάεργος," "Hekáergos") for Apollo. It is possible that this change was motivated by the shorter length of the Saturnian meter when compared to the hexameter of Homer.

Livius also felt the need to alter untranslatable phrases and ideas. For instance, the phrase "equal to the gods", which would have been unacceptable to Romans, was changed to "summus adprimus," meaning "greatest and of first rank." Certain metaphors and idioms exclusive to the Greek language were adjusted in his translation, such as the phrase "the barrier of your teeth" ("τέκνον ἐμόν, ποῖόν σε ἔπος φύγεν ἔρκος ὀδόντων," "téknon emón, poîón se épos phúgen érkos odóntōn") in Od. 1.64, which is simply translated as "mouth" ("ore"). Similarly, Livius translates the Greek phrase "then Odysseus’ knees grew loose, and the heart within him melted" ("καὶ τότ᾿ Ὀδυσσῆος λύτο γούνατα καὶ φίλον ἦτορ," "kaì tót᾿ Odussêos lúto goúnata kaì phílon êtor") in Od. 5.297 as "the heart of Ulysses went cold with fear" ("igitur demum Ulixi cor frixit prae pavore"). This passage does, however, still seem to preserve some sense of Homericism, for it parallels another line Odyssey reading "For always the heart in my breast was full of fear" ("αἰεὶ γάρ μοι θυμὸς ἐνὶ στήθεσσι φίλοισιν," "aieì gár moi thumòs enì stḗthessi phíloisin").

=== Reinterpretation of Homer ===
Livius appears to have, in certain circumstances, reinterpreted Homer—adjusting lines to fit his own artistic vision, rather than that of the original. In particular, according to the classicist Gian Biagio Conte, Livius sometimes sought to add more "pathos, expressive force, and dramatic tension." As an example, Conte cites the line "I have not forgotten you, son of Laertes," which may have served to translate the original sequence "grief for Odysseus, who is no more, takes hold of me." The original line was spoken by the swineherd Eumaeus to a disguised Odysseus, and it emphasizes the sorrow Eumaeus feels at the disappearance of Odysseus. Andronicus rewrites the line in the second person, as if—according to Conte—his "grief leads him to apostrophize as if present a person who is far away but who, as the readers know, is present to hear him."

Maltby and Slater note two additional passages wherein Andronicus seems to have removed more colloquial dialogue from Homer, substituting it with more epic language. For example, in one fragment Andronicus rewrites the line "come now tell me" in Od. 1.169 with the more direct statement "and you must tell me" ("tuque mihi narrato"). Andronicus also utilizes more direct language when translating the sequence wherein Laodamas describes the perils of the sea, which in Homer is begun with the phrase "for I say there is nothing worse" ("οὐ γὰρ ἐγώ γέ τί φημι κακώτερον ἄλλο"), while Andronicus instead writes "for there is nothing that wastes a man worse" ("namque nullum peius macerat humanum"). Unlike the Greek, Livius clarifies that the destruction will be "swift" ("topper") and he provides special emphasis on the cruelty of the ocean, describing the "dangerous waves" ("inportunae undae") and the "savage sea" ("mare saevum"), whereas the original Greek text merely mentions "the sea" ("θαλάσσης," "thalássēs").

In one instance, Livius may have combined two separate passages from Homer into one: He writes "part of them wander, they are unable to return to Greece" ("partim errant, nequinont Graeciam redire"), which may have merged the lines "for many of them were slain and many were left behind" and "he cannot come to his native land" from the Odyssey. It is possible that Livius also combined a snippet of the Odyssey with a line from the Iliad. This Andronican passage, reading "the holy child of Saturn, his royal daughter" ("sancta puer Saturni filia regina"), may represent the moment in the Odyssey wherein Proteus tells Menelaus how "queenly Hera" ("πότνια Ἥρη," "pótnia Hḗrē") saved Agamemnon. However, the act of addressing Hera—or, in this case, Juno—as the daughter of Saturn, appears to have been borrowed from the Iliad, as Hera is never addressed as the daughter of Cronos in the Odyssey.

=== Possible reliance on scholia and variant manuscripts ===
Certain apparent differences between the original Odyssey and the translation were perhaps caused by manuscript variations. For example, Andronicus appears to have translated Od. 10.395 as "quickly she brought it about that they became men again" ("topper facit homines ut rusus fuerint"), whereas the original Greek reads "and they became men again, younger than they were before" ("ἄνδρες δ’ αἶψ’ ἐγένοντο νεώτεροι ἢ πάρος ἦσαν," "ándres d’ aîps’ egénonto neṓteroi ḕ páros êsan"). Androicus appears to have seen αἶψ’ ("aîps’," "quickly") in his copy of the Odyssey, whereas the text was later emended to ἄψ ("again") by the critic Aristarchus of the Samothrace after Andronicus's time. Though, it is possible that this edit to the text was known to Andronicus via prior commentators on the Odyssey, and Andronicus perhaps sought to accommodate this alternative reading through the usage of the term "rusus" ("again").

Likewise, one fragment mentions the "house of Circe" ("aedis ... Circe"), which appears to translate the phrase "beautifully built palace" ("τετυγμένα δώματα καλά," "tetugména dṓmata kalá") in the original Greek. Yet, the indirect tradition for the Odyssey suggests a variant reading "house of Circe" ("δώματα Κίρκης," "dṓmata Kírkēs"), which—according to Maltby and Slater—is probably the version that was available to Andronicus. In another fragment, Livius writes "they entwined each other in many a confusing twist of knots" ("nexebant multa inter se flexu nodorum dubio"), which differs significantly from the Greek original that reads "the two began to dance on the bounteous earth, tossing the ball between them" ("ὀρχείσθην δὴ ἐπειτα ποτὶ χθονὶ πουλυβοτείρῃ ταρφέ’ ἀμειβομένω," "orkheísthēn dḕ epeita potì khthonì pouluboteírēi tarphé’ ameiboménō"), though it is perhaps based on Homeric scholia, one of which seeks to explain the Greek text with comment "frequently entwining with each other in their exchanges" ("πυκνῶς πλέκοντες εἰς ἀλλήλους ἐναλλασσόμενοι," "puknôs plékontes eis allḗlous enallassómenoi"). However, Maltby and Slater argue that the lexical similarities between these two passages are not strong enough to conclusively justify the belief that Livius relied on the scholia.

== Influence and reception ==
Livius's translation of the Odyssey is of great historical importance; it made this fundamental Greek text accessible to the Roman elite and it established the tradition of epic literature in Latin. Following the Odyssia, the Saturnian meter emerged the standard format of Latin epics for the ensuing years, with works such as the Bellum Poenicum of Naevius following in its footsteps. However, after the Annales of Ennius, hexameter became the normal meter of Roman epic. This project was one of the first examples of translation as an artistic process; the work, at least originally, was to be enjoyed on its own. By the time of the 1st-century BCE author Horace, it appears to have been utilized as a school-text for educating Roman children, as Horace mentions that verses of Livius Andronicus, alongside the Greek text of the Odyssey, were taught to him as a child. According to McElduff, the text would have provided Roman children the ability to engage with the Greek classic, but in a way that was more appropriately Roman. Nevertheless, at a later period, the 1st-century CE rhetorician Quintilian recommended that students read Homer and Virgil, implying that—by this point in time—Virgil had assumed the place of Livius in Roman education.

Cicero compares Andronicus's translation to a statue produced by Daedalus, who was considered—in Greek mythology—to have been the first artist and to have produced lifelike sculptures. Thus, according to the classicist Antje Wessels, by comparing this work of Andronicus to the creations of Daedalus, Cicero was associated the former with the first artwork and a "one-to-one-copy of a living original in stone." Alternatively, according to Maltby and Slater, Cicero instead meant to denigrated Andronicus's work as "archaic and primitive," which jives well with Cicero's statement that Andronicus's plays were "not worth a second reading." Horace also appears to have held a negative opinion about the works of Livius Andronicus, stating that it "amazes" him that other consider the Livius's verses to be "finished and beautiful."

=== Pseudo-Andronicus ===
Priscian, a 6th-century Latin grammarian, attributes a series of five fragments to Livius Andronicus's Odyssia. However, these additional fragments are composed in hexameter, not Saturnian verse, and therefore must have been created after the time of Ennius, who introduced hexameter to Latin literature. Moreover, Priscian cites two different passages from different books—books 1 and 6 respectively—and the twenty-four book structure of the Odyssey was not developed until after Livius's time. Thus, this hexameter version of the work has been interpreted as a post-Ennian reworking of the original by Livius. Festus, a 2nd-century Roman grammarian, and also Charisius, a 4th-century grammarian, refer specifically to the original Saturnian text as the "old Odyssia" ("Odyssia vetere"), perhaps in an effort to distinguish the version by Livius from this later remodeling.
