= Moshe Ha-Elion =

Greek concentration camps survivor (1925–2022)

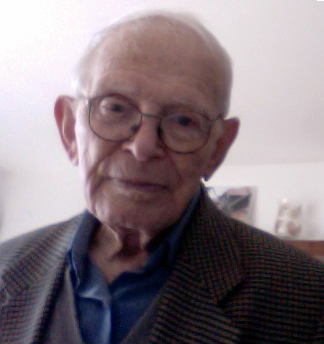
Moshe Ha-Elion at his home in Bat Yam, Israel. January 2016.

Moshe Ha-Elion (Hebrew: משה העליון; 26 February 1925 – 1 November 2022), also written Moshe Haelion, Moshe 'Ha-Elion, Moshé Ha-Elion, Moshé 'Ha-Elion, Moshé Haelyon, was a Holocaust survivor and writer. He survived Auschwitz, the death march, Mauthausen, Melk, and Ebensee. He is the author of a memoir, מיצרי שאול (Meizarey Sheol), originally written in Hebrew and translated into English as The Straits of Hell: The chronicle of a Salonikan Jew in the Nazi extermination camps Auschwitz, Mauthausen, Melk, Ebensee. He wrote three poems in Ladino based on his experiences in the concentration camps and the death march: "La djovenika al lager", "Komo komian el pan", and "En marcha de la muerte", published in Ladino and Hebrew under the title En los Kampos de la Muerte. Moshe Ha-Elion translated Homer's Odyssey into Ladino. He lived in Israel. He had two children, six grandchildren, and nine great-grandchildren.

== Biography: before deportation ==
Moshe Ha-Elion was born in Thessaloniki, Greece, on 26 February 1925. He came from a middle-class Sephardic Jewish family. Moshe's grandfather was a rabbi. Moshe's father, Eliau, worked as a bookkeeper in a shop. His mother, Rachel, was a housewife. His sister (a year and a half younger than him) was Ester (Nina). The family spoke Ladino at home. Outside the house, they spoke Greek. Moshe also learned Hebrew. Moshe studied at the Primary School "Talmud Torá" of the Jewish Community of Thessaloniki. The principal of the school was Moshe's uncle (Moshe's father's brother). Afterwards, he continued his studies at a public Greek gymnasium in Thessaloniki.

In 1936 there were some anti-Semitic attacks in Thessaloniki. Moshe was then 11 years old. Although his family was Zionist, they never thought of leaving Thessaloniki. When the Germans invaded Thessaloniki (9 April 1941), everything changed: "When the Germans entered, we [felt] a big fear ... because we knew from the newspapers what happened in Germany: the Kristallnacht, the persecutions." Moshe's father died on 15 April 1941, six days after the Germans invaded Thessaloniki.

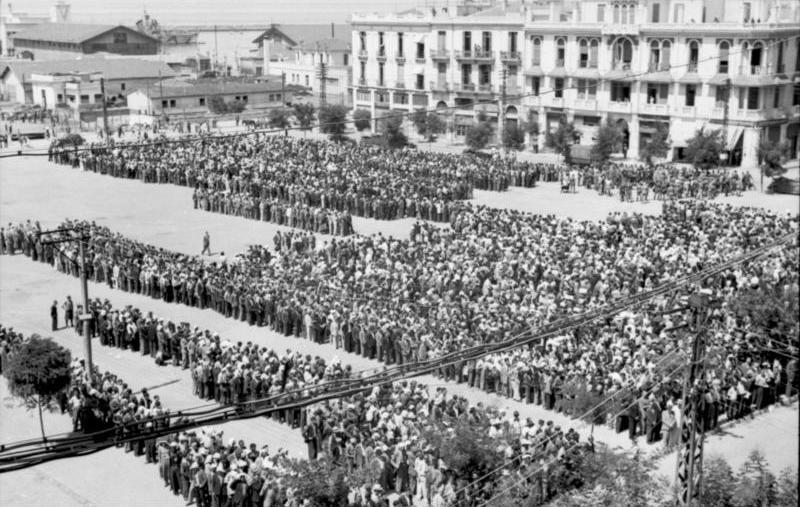
Registration of the Jews of Thessaloniki, July 1942, Eleftherias Square. Bundesarchiv Bild 101I-168-0894-21A

In the summer of 1942, the persecution of the Jews of Thessaloniki started. On 11 July 1942, all Jewish men between the ages of 18 and 45 were ordered to concentrate in the Independence Square of Thessaloniki for "registration". In the square, the Jews suffered their first humiliations: the Germans forced them to do gymnastics in the hot weather and did not allow them to drink water. Moshe and the rest of the Jewish community of Thessaloniki were informed by German Nazi officials that they would all be relocated to Poland. Then, Jews were ordered to wear the Yellow Star of David and forced into two ghettos, one in the east of Thessaloniki and one in the western, called Baron Hirsch, adjacent to the rail lines.

On 15 March 1943, the Germans began deporting Jews from Thessaloniki. Every three days, freight cars crammed with an average of 2,000 Thessaloniki Jews headed toward Auschwitz-Birkenau. By the summer of 1943, the Germans had deported 46,091 Jews. Most of the deportees were gassed on arrival in Auschwitz-Birkenau.

== Auschwitz ==
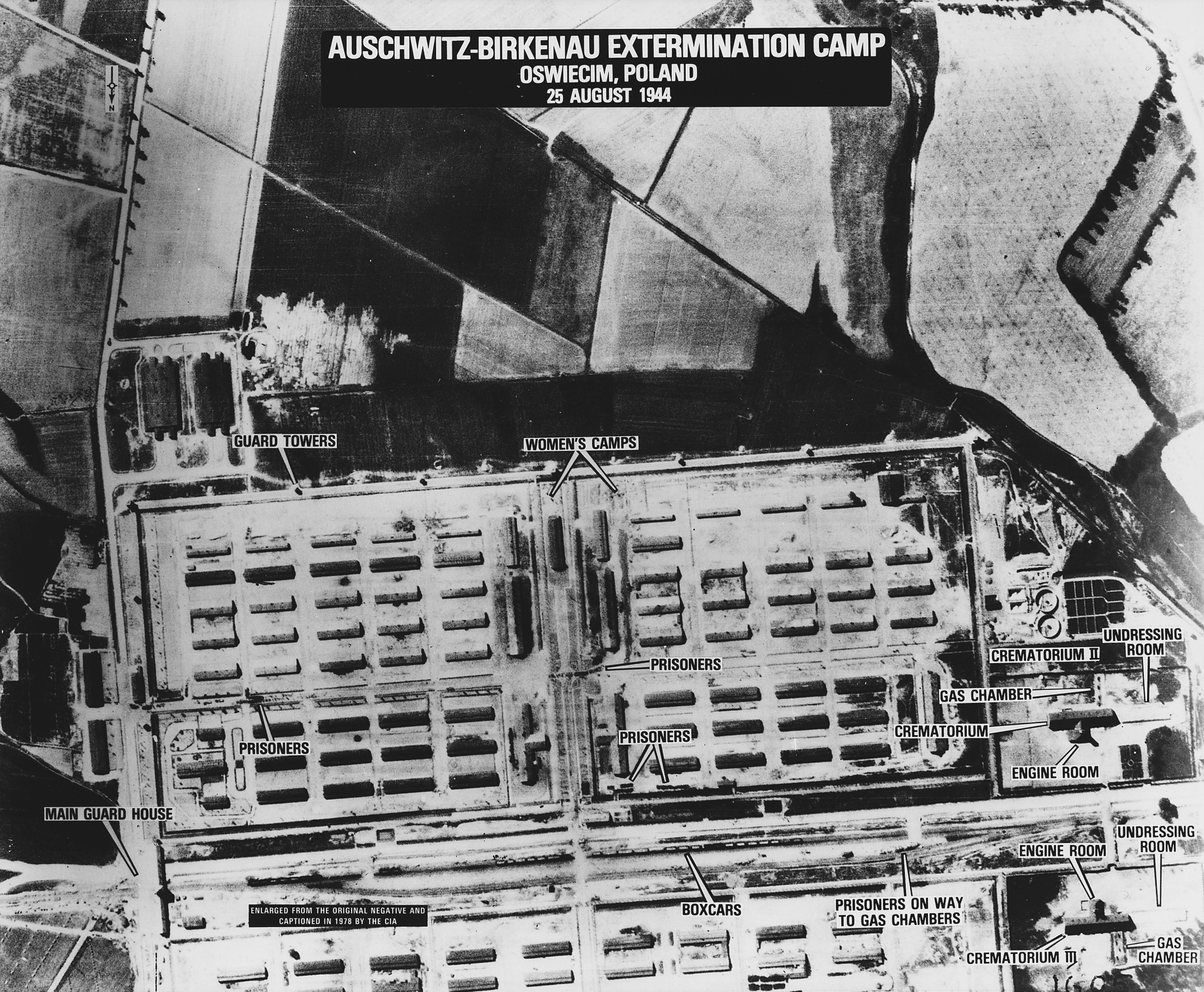
Photo of the Nazi extermination camp at Auschwitz-Birkenau, taken by a United States Army Air Force plane, 25 August 1944

The first transport of Jews from Thessaloniki to Poland left on 15 March 1943. All transports left from the Baron Hirsch ghetto.

On 4 April 1943, Moshe and his family (his mother and sister, both of Moshe's maternal grandparents, his uncle with his wife and their one year old child) were ordered to the Baron Hirsch ghetto believing that from there they will be transported and resettled in Poland. They packed their bags which included warm clothing they bought especially for settling in Poland, left their keys with their non-Jewish neighbors and moved to the Baron Hirsch ghetto.

In the morning of 7 April 1943 Moshe and his family were transported in freight wagons packed with people. They travelled for six days and nights. He describes the deportation in his poem "La djovenika al lager". On the night of 13 April they arrived to Auschwitz.

Moshe's mother and sister were gassed upon arrival. Moshe's maternal grandparents, his uncle's wife and his one-year-old son were also gassed upon arrival. Moshe's uncle was murdered in Auschwitz some months later.

By August 1943, 46,091 Greek Jews were deported to Auschwitz-Birkenau. Of those, 1,950 survived. Fewer than 5,000 of the 80,000 Jews living in Greece survived. The majority, after being rescued from the camps, emigrated to Israel.

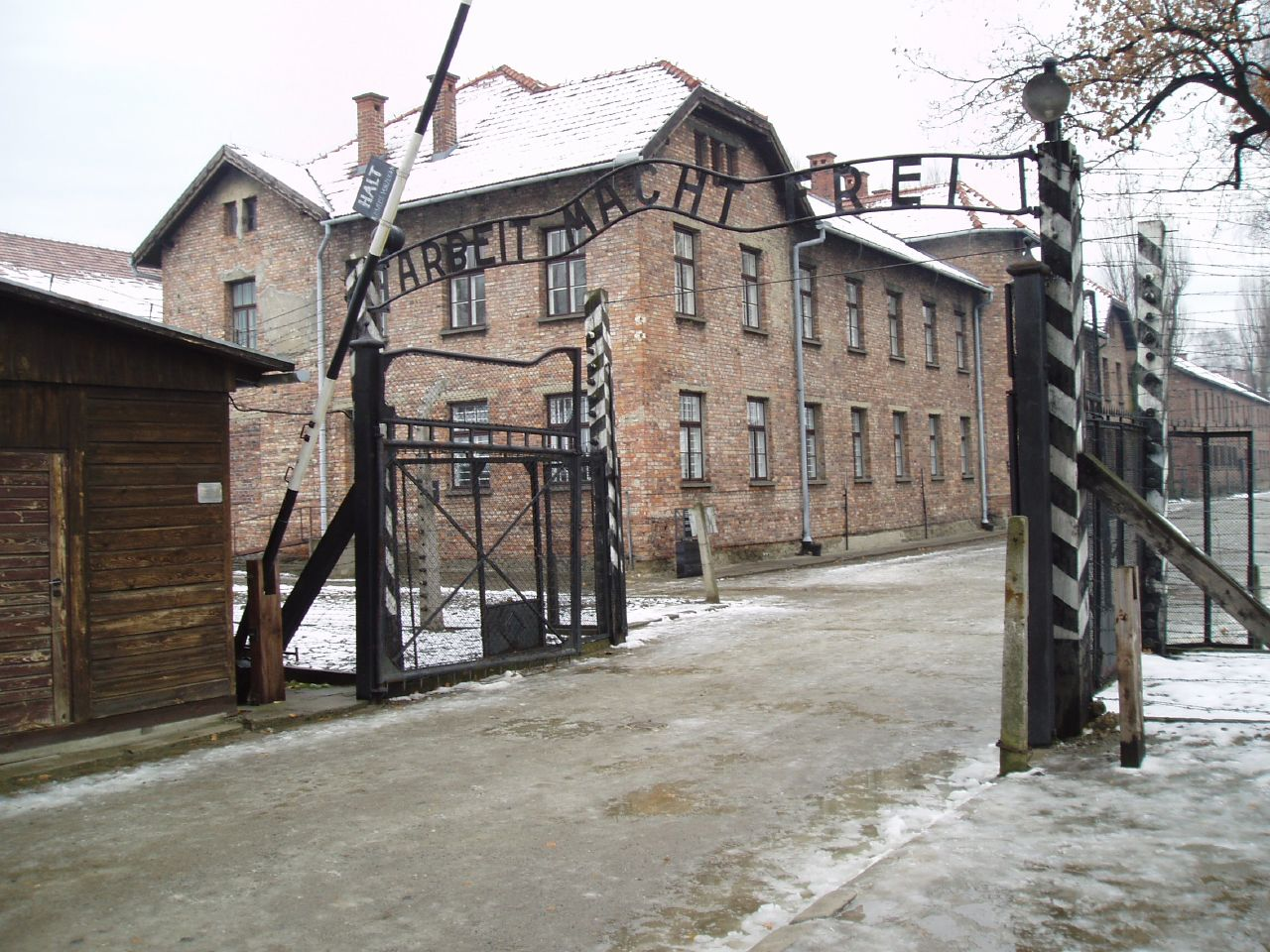
"Arbeit macht frei" sign, main gate of the Auschwitz I concentration camp, Poland, 2005

Moshe Ha-Elion was tattooed in Auschwitz with the number 114923 on his left arm. He worked in forced labour in Auschwitz I for 21 months, until 1945. "Auschwitz was hell (...) It was a place where you never knew if you were going to be alive the next minute. A place where children could not live... they were condemned to die, as well as their mothers. Only the ones that could work could live for some time. The rest, to death".

== Death march ==
On 21 January 1945, Moshe was forced, together with thousands of prisoners, to march. He describes the death march in his poem "En marcha de la muerte". Every now and then, Moshe could hear the guns killing the victims who could no longer walk. On the second day they arrived at a train station. The prisoners were put inside freight wagons without water or food. After three days, they arrived at Mauthausen.

== Mauthausen, Melk and Ebensee ==
Moshe was forced to work at Mauthausen concentration camp and then he was transferred to Melk, where he worked as a forced labourer in a munitions factory, inside the mountains, in tunnels. When the Allies were approaching the camps, the Germans took the prisoners through the Danube in small boats to the city of Linz and then, after four days by foot, to Ebensee.

Mauthausen, Melk and Ebensee were located in Austria which was a part of Nazi Germany. The hunger was atrocious. Moshe had to eat carbon to survive. In his poem "Komo komian el pan", Moshe writes that during his years as a prisoner in the Nazi concentration camps his stomach was always crying.

== Liberation ==
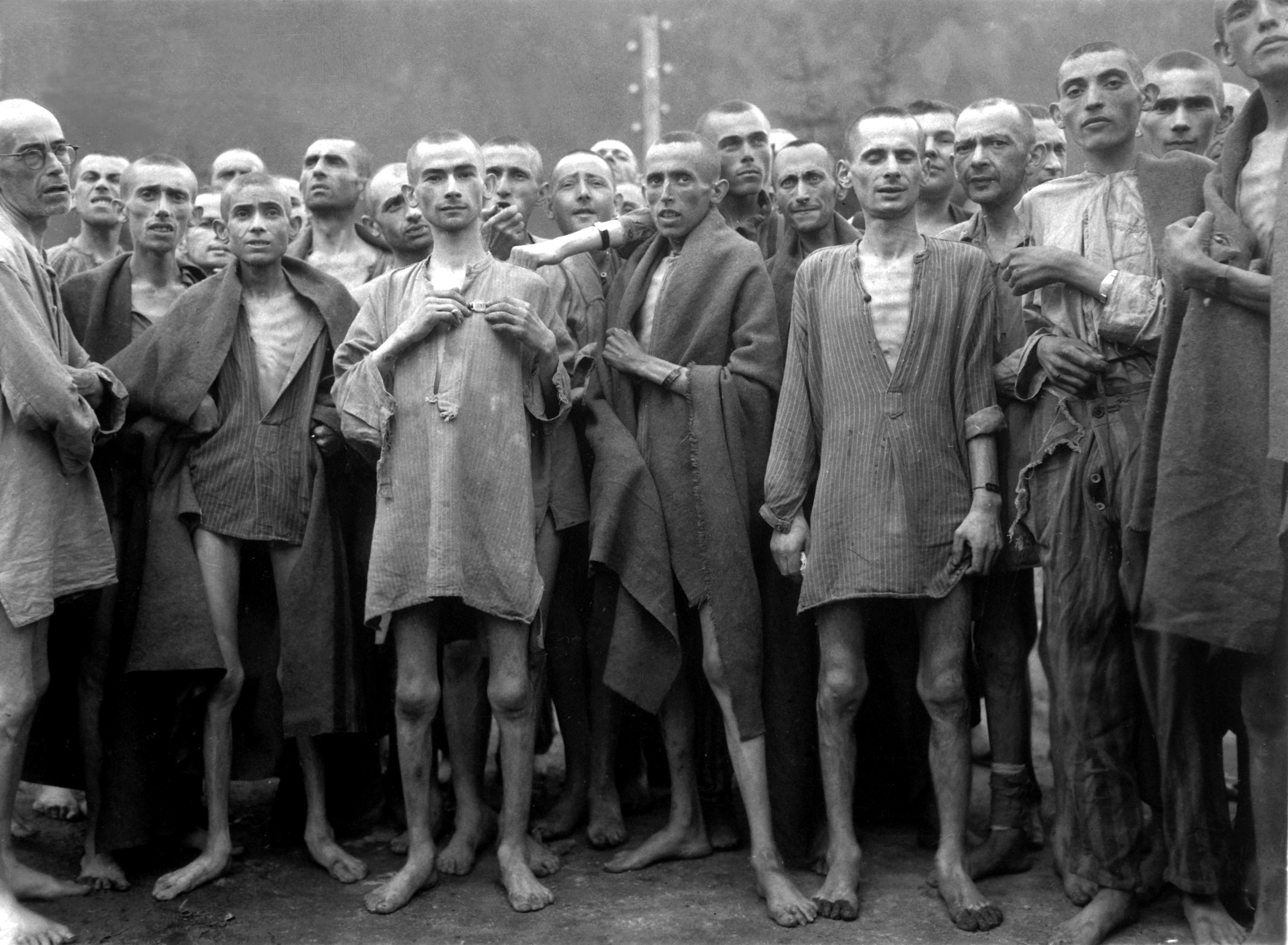
Survivors of the Ebensee concentration camp, after the liberation, 1945

On 6 May 1945, one week after Hitler's death, the American army liberated all the sub-camps of Mauthausen, including Ebensee, where Moshe Ha-Elion was a prisoner. Three American tanks entered Ebensee. Some prisoners were touching them to be sure that they were real. Some inmates were crying, some were shouting. Moshe Ha-Elion recalls that the Polish inmates were singing the Polish hymn, the Greek inmates were singing the Greek hymn and the French inmates were singing La Marseillaise. After, the Jewish inmates were singing Ha Tikvah.

== After the war ==
After the liberation, Moshe Ha-Elion decided not to come back to Thessaloniki, and illegally emigrated to Palestine on board the Wedgewood boat in June 1946, after being in the south of Italy for one year. The boat was taken by the British army. Moshe was imprisoned for one month in a British camp in Atlit (located in British Mandatory Palestine).

== Work, studies and Remembering the Shoah Organizations after the war ==
Moshe Ha-Elion fought in the 1948 Arab-Israeli War. In 1950 he became an officer in the artillery division of the IDF. In 1970 he retired from his military career as a lieutenant colonel and finally in 1976, while serving in the reserved forces, he was named colonel. Moshe worked in the Israeli Ministry of Defense and was first an assistant and then head of an operational unit. He then worked for the administration until he retired.

Moshe got his Bachelor of Arts (B.A.) and master's degree (M.A.) in Humanitas from the University of Tel-Aviv.

Moshe Ha-Elion was the president of the "Asosiasión de los Reskapados de los Kampos de Eksterminasión, Orijinarios de Grecha en Israel" (Association of the Holocaust Survivors from Greece in Israel) from 2001 until 2015. Before that, and for 25 years, he was a member of the Association and vice president. After 2015 he received the title of Honorary President of the Association.

Moshe Ha-Elion was a member of the board of Yad Vashem for more than 10 years. He was also a member of the board of the Lión Recanati CASA and Honorary President of the "Chentro de Erensia de las komunidades de Saloniki i de Grecha" (Center of Heritage of the Saloniki and Greece Communities).

== Coming back to Auschwitz ==
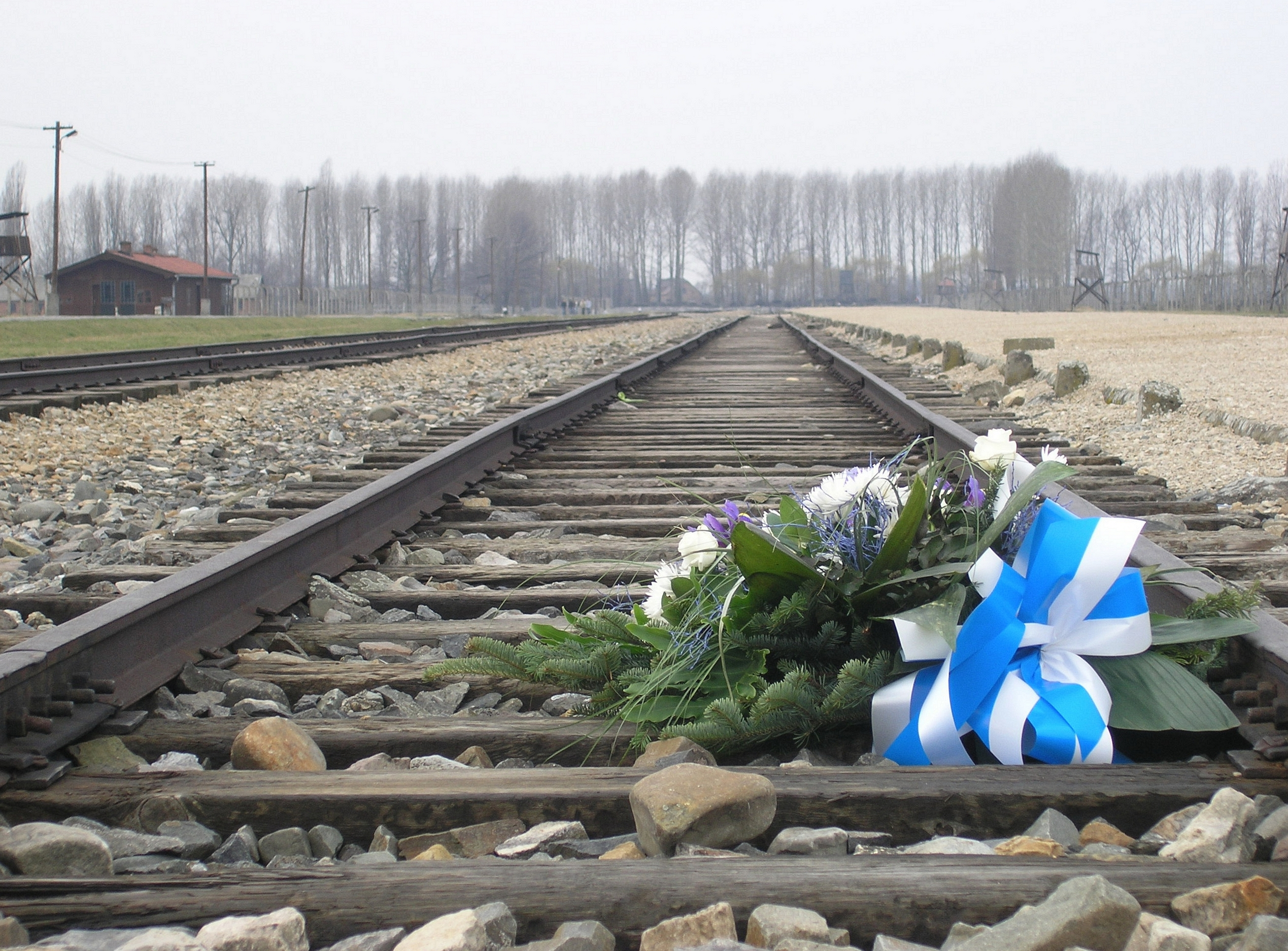
Flowers on the rails of Auschwitz-Birkenau

Moshe Ha-Elion returned to Auschwitz several times in order to commemorate the victims of the Holocaust. In March 1987 he visited the Auschwitz-Birkenau State Museum together with his daughter, a group of other survivors and a radio crew of the Israeli radio station "Galei Zahal".

Ha-Elion said that he has been in Auschwitz 15 times, but, he remarked ironically, the first one was against his will.

The message of Moshe Ha-Elion was: "The world must not forget (...) The Jewish people we are always going to remember, but the whole world has to know what happened".

In 2015, Moshe said: "Two years ago I was in Auschwitz, with my daughter and my granddaughter, and my granddaughter was pregnant. We were there, four generations, at the place where they tried to kill me. That's my victory".

== Personal life and death ==
Moshe's father died on 15 April 1941, just a few days after the Nazis invaded Thessaloniki (9 April 1941). Moshe's mother and sister were gassed in Auschwitz upon arrival (13 April 1943). On 2 February 1947, Moshe married Haná Waldman in Palestine, whom he had met in Italy. They had a daughter called Rahel and a son called Elí. Moshe had six grandchildren and five great-grandchildren. Haná Waldman died on 1 September 2010. Ha-Elion died on 1 November 2022, at the age of 97.

== Works and compositions ==
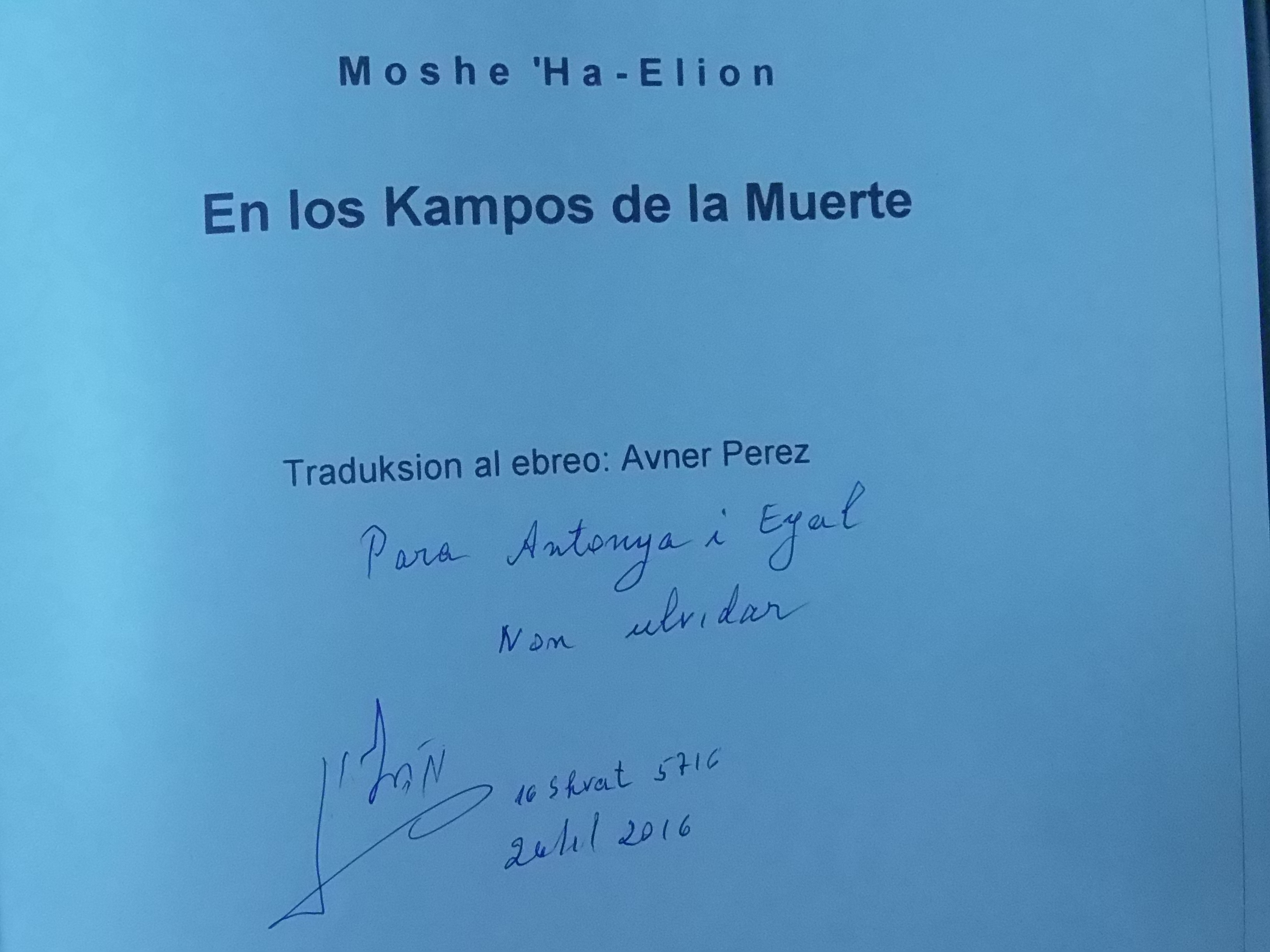
En los Kampos de la Muerte written and signed by Moshe Ha-Elion

In 1992 Moshe Ha-Elion published an autobiography called מיצרי שאול (Meizarey Sheol) written in Hebrew and translated into English in 2005 with the title The Straits of Hell. The chronicle of a Salonikan Jew in the Nazi extermination camps Auschwitz, Mauthausen, Melk, Ebensee.

In 2000 Moshe Ha-Elion published En los Kampos de la Muerte, a poetic and autobiographical text written in Ladino and formed of three very large poems: "La djovenika al lager" (dedicated to his sister); "Komo komian el pan"; and "En marcha de la muerte" (poem that describes his death march).

Moshe Ha-Elion also composed music for the first poem of En los Kampos de la Muerte: "La djovenika al lager".

En los Kampos de la Muerte has been adapted to a theater-music-poetic show by the baroque ensemble Rubato Appassionato and actor Gary Shochat.

== Bibliography and Editions ==
- מיצרי שאול. Written and published in Hebrew. Magav Mada Vetechnologia Ltd. Tel-Aviv, 1992.
- En los Kampos de la Muerte. Originally written in Ladino. Hebrew translation by Avner Perez. Bilingual edition in Ladino & Hebrew. Published by Instituto Maale Adumim, Maale Adumim, Israel, 2000.
- The Straits of Hell. The chronicle of a Salonikan Jew in the Nazi extermination camps Auschwitz, Mauthausen, Melk, Ebensee. (English translation of מיצרי שאול). Mannheim: Bibliopolis and Cincinnati: BCAP, 2005. Steven B. Bowman, editor.
- Las Angustias del Enferno: Las pasadias de un Djidio de Saloniki en los kampos de eksterminasion almanes Auschwitz, Mauthausen, Melk i Ebensee (Ladino translation of מיצרי שאול). Language: Ladino. Published by Sentro Moshe David Gaon de Kultura Djudeo-Espanyola / Universidad Ben-Gurion del Negev, 2007
- The Straits of Hell: The Chronicle of a Salonikan Jew in the Nazi Extermination Camps Auschwitz, Mauthausen, Melk, Ebensee (Peleus). (English translation of מיצרי שאול). Published by Otto Harrassowitz, 2009. ISBN 9783447059763
- Shay Le-Navon - La Odisea Trezladada en Ladino i Ebreo del Grego Antiguo: Prezentada kon Estima i Afeksion a Yitshak Navon, Sinken Prezidente de Israel i Prezidente de la Autoridad Nasionala del Ladino al Kumplir Noventa Anios [TWO VOLUME SET]. Homer / Ha-Elion, Moshe; Perez, Avner [Trans.] Published by Yeriot, 2011 and 2014
