= Antony of Tagrit =

9th-century Syrian theologian & rhetor

Anthony of Tagrit (Classical Syriac: ܐܢܛܘܢܝܘܣ ܕܬܓܪܝܬ, also known as Antonius Rhetor) was a 9th-century West Syrian Syriac theologian and rhetor. Anthony was based in Tagrit and is best remembered for his contribution to Syriac literature. One of his few surviving works The Book of the Rhetoric (ܥܠ ܝܕܥܬܐ ܕܪܗܝܛܪܘܬܐ) was translated to several languages including English.
