= Walter Burkert =

German classical philologist and religious scholar (1931–2015)

- Born: 2 February 1931; Neuendettelsau, Germany
- Died: 11 March 2015 (aged 84); Zürich, Switzerland
- Awards: Balzan Prize (1990); Sigmund Freud Prize (2003); Order of Merit of the Federal Republic of Germany (2008)

Academic background
- Education: University of Erlangen; Ludwig-Maximilians-Universität München

Academic work
- Discipline: Classics
- Sub-discipline: Ancient Greek Religion
- Institutions: Technische Universität Berlin; University of Zurich
- Notable works: Homo Necans (1972)

Walter Burkert (German: [ˈbʊɐ̯kɐt]; 2 February 1931 – 11 March 2015) was a German scholar of Greek mythology and cult.

A professor of classics at the University of Zurich, Switzerland, he taught in the United Kingdom and the United States. He has influenced generations of students of religion since the 1960s, combining in the modern way the findings of archaeology and epigraphy with the work of poets, historians, and philosophers. He was a member of both the American Philosophical Society and the American Academy of Arts and Sciences.

He published books on the balance between lore and science among the followers of Pythagoras, and more extensively on ritual and archaic cult survival, on the ritual killing at the heart of religion, on mystery religions, and on the reception in the Hellenic world of Near Eastern and Persian culture, which sets Greek religion in its wider Aegean and Near Eastern context.

== Life ==
Burkert was born in Neuendettelsau. He married Maria Bosch in 1957, and they had three children, Reinhard, Andrea and Cornelius.

He studied classical philology, history, and philosophy at the University of Erlangen and the Ludwig-Maximilians-Universität München (1950–1954), and obtained his doctorate in philosophy at Erlangen in 1955. Following his marriage, he became an assistant in course teaching at the University of Erlangen for five years (1957–1961) and, then returned to his former university as lecturer for another five years (until 1966). From early 1965 he worked as a junior fellow in the Center for Hellenic Studies in Washington, D.C. for one year. The first academic era of his life ended with a placement as professor of classical philology at Technische Universität Berlin (1966–1969), and as guest professor at Harvard University for a year (1968).

The start of a new era began in 1981 when his work of ancient Greek religious anthropology, Homo Necans (1972), was published in an Italian translation, followed in 1983 by an English translation. The book is today considered an outstanding account of concepts in Greek religion. He was professor of classical philology at the University of Zurich (1969–1996); visiting professor of classical literature at the University of California for two years (1977 and 1988); lecturer at Harvard in 1982; dean of the philosophical faculty I at the University of Zurich (1986–1988); and presented the Gifford Lectures at the University of St Andrews in Scotland (1989). After holding these posts and receiving numerous honorary awards (including, in 1990, the Balzan Prize for the Study of the Ancient World), he retired as an emeritus in 1996.

He died on 11 March 2015 in Zürich, Switzerland.

== Academic works ==
Three of his most important academic works (a selection from seventeen books and two hundred essays, including encyclopedia contributions and memorabilia), which are still at the base of the study of Hellenic religion, are Homo Necans (1972, English 1983), Greek Religion (1977, English 1985), and Ancient Mystery Cults (1982 lectures, published 1987).

In his preface to the English translation of Homo Necans Burkert, who characterised himself on this occasion as "a philologist who starts from ancient Greek texts and attempts to find biological, psychological and sociological explanations for religious phenomena", expressed some of the principles underlying a book that had seemed somewhat revolutionary to German readers in 1972 in its consistent application of interrelationships of myth and ritual, the application to texts of the kind of functionalism espoused in Jane Ellen Harrison's Themis and the use of structuralism to elucidate an ethology of Greek religion, its social aspect. Burkert confirmed that an impetus for his book had come from Konrad Lorenz, On Aggression, "which seemed to offer new insight into the disquieting manifestations of violence." The book argues that solidarity was achieved among the Greeks through a sacred crime with due reparations: "for the strange prominence of animal slaughter in ancient religion this still seems to be the most economical, and most humane explanation" (p. xv). Its first chapter "Sacrifice as an Act of Killing" offers conclusions that are supported in the ensuing chapters through individual inquiries into myth, festival and ritual, in which the role of poetic creation and re-creation are set aside "in order to confront the power and effect of tradition as fully as possible". The term gods, Burkert concludes, remains fluid, whereas sacrifice is a fact (p. xv).

== Burkert's theory of sacrificial ritual ==
In 1985, Burkert used ancient sources (both literary and visual representations) to put together some of the pieces of how ancient Greek sacrificial ritual actually proceeded, and to link together the ritual with myth. Firstly, under the direction of the priest, priestess, father, mother (at least, in certain women's rites like Thesmophoria), or king, a basket containing the utensils and a bowl of water were placed around the altar. The participants then dipped their hands into the consecrated water, and sprinkled it on the altar, victim and offerer. Salted barleycorns from the basket were thrown on the animal's head and into the altar fire. A lock of hair from the animal is then cut and burned, libation being poured on the altar with prayer. After silence is proclaimed, the music of flutes begins and the animal is slain. The larger animals were killed with a sacrificial axe. The head is turned toward the heavens, and the throat cut. The blood then spreads on the altar and is caught in a vessel. In early literary sources such as the Homeric epics the Iliad and Odyssey, onlooking women raise a cry of worship (ololugma) at this point in the ritual.

After the animal is skinned and cut into pieces, the inner parts are tasted and shared, and a part burned on the altar with incense. The remainder is roasted and eaten by all participants present. If the entrails are of normal shape and color, it is an omen that the sacrifice is acceptable to the gods. In both the Iliad and Odyssey, as well as other early sources such as the Homeric Hymn to Hermes, the priest or sacrifice-leader wrapped the thigh pieces in fat and burned them on the altar. The tail and back, along with other bones and pieces with less meat left over were burned with a libation. After this procedure, it was then that the worshippers shared the roasted meal, while music and dance took place in the service of the gods. At some special festivals, there are instances where everyone in the banquet consumes hundreds of animal sacrifices.

== Works ==
- Weisheit und Wissenschaft: Studien zu Pythagoras, Philolaos und Platon. Nürnberg: Hans Carl, 1962, 496 p. (Habilitationsschrift Erlangen-Nürnberg University).
  - Lore and Science in Ancient Pythagoreanism, trans. Edwin L. Minar, Jr. Harvard University Press, 1972. ISBN 0-674-53918-4.
- Homo necans: Interpretationen Altgriechischer Opferriten und Mythen (in German). Berlin: De Gruyter. 1972. ISBN 3-11-003875-7.
  - Homo necans: Antropologia del Sacrificio Cruento nella Grecia Antica (in Italian). Translated by Francesco Bertolini. Turin: Boringhieri. 1981. ISBN 88-339-5114-6.
  - Homo necans: The Anthropology of Ancient Greek Sacrificial Ritual and Myth. Translated by Peter Bing. Berkeley: University of California Press. 1983. ISBN 0-520-03650-6.
- Griechische Religion der archaischen und klassischen Epoche. Stuttgart, 1977.
  - Greek Religion, trans. John Raffan. Harvard University Press, 1985. ISBN 0-674-36280-2. This has been widely accepted as a standard work in the field.
- Structure and History in Greek Mythology and Ritual. Berkeley: University of California Press. 1979. ISBN 0-520-03771-5.
- Die orientalisierende Epoche in der griechischen Religion und Literatur. Heidelberg, 1984, ISBN 3-533-03528-X
  - The Orientalizing Revolution: Near Eastern Influence on Greek Culture in the Early Archaic Age. trans. Margaret E. Pinder. Cambridge, Mass.: Harvard University Press. 1992. ISBN 0-674-64363-1.
- Ancient Mystery Cults. Harvard University Press, 1987. ISBN 0-674-03386-8, Based on his Jackson Lectures at Harvard, 1982.
- Klassisches Altertum und antikes Christentum. Berlin, 1996, ISBN 3-11-015543-5.
- Creation of the Sacred: Tracks of Biology in Early Religions. Harvard University Press, 1996. ISBN 0-674-17569-7.
- Savage Energies: Lessons of Myth and Ritual in Ancient Greece. trans. Peter Bing. Chicago: University of Chicago Press. 2001. ISBN 0-226-08085-4.
- Die Griechen und der Orient. Munich, 2004. ISBN 3-406-50247-4.
  - Babylon, Memphis, Persepolis: Eastern Contexts of Greek Culture. Harvard University Press, 2004. ISBN 0-674-01489-8.

Articles by Walter Burkert

- “Das hunderttorige Theben und die Datierung der Ilias”, Wiener Studien 89 (1976): 5–21.
- “Kynaithos, Polycrates and the Homeric Hymn to Apollo”, in Arktouros: Hellenic studies presented to B. M. W. Knox. Eds. G. W. Bowersock, W. Burkert & M. C. J. Putnam. Berlin: De Gruyter, 1979, pp. 53–62.
- “Lydia between East and West or how to date the Trojan War: A study in Herodotus”, in The Ages of Homer: a Tribute to Emily Townsend Vermeule, eds. Jane B. Carter & Sarah P. Morris. Austin: University of Texas Press, 1995, pp. 139–148.

== See also ==
- Greek religion
- Human sacrifice
- Mystery religion
- Potnia Theron
