= Aoidos =

Word describing a singer in classical Greece

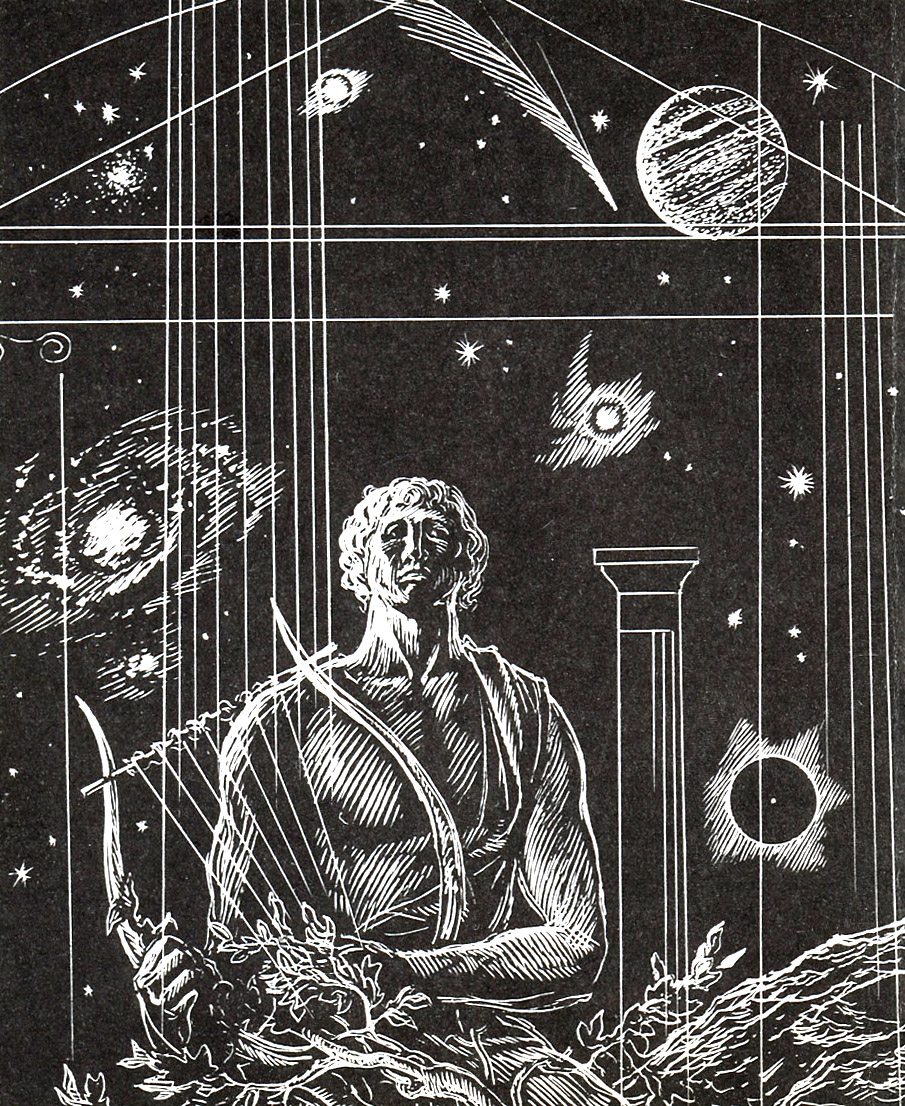
Aoidos and outer space; allegory by Mikhail Kurushin

The Greek word aoidos (ἀοιδός; plural: aoidoi, ἀοιδοί) referred to a classical Greek singer. In modern Homeric scholarship, it is used by some as the technical term for a skilled oral epic poet in the tradition to which the Iliad and Odyssey are believed to belong (compare rhapsode).

== Song and poetry in the Iliad and Odyssey ==
In classical Greek, the word aoidos 'singer', is an agent noun derived from the verb aeidein (ὰείδειν) or adein (ᾄδειν) 'to sing'. It occurs several times in varying forms in the Iliad and Odyssey in relation to poetry:

- Iliad 18.490–496 (on the Shield of Achilles): a wedding song, hymenaios, with pipes, lyres, and dancing
- Odyssey 23.133–135: a wedding song with dancing, led by the singer Phemius: there is no wedding but Odysseus wants to create the impression of festivity while he is killing the suitors
- Iliad 18.567–572 (on the Shield of Achilles): a child sings and plays the lyre to accompany the vintage. The song is the linos
- Iliad 18.593–606 (on the Shield of Achilles): young men and women take part in a singing-dance, molpe
- Odyssey 8.250–385: young men and women take part in a molpe; Demodocus sings and plays the lyre; his song is about the love affair of Ares and Aphrodite
- Iliad 22.391–393: Achilles' young warriors sing a paieon, a song of praise or self-praise, as they drag Hector's body back to their ships
- Iliad 24.720–761: in Troy, singers lead the lament over Hector's body and women mourn after them; the three women who perform laments individually are Andromache, Hecuba and Helen
- Iliad 19.301–338: in the Greek camp, over the body of Patroclus, Achilles sings first, then Briseis followed by the women, then Achilles again followed by the old men
- Odyssey 24.58–62: in the Greek camp (as described by Agamemnon's ghost) the sea nymphs lament over Achilles's body and the Muses respond, followed by all the Greeks
- Iliad 9.186–191: Achilles "pleases his mind and sings of the fame of men", accompanying himself on the lyre; his only audience is Patroclus
- Odyssey 1.150–340: Phemius sings for the suitors, after dinner, a narrative song of the Return from Troy
- Odyssey 8.73–75: Demodocus sings for Alcinous and his guests, after dinner, a narrative song of the quarrel of Odysseus and Achilles
- Odyssey 8.536–538: Demodocus begins to sing for Alcinous and his guests, after dinner, a narrative song of the Wooden Horse.

== The profession of singer ==
In the world described in these poems writing is practically unknown (though its use is implied in one minor episode, the story of Bellerophontes); all poetry is "song", and poets are "singers". Later, in the fifth and fourth centuries, the performance of epic poetry was called rhapsodia, and its performer rhapsodos, but the word does not occur in the early epics or in contemporary lyric poetry, so it is unknown whether Hesiod and the poet(s) of the Iliad and Odyssey would have considered themselves rhapsodes (it has been argued by Walter Burkert, and is accepted by some recent scholars, that rhapsodos was by definition a performer of a fixed, written text and not a creative oral poet). It is not even known to what extent the makers of oral epic poetry were specialists. Phemius and Demodocus, in the Odyssey, are depicted performing non-epic as well as epic songs.

There was, however, certainly a profession of aoidos. Eumaeus, a character in the Odyssey, says that singers (aoidoi), healers, seers and craftsmen are likely to be welcomed as guests, while beggars are not; outside the world described by Homer, Hesiod gives a similar list in the form of a proverb on professional jealousy:

Potter hates potter and craftsman hates craftsman;
Beggar is jealous of beggar, singer of singer.

— Hesiod, Works and Days 25–26.

According to the Iliad and Odyssey singers gained their inspiration from the Muses. Hesiod describes how the Muses visited him while he tended his sheep on Mount Helicon and granted him this inspiration, permitting him to sing of the future as well as the past. An anecdote in the Iliad about Thamyris shows that the Muses could take away what they had given. As in certain other cultures, blind men sometimes became singers: Demodocus in the Odyssey is blind, and the legendary creator of the Iliad and Odyssey, Homer, was often said to have been blind.

The audience for performances by aoidoi varied depending on the genre and circumstances (see list above). Women participated in, and sometimes led, laments, according to the Iliad. Many of the poems of Sappho are addressed to women and seem to assume an audience of women. For narrative (epic) poetry it is sometimes said that the audience was exclusively male; this is an exaggeration (for example, Penelope listens to, and interrupts, one performance depicted in the Odyssey) but it is probably largely true owing to the seclusion of women in early Greece.

== Aoidoi and the creation of the Iliad and Odyssey ==
It has been shown from comparative study of orality that the Iliad and Odyssey (as well as the works of Hesiod) come from a tradition of oral epics. In oral narrative traditions there is no exact transmission of texts; rather, stories are transmitted from one generation to another by bards, who make use of formulas to aid in remembering vast numbers of lines. These poets were bearers of the early Greek oral epic tradition, but little is known of them. Whenever the writing took place (dates between 750 and 600 BC are most often proposed), any contemporary poets and writers who may have known of it did not notice the event or name the poet(s). According to classical Greek sources, Homer lived long before the two poems were written down.

== See also ==
- Aulos – Ancient Greek wind instrument
- Citharede – Classical Greek professional musician
