= Cynaethus =

Cynaethus or Cinaethus (Greek: Κύναιθος or Κίναιθος) of Chios was a rhapsode, a member of the Homeridae, sometimes said to have composed the Homeric Hymn to Apollo.

The main source of information on Cynaethus is a Scholium to Pindar's second Nemean ode. This tells us that the school of Cynaethus was prominent among the Homeridae and put out many of their own compositions under Homer's name, Cynaethus himself composing the Hymn. He was the first to recite the Homeric poems at Syracuse, Magna Graecia, which he did during the 69th Olympiad (504-501 BC). It was once argued that the dating made no sense because the Homeric poems must have reached Syracuse much earlier. However, the original date corresponds well to a probable date of composition of the Homeric Hymn to Apollo, 522 BC.

No doubt basing himself on this or a similar text, Eustathius of Thessalonica names Cynaethus as the first to disseminate the Homeric poems and as a forger of Homeric verses.
