= Rhapsode =

Classical Greek professional performer of epic poetry

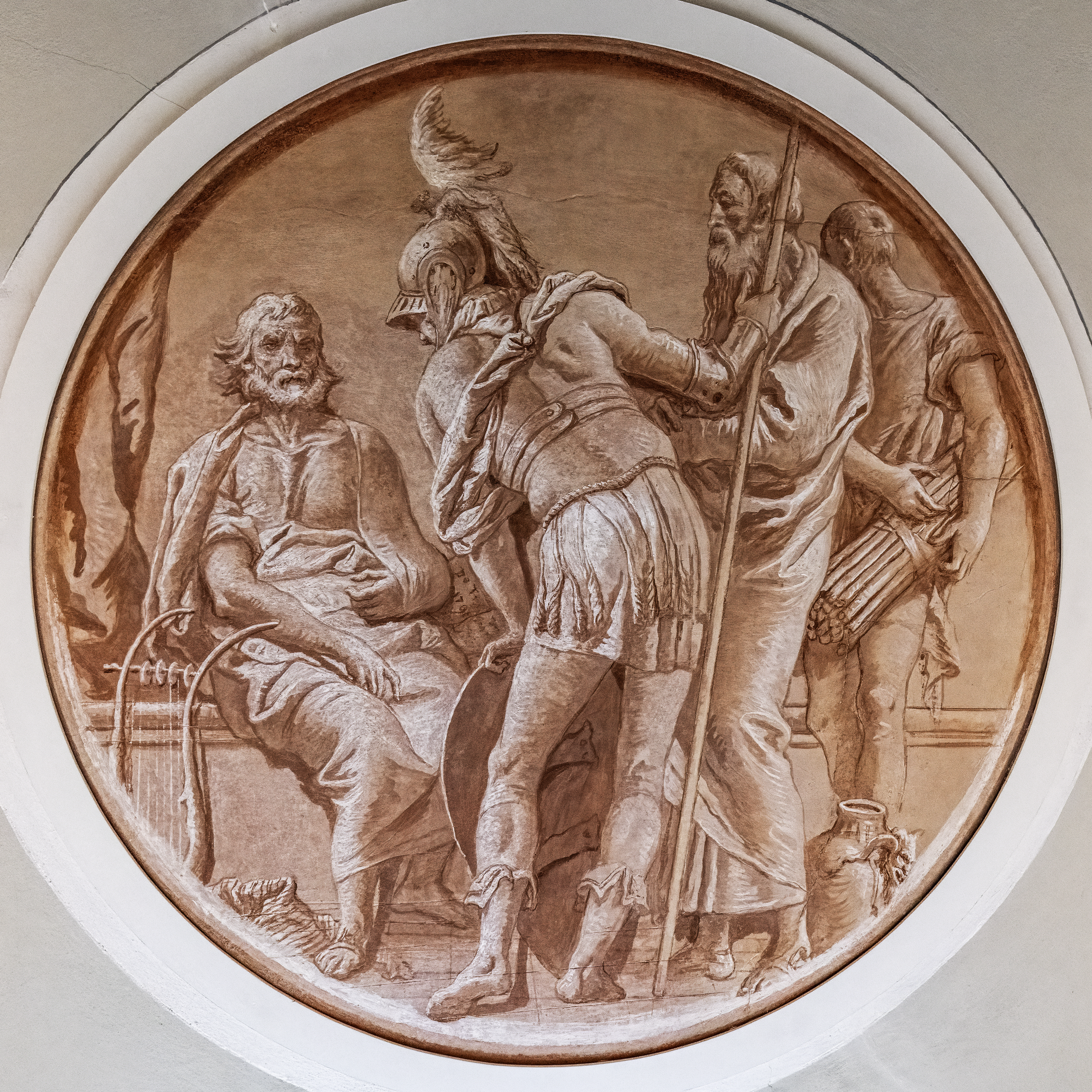
Rhapsode by Giovanni Domenico Tiepolo

A rhapsode (Greek: ῥαψῳδός, "rhapsōidos") or, in modern usage, rhapsodist, refers to a classical Greek professional performer of epic poetry in the fifth and fourth centuries BC (and perhaps earlier). Rhapsodes notably performed the epics of Homer (Iliad and Odyssey) but also the wisdom and catalogue poetry of Hesiod and the satires of Archilochus and others. Plato's dialogue Ion, in which Socrates confronts a star player rhapsode, remains the most coherent source of information on these artists. Often, rhapsodes are depicted in Greek art, wearing their signature cloak and carrying a staff. This equipment is also characteristic of travellers in general, implying that rhapsodes were itinerant performers, moving from town to town. Rhapsodes originated in Ionia, which has been sometimes regarded as Homer's birthplace, and were also known as Homeridai, disciples of Homer, or "singers of stitched lays."

== Etymology and usage ==
The term rhapsode is derived from rhapsōidein (ῥαψῳδεῖν), meaning "to sew songs [together]". This word illustrates how the oral epic poet, or rhapsode, would build a repertoire of diverse myths, tales and jokes to include in the content of the epic poem. Thus it was possible, through experience and improvisatory skills, for him to shift the content of the epos according to the preferred taste of a specific location's audience. However, the outer framework of the epic would remain virtually the same in every "singing", thus securing the projection of underlying themes such as of morality or honour. The performance of epic poetry was called in classical Greek rhapsōidia (ῥαψῳδία), and its performer rhapsōidos. The word does not occur in the early epics, which use the word aoidos (ἀοιδός "singer") for performers in all genres, including this one. It has been argued by Walter Burkert that rhapsōidos was by definition a performer of a fixed, written text.

The word rhapsōidos was in use as early as Pindar (522–443 BC), who implies two different explanations of it, "singer of stitched verse", and "singer with the staff". Of these the first is etymologically correct; the second was suggested by the fact, for which there is early evidence, that the singer was accustomed to hold a staff (ῥάβδος rhabdos) in his hand, perhaps, like the sceptre in the Homeric assembly, as a symbol of the right to a hearing or to "emphasize the rhythm or to give grandeur to their gestures". The etymological meaning is interesting because it is an exact metaphor for what oral narrative poets do: they stitch together formulas, lines and type-scenes in the course of performance. There are indications in Pindar and other authors that oral epic was still a living and popular tradition in the early fifth century BC; all the later evidence, however, is that rhapsodes worked from written texts, and in some cases were compelled by law to do so.

== Performance ==
It is certain that rhapsodes performed competitively, contending for prizes at religious festivals, and that this practice was already well-established by the fifth century BC. The Iliad alludes to the myth of Thamyris, the Thracian singer, who boasted that he could defeat even the Muses in song. He competed with them, was defeated, and was punished for his presumption with the loss of his ability to sing. Historically, the practice is first evident in Hesiod's claim that he performed a song at the funeral games for Amphidamas in Euboea and won a prize. Competitive singing is depicted vividly in the Homeric Hymn to Apollo and mentioned in the two Hymns to Aphrodite. The latter of these may evidently be taken to belong to Salamis in Cyprus and the festival of the Cyprian Aphrodite, in the same way that the Hymn to Apollo belongs to Delos and the Delian gathering.

An early historical mention of rhapsodes occurs in the Histories of Herodotus (c. 440 BC). He tells the story that at Sicyon the ruler Cleisthenes (600–560 BC) expelled the rhapsodes on account of the poems of Homer, because they promoted Argos and the Argives. This description applies very well to the Iliad, in which "Argives" is one of the alternate names for the Greek warriors; it may have suited the Thebaid still better, since Argos was named in the first line of that poem. The incident seems to show that poems performed by rhapsodes had political and propagandistic importance in the Peloponnese in the early sixth century BC.

At Athens, by 330 BC, there was a law that rhapsodes should perform the Homeric poems at every Panathenaic festival; this law is appealed to as glory of Athens by the orator Lycurgus. Perhaps therefore such a custom was exceptional, and we do not know when or by whom it was introduced, although the Platonic dialogue Hipparchus (not really by Plato, but probably of the fourth century BC) attributes it to Hipparchus, son of Peisistratos (Athens). The Hipparchus adds that the law required the rhapsodists to follow on from one another in order, "as they still do". This recurs in a different form in the much later statement of Diogenes Laërtius (1.2.57) that Solon made a law that the poems should be recited "with prompting". Many Athenian laws were falsely attributed to early lawgivers, but it is at least clear that by the fourth century the Homeric poems were a compulsory part of the Panathenaea, and were to be recited in order. They are too long for a single rhapsode or for a single day's performance. Therefore, they had to be divided into parts, and each rhapsode had to take his assigned part (otherwise they would have chosen favourite or prize passages).

Complementary evidence on oral performance of poetry in classical Greece comes in the form of references to a family, clan, or professional association of Homeridae (literally "children of Homer"). These certainly had an existence in the fifth and fourth centuries BC and certainly performed poems attributed to Homer. Pindar seems to count the Homeridae as rhapsodes; other sources do not specifically confirm this categorisation.

== See also ==
- Ashik
- Aoidos
- Aulos
- Bard
- Bhāts
- Filí
- Griot
- Gusans
- Homeridae
- Lirnyk
- Kitharode
- Minstrels
- Skald
- Troubadour
