= Howard Clarke =

American academic (1929–2015)

- Born: June 12, 1929
- Died: January 24, 2015 (aged 85)
- Education: College of the Holy Cross (BA); Harvard University (MA, PhD)
- Occupation: Professor

Howard W. Clarke (June 12, 1929 – January 24, 2015) was an American classicist. He was a professor of classics and comparative literature at the University of California, Santa Barbara (UCSB).

== Education and career ==
Clarke graduated from the College of the Holy Cross in Worcester, Massachusetts, with a Bachelor of Arts in 1950. He then earned his Master of Arts in 1951 and his Ph.D. in classics in 1960 from Harvard University. He was a Teaching Fellow at Harvard (1950–51), a sergeant in the Army Security Agency in Berlin (1953–56), Instructor in Classics, Boston University (1956–1958, 1959–1960); Assistant to Full Professor of Classics at Oakland University, Rochester, Michigan, (1960–1969); and Professor of Classics and Comparative Literature UCSB (1969–1991).

From 1993 he worked as a destination lecturer on cruise ships in the Mediterranean.

He died on 24 January 2015 following a brief illness.

== Bibliography ==
Clarke was the author of The Gospel of Matthew and Its Readers: A Historical Introduction to the First Gospel (Bloomington, Ind. : Indiana University Press, c2003). He has also authored The Art of the Odyssey (Prentice-Hall, 1967; rpt. Duckworth, 19940); Homer's Readers: A Historical Introduction to the Iliad and the Odyssey (University of Delaware Press, 1981), he has translated from the Polish The Return of Odysseus by Stanisław Wyspiański (Indiana University Press, 1966); and he has edited Twentieth Century Interpretations of the Odyssey (Prentice-Hall, 1983) and Vergil's Aeneid in the Dryden Translation (Penn State Press, 1987).
