= Robert Browning (Byzantinist) =

Scottish Byzantinist and university professor

Robert Browning, FBA (/ˈbraʊnɪŋ/; 15 January 1914 – 11 March 1997) was a Scottish Byzantinist and university professor.

== Early career ==
Browning was born in Glasgow in 1914. He attended Kelvinside Academy in that city. He entered the Humanities department of Glasgow University in 1931, graduating in 1935. As Snell Exhibitioner at Balliol College, Oxford, he acquired first class degrees in Mods and Greats as well as several prizes (Nowlands, Ireland, Craven, Ferguson, De Paravicini, and Jenkyns). During his time at Glasgow University, Browning became proficient in several Eastern European languages, beginning with Albanian.

In 1939, Browning received a second degree from Glasgow, and began a seven-year service with the Royal Artillery. During that time he mastered the Georgian language. He served on the General Staff in Italy, and on the Allied Control Commission in Sofia, Bulgaria. In Belgrade, Yugoslavia, he was assistant to the British Military Attaché.

== Lecturing career, honours, and retirement activities ==
In 1946 Browning returned to the academic milieu, first as a Harmsworth Senior Scholar at Merton College, Oxford, and then moved to London University. From 1947 to 1965 he taught in University College London, and from 1965 to his retirement (1981) he was Professor of Classics and Ancient History at Birkbeck, University of London.

Following his retirement from the professorship Browning served in an advisory capacity at Dumbarton Oaks. He advised the University of Cyprus. He received an honorary doctorate from the University of Birmingham, and once received the Key to the City at Athens.

In 1969, Browning authored an influential handbook, Medieval and Modern Greek. He served as chair to the Society for the Promotion of Hellenic Studies and the Society for the Promotion of Byzantine Studies. He was review editor of the Journal of Hellenic Studies, and editor of the bibliography of the Byzantinische Zeitschrift magazine. He was vice-president of the International Association of Byzantine Studies from 1981. His 1971 book, Justinian and Theodora, was widely recognized.

Browning belonged to the Communist Party Historians Group.

Browning's first festschrift, aptly titled Maistor, was published on Australian initiative at Canberra, Australia, in 1984. A second, Philellen, was published on Greek initiative in Venice, Italy, in 1997.

Browning's résumé listed:

- Lecturer, University College London (1947–1955)
- Reader, University College London (1955–1965)
- Professor of Classics and Ancient History, Birkbeck College, London (1965–1981) (emeritus)
- Fellow of the British Academy (1978)

== Personal life ==
In 1946, he married Galina Chichekova, whom he had met in Sofia. They had two daughters. In 1972, he married Ruth Gresh, whom he had met in Cairo, Egypt. He died of old age in London in 1997.

== Works (selection) ==
- Notes on Byzantine Prooimia (H. Böhlaus Nachf: Wien 1966)
- Medieval and Modern Greek (Hutchinson: London 1969)
- Justinian and Theodora (Weidenfeld and Nicolson: London 1971; revised ed. 1987)
- Byzantium and Bulgaria: A Comparative Study Across the Early Medieval Frontier (Temple Smith: London 1975)
- The Emperor Julian (University of California: Berkeley 1976; Weidenfeld and Nicolson: London 1977)
- The Byzantine Empire (Weidenfeld and Nicolson: London 1980; revised ed. 1992)
- The Greeks: Classical, Byzantine and Modern (editor) (W. W. Norton & Co: New York 1985)
