= Homeridae =

Claimed descendants of Homer

The Homeridae or Homeridai or Homerids (Ancient Greek: Ὁμηρίδαι) was a term used for those who performed or recited the poems of Homer.

It was also the name of a family, clan or professional lineage on the island of Chios. According to one tradition, the family took this name because they were believed to be descended from Homer. Another explanation, however, rejects this idea and claims that the name actually comes from the word for "pledges" (homeron; ὁμήρων). According to this story, the women of Chios once went mad during a festival of Dionysus and fought against the men. The conflict ended only after they exchanged brides and bridegrooms as pledges and the descendants of these couples came to be called the "Homeridae".

The origin of the name seems obvious: in classical Greek the word should mean "children of Homer". An analogous name, Asclepiadae, identified a clan or guild of medical practitioners as "children of Asclepius". However, since the existence of the Homeridae is authenticated while that of Homer is not, and since Greek homeros is a common noun meaning "hostage", it was suggested even in ancient times that the Homeridae were in reality "children (or descendants) of hostages". The natural further step is to argue that Homer, the supposed founder, is a mythical figure, a mere back-formation, deriving his name from that of the later guild.

Their influence on the dark early history of transmission of the Homeric texts, though incalculable, is sure to have been conservative.

Evidence on the Homeridae relates to the late sixth, fifth and fourth centuries BC, after which nothing more is heard of them.

The first contemporary mention of this group is in a poem of about 485 BC by Pindar:

In the same way as the Homeridae,
Singers of stitched words, usually
Begin with an address to Zeus ...

A "singer of stitched words" is a literal definition of a rhapsode.

Later contemporary references come in fourth-century texts, in the works of Plato and Isocrates. In one of his essays, written around 350 BC, Isocrates says:

Some of the Homeridae tell the story that Helen appeared to Homer in a dream and told him to make a poem about the Trojan expedition.

At a slightly earlier date Plato makes a similar comment:

I believe that some of the Homeridae recite two hymns to Eros from among the esoteric poems. One of them is quite disrespectful to the god, and, what's more, the metre is incorrect! This is what they sing:

Now this winged god is called by mortals Eros,
But immortals say "Pteros" because love must grow wings.

There are two further mentions, in Plato's Republic and in the Ion. In the latter the rhapsode Ion claims that he should be "crowned by the Homeridae" for his work in promoting the poems of Homer.

Supplementary information, of uncertain validity, is found in later Greek antiquarian writings. A scholarly commentary on Pindar's poem gives the following details:

The name Homeridae originally meant descendants of Homer, who maintained the tradition of singing his poems, but afterwards was applied to rhapsodes who did not claim literal descent from him. One famous member, Cynaethus of Chios, was at the centre of a group who were specially active in composing new poems and attaching them to Homer's works. Cynaethus himself was the author of the Homeric Hymn to Apollo and was the first to perform Homeric poems at Syracuse.

A second source is Harpocration, who names three early writers of Greek local history whose works are now lost: Acusilaus and Hellanicus of Lesbos apparently stated that the Homeridae were named after Homer, while Seleucus said that they were not. Finally, the geographer Strabo says that the people of Chios adduced the Homeridae as evidence that Homer came from Chios; which implies, though Strabo does not say it, that the Homeridae, too, came from Chios.

It seems from this evidence that the Homeridae were a guild of oral performers (rhapsodes, as implied by Pindar's phrase "singers of stitched words") who claimed to inherit Homer's tradition and performed poems ascribed to Homer, no doubt including the Iliad and Odyssey. They also developed stories about how the poems had originated, such as Homer's dream of Helen. Like other rhapsodes, they travelled widely, but they were perhaps based on Chios. Certain Homeridae were active in adding new poems to the tradition. Due to Pisistratus (tyrant of Athens) that Homeric reformation became compulsory. The Homeridae, like other rhapsodes, switched to a designated text which they themselves had approved. In this way, the Homeridae became the authors of some of the first "authoritative" versions of Homeric poetry, and removed much of the improvisation which had hitherto characterized the art form.

Incidentally, some people believed these attributions: Thucydides, though not easily fooled, quotes from a version of the Homeric Hymn to Apollo similar to the text now known and confidently ascribes it to Homer.

== Notes ==
=== Bibliography ===
- Andersen, Øivind (2011), "Homeridae", The Homer Encyclopedia, Wiley, doi:10.1002/9781444350302.wbhe0607, ISBN 978-1-4443-5030-2
