= Type scene =

Literary convention by narrator

A type scene is a literary convention employed by a narrator across a set of scenes, or related to scenes (place, action) already familiar to the audience. The similarities with, and differences from, the established type are used to illuminate developments in plot and character. Robert Louis Fowler wrote, "The technique of the type-scene offers the poet a basic scaffolding, but it also allows the poet to adapt each scene for specific purposes."

Much of the foundational work for such analysis was by Walter Arend in his 1933 book, Die typischen Szenen bei Homer, on the Iliad of Homer.

Later work by Robert Alter employed similar examination to parts of the Hebrew Bible, in particular to the betrothal type-scene at the well in Genesis. Another type scene that Alter identifies is the annunciation of the birth of the hero to a barren woman, such as the birth of Samson to Manoah's wife, or the birth of Samuel to Hannah. Other scholars have suggested other type scenes in the Hebrew Bible, such as the heavenly council, theophany, prophetic concealment and the dying monarch.

Type scenes have also been identified in Old English and Old Norse literature.
