= Anteias =

Son of Odysseus and Circe

Anteias or Antias (Ancient Greek: Ἀντείας or Ἀντίας) was in Roman mythology a figure in some versions of Rome's foundation myth. He was one of the three sons of Odysseus by Circe, and brother to Rhomos and Ardeas, each of whom were said to have founded a major Roman city, much like the Romulus and Remus myth. The town of Anteia or Antium in Italy was said to have been founded by, and taken its name from, this Anteias.

This characterization primarily comes to us from the writings of the historian Xenagoras. Xenagoras was likely writing at a time that Antium was being assimilated into the identity of Rome, Antium having been the capital of the Volsci people before their defeat in the Roman-Volscian wars of the 4th century BCE, after which the Romans sent colonists to Antium to more fully enculturate the city as "Roman". Modern scholars believe this characterization to indicate that Antium was considered at the time to be a city on equal footing with Rome and Ardea, the cities represented by the other two brothers.
