= Rhomos =

Mythical character

Rhomos (Ancient Greek: Ῥώμος) was in Greek and Roman mythology a son of Odysseus and Circe. He was said to have founded Rome.

Xenagoras writes that Odysseus and Circe had three sons, Rhomos (Ῥώμος), Anteias (Ἀντείας) and Ardeias (Ἀρδείας), who built three cities and called them after their own names (Rome, Antium, and Ardea).

Martin P. Nilsson speculates that this foundation story became an embarrassment as Rome became more powerful and tensions with the Greeks grew. Being descendants of the Greeks was no longer preferable, so the Romans settled on the Trojan foundation myth instead. Nilsson further speculates that the name of Romos was changed by the Romans to the native name Romulus, but the name Romos (later changed to the native Remus) was never forgotten by the people, and so these two names came to stand side by side as founders of the city.
