= Poliporthes =

Son of Odysseus in Greek mythology

In Greek mythology Poliporthes (also known as Ptoliporthes or Ptoliporthus) (Ancient Greek: Πολιπόρθης and Πτολιπόρθης) was the son born to Odysseus and Penelope after the former's return from the Trojan War. He was so named ("destroyer of cities") because Odysseus had sacked the city of Troy (cf., e.g., Od.8.3).

In the Bibliotheca of Apollodorus there is a retelling of the Odyssey: after Odysseus returned home and killed the suitors he departed to Thesprotia and had a child named Polypoetes with Callidice, the queen of the region, before returning to Ithaca. Upon returning, he discovered that Penelope had given birth to Poliporthes. Pausanias mentions a now-lost epic poem Thesprotis, in which he is present.

Alternatively, he was the son of Telemachus and Nausicaa and Odysseus gave him this name.
