= Telegony =

Lost sequel to the Odyssey

The Telegony (Ancient Greek: Τηλεγόνεια or Τηλεγονία, romanized: Tēlegóneia, Tēlegonía) is a lost epic poem of Ancient Greek literature. It is named after Telegonus, the son of Odysseus by Circe, whose name ("born far away") is indicative of his birth on Aeaea, far from Odysseus' home of Ithaca. It was part of the Epic Cycle of poems that recounted the myths of the Trojan War as well as the events that led up to and followed it. The story of the Telegony comes chronologically after that of the Odyssey and is the final episode in the Epic Cycle. The poem was sometimes attributed in antiquity to Cinaethon of Sparta (8th century BC), but in one source it is said to have been stolen from Musaeus by Eugammon of Cyrene (6th century BC) (see Cyclic poets). Its contents are known from surviving summaries by later authors, most notably Eutychius Proclus. The poem comprised two books of verse in dactylic hexameter.

== Title ==
In Antiquity, the Telegony may have also been known as the Thesprotis (Greek: Θεσπρωτίς), which is referred to once by Pausanias in the 2nd century AD; alternatively, the Thesprotis may have been a name for the first book of the Telegony, which is set in Thesprotia. Such naming of isolated episodes within a larger epic was common practice for the ancient readers of the Homeric epics.

A third possibility is that there was a wholly separate epic called the Thesprotis; and yet a fourth possibility is that the Telegony and Thesprotis were two separate poems that were at some stage compiled into a single Telegony.

== Date ==
The date of composition of the Telegony is uncertain. Cyrene, the native city of purported author Eugammon, was founded in 631 BC; but the narrative details may have existed prior to Eugammon's version, perhaps even in the oral tradition. There is a distinct possibility that the author of the Odyssey knew at least some version of the Telegony story (the Thesprotian episode and Telegonus' unusual spear in the Telegony may have been based on Tiresias' prophecy in Odyssey book 11; but it is also possible that the Odyssey poet used the Telegonus story as a basis for Tiresias' prophecy). The poem is thought to have been composed in the 7th or more commonly in the 6th century BC, with the year 570 BC proposed as the latest possible date.

== Content ==
Only two lines of the poem's original text survive. For its storyline, we are dependent primarily on a summary of the Telegonus myth in the Chrestomathy of one "Proclus".

The Telegony comprises two distinct episodes: Odysseus' voyage to Thesprotia, and the story of Telegonus. Probably each of the two books of the Telegony related one of these episodes. The poem opens after the events depicted in the Odyssey. According to Proclus' summary, the Telegony opens with the burial of Penelope's suitors. Odysseus makes sacrifices to the Nymphs. He makes a voyage to Elis, where he visits an otherwise unknown figure Polyxenos, who gives him a bowl depicting the story of Trophonius. Odysseus returns to Ithaca and then travels to Thesprotia, presumably to make the sacrifices commanded by Tiresias in Odyssey 11. There, he weds the Thesprotian queen Callidice, who bears him a son, Polypoetes. Odysseus fights for the Thesprotians in a war against the neighbouring Brygoi; the gods participate in the war, Ares routing Odysseus and the Thesprotians, countered by Athena, ever Odysseus' patron; Apollo intervenes between the battling gods. Later, after the death of Callidice, Odysseus makes their son Polypoetes king of Thesprotia and returns to Ithaca.

Meanwhile, it transpires that Circe, with whom Odysseus had an affair for a year in the Odyssey (books 10–12), has borne his son, Telegonus (Τηλέγονος, "born far away"). He grows up living with Circe on the island of Aeaea. On the goddess Athena's advice, Circe tells him the name of his father. In a detail inserted into the account in the Epitome of the Bibliotheke, she gives him a supernatural spear to defend himself, which is tipped with the sting of a poisonous stingray and was made by the god Hephaestus. A storm forces Telegonus onto Ithaca without his realizing where he is. As is customary for Homeric heroes in unfriendly land, he commits piracy, and unwittingly begins stealing Odysseus' cattle. Odysseus comes to defend his property. During the ensuing fight, Telegonus kills Odysseus with his unusual spear, thereby partially fulfilling Tiresias' prophecy in Odyssey 11 that death would come to Odysseus "out of the sea" (i.e., the poison of the ray). (In another respect, however, Odysseus' death contradicts the prophecy of Tiresias, who predicted (Od. 11.135) that a "gentle death" would come to Odysseus "in sleek old age.") As Odysseus lies dying, he and Telegonus recognize one another, and Telegonus laments his mistake. Telegonus brings his father's corpse, Penelope, and Odysseus' other son Telemachus, back to Aeaea, where Odysseus is buried and Circe makes the others immortal. Telegonus marries Penelope, and Telemachus marries Circe.

== Later traditions ==
According to a later Hellenistic tradition, Circe brought Odysseus back to life after his death, and he arranged for Telemachus to marry his half-sister Cassiphone, Odysseus and Circe's daughter. But after a quarrel with Circe, Telemachus slew his mother-in-law, and in rage Cassiphone killed him, avenging thus the murder of her mother.

The Telegony's plot inspired Sophocles's lost tragedy Odysseus Acanthoplex. From what is known of the play's story, Telegonus arrived at Ithaca, where he revealed himself to his father. A fight ensued and Telegonus killed Odysseus without knowing who he was.

The 1st-century AD Roman fabulist Hyginus differs from Proclus in adding a few details. First, it is both Odysseus and Telemachus who engage Telegonus in combat. Hyginus then adds that Odysseus had received an oracle to beware his son. Finally, Hyginus attributes to Telegonus a son named Italus, the eponymous founder of Italy; and to Telemachus he attributes a son named Latinus, whose name was given to the Latin language.

Numerous Latin poets make Telegonus the founder of Praeneste or Tusculum, important Latin towns.

== Dante's invention ==
In Dante's Divine Comedy, in the eighth bolgia of the Inferno, Dante and his guide meet Ulysse among the false counsellors, and receive a variant accounting of Ulysse's death "from the sea", in a five-month journey beyond the Pillars of Hercules, that has ended in a whirlpool drowning as the mariners approach the mountain of Purgatory. No Greek source was available to Dante, only the Latin recensions of Dictys and Dares.

Among the many operas based on the myths of Odysseus and those around him, there is but one based on Telegonus, Carlo Grua's Telegono (premiered in Düsseldorf, 1697) of which an aria "Dia le mosse a miei contenti" may be noted. Divine intervention, a death and multiple weddings at the end all assorted easily with the conventions of opera seria.

== Sources ==
- Mayor, Adrienne (2016). The Amazons; Lives and Legends of Warrior Women Across the Ancient World. Princeton University Press.
- Tsagalis, Christos; Fantuzzi, Marco (2015). The Greek Epic Cycle and Its Ancient Reception, A Companion. Cambridge University Press.
- Malkin, Irad (1998). The Returns of Odysseus; Colonization and Ethnicity. University of California Press.

== Editions ==
- Online editions (English translation):
  - Fragments of complete Epic Cycle translated by H.G. Evelyn-White, 1914; Project Gutenberg edition
  - Theoi Project — Apollodorus, Epitome
  - Theoi Project — Hyginus, Fabula 127
- Print editions (Greek):
  - A. Bernabé 1987, Poetarum epicorum Graecorum testimonia et fragmenta pt. 1 (Leipzig: Teubner)
  - M. Davies 1988, Epicorum Graecorum fragmenta (Göttingen: Vandenhoek & Ruprecht)
- Print editions (Greek with English translation):
  - M.L. West 2003, Greek Epic Fragments (Cambridge, Massachusetts: Harvard University Press) ISBN 0-674-99605-4
