= Nymphis =

Ancient Greek writer

Nymphis (Ancient Greek: Νύμφις), son of Xenagoras, a native of Heraclea Pontica, lived in the middle of the third century BC, and was a person of distinction in his native land, as well as a historical writer of some note.

He was sent as ambassador to the Galatians to propitiate that people, when the inhabitants of Heraclea Pontica had offended them by assisting Mithridates II of Pontus, the son of Ariobarzanes of Pontus, with whom the Galatians were at war. As Ariobarzanes was succeeded by this Mithridates about 240 BCE, we may refer the embassy to this year. Memnon likewise mentions (c. 11) a Nymphis as one of the exiles in 281 BCE, when Seleucus I Nicator, after the death of Lysimachus, threatened Heracleia; but notwithstanding the remark of Clinton (sub anno 281) the interval of forty-one years between the two events just mentioned, leads to the conclusion that the latter Nymphis was a different person from the historian, more especially as Memnon, in the former case, expressly distinguishes Nymphis by the epithet "historian" (ὁ ἱστορικός). Nymphis was the author of three works, which are referred to by the ancient writers:

- Concerning Alexander, his successors, and their descendants (Περὶ Ἀλεξάνδρου καὶ τῶν Διαδόχων), in twenty-four books. This work ended at the accession of Ptolemy III Euergetes in 246 BCE.
- Concerning Heraclea Pontica (Περὶ Ἡερακλείας), in thirteen books, gave the history of his native city to the overthrow of the tyrants in 281 BCE.
- Circumnavigating Asia (Περίπλους Ἀσίας)
