= Telegonus (son of Odysseus) =

Greek mythological figure

In Greek mythology, Telegonus (/təˈlɛɡənəs/; Ancient Greek: Τηλέγονος, "born afar") was the son of Circe and Odysseus and thus, brother to Agrius and Latinus or Nausithous and Nausinous, and Cassiphone. In some accounts, he was called the son of the nymph Calypso and Odysseus instead.

== Mythology ==
When Telegonus had grown to manhood, his mother Circe disclosed the identity of his father Odysseus and sent Telegonus in search of him. Driven to Ithaca by a storm and assailed by hunger, Telegonus began plundering the island. Odysseus and his oldest son, Telemachus, defended their city and, in the ensuing melée, Telegonus accidentally killed his father with a lance tipped with the venomous spine of a stingray. Telemachus married Telegonus' mother, the enchantress Circe, while Telegonus took to wife Odysseus' widow Penelope. By Penelope, he was the father of Italus who, according to some accounts, gave his name to Italy. What appears to be later tradition holds that Odysseus would also be resurrected by Circe after he was killed by Telegonus.

The story of Telegonus meeting his father was told in the Telegony, an early Greek epic that does not survive except in a summary, but that was attributed to Eugamon or Eugammon of Cyrene and written as a sequel to the Odyssey. Variants of the story are found in later poets: for example, in a tragedy by Sophocles, Odysseus Acanthoplex (which also does not survive), Odysseus finds out from an oracle that he is doomed to be killed by his son. He assumes that this means Telemachus, whom he promptly banishes to a nearby island. When Telegonus arrives on Ithaca, he approaches Odysseus' house, but the guards do not admit him to see his father; a commotion arises, and Odysseus, thinking it is Telemachus, rushes out and attacks. In the fighting, he is killed by Telegonus. This story has many similarities with the more well-known tale of Oedipus.

In Italic and Roman mythology, Telegonus became known as the founder of Tusculum, a city just to the southeast of Rome, and sometimes also as the founder of Praeneste, a city in the same region (modern Palestrina). Ancient Roman poets regularly used phrases such as "walls of Telegonus" (e.g. Propertius 2.32) or "Circaean walls" to refer to Tusculum.

The Mamilia gens of Rome claimed to be descendants from Telegonus and Penelope through their daughter Mamilia.

== See also ==
- Gáe Bulg
- Leucippus
- Corythus
