= Latinus =

Figure in Greco-Roman mythology

Latinus from Guillaume Rouillé's Promptuarii Iconum Insigniorum

Latinus (Latin: Latinus; Ancient Greek: Λατῖνος,, romanized: Latînos, or Λατεῖνος, Lateînos lit. 'from Latium' or 'Latian') was a figure both in Greek and Roman mythology. He is often associated with the heroes of the Trojan War, namely Odysseus and Aeneas. Although his appearance in the Aeneid is complemented by an appearance in Greek mythology, the two pictures are irreconcilable, meaning that he cannot be seen as one character.

== Greek mythology ==
In Hesiod's Theogony, Latinus was the son of Odysseus and Circe who ruled the Tyrrhenians with his brothers Agrius and Telegonus. According to the Byzantine author John the Lydian, Hesiod, in the Catalogue of Women, considered Latinus to be the brother of Graecus, who is described as the son of Zeus by Pandora, the daughter of Deucalion and Pyrrha. In his Fabularum Liber (or Fabulae), Gaius Julius Hyginus recorded the myth that Latinus was a son of Circe and Telemachus (a son of Odysseus). That relation possibly dated to the lost epic Telegony of Eugammon of Cyrene. He was also depicted as the son of Odysseus and Calypso.

== Roman mythology ==
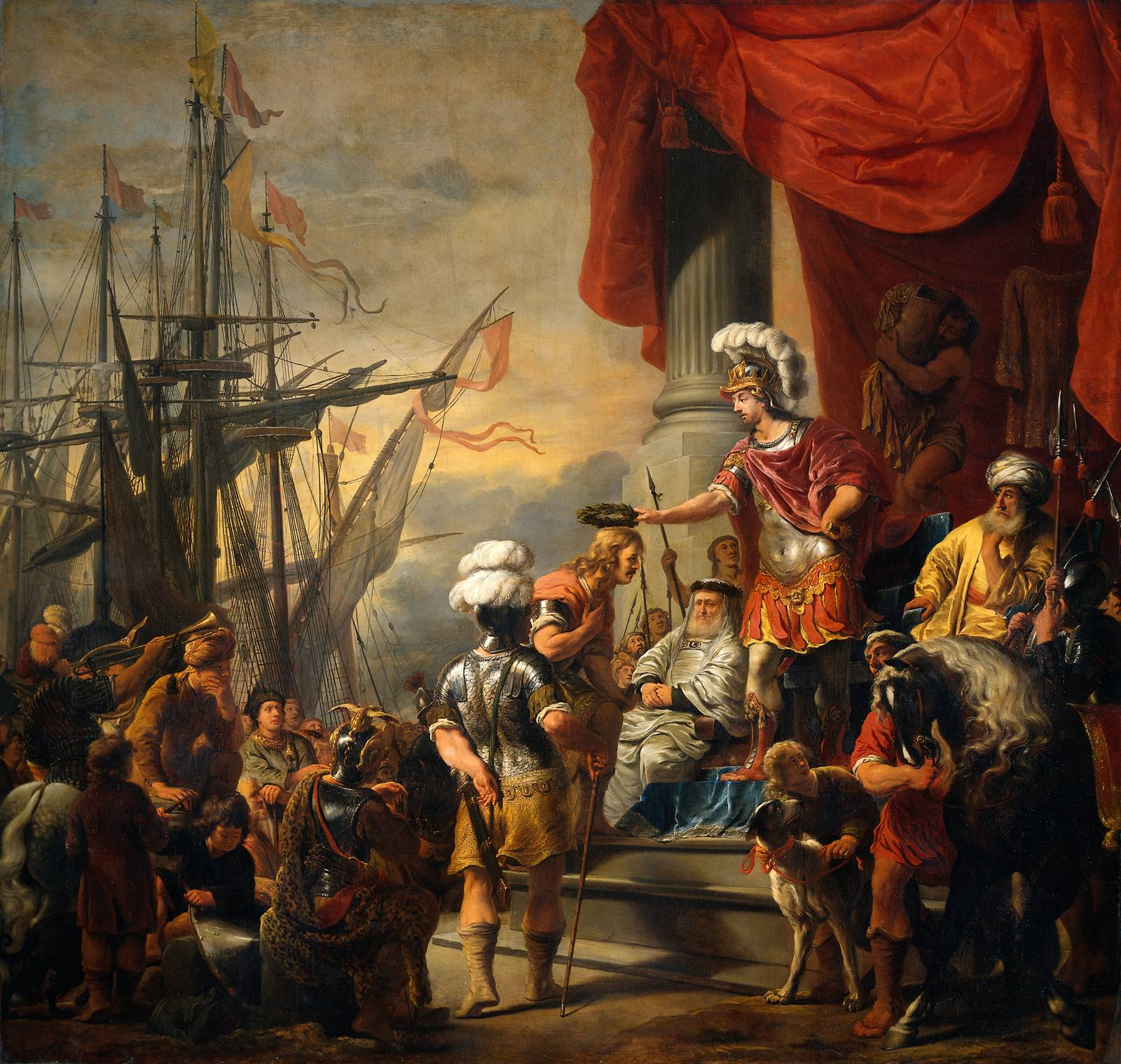
Aeneas at the Court of Latinus by Ferdinand Bol; Rijksmuseum Amsterdam

In later Roman mythology (notably Virgil's Aeneid), Latinus, or Lavinius, was a king of the Latins. He is sometimes described as the son of Faunus and Marica, and father of Lavinia with his wife, Amata. Dionysius of Halicarnassus, however, claims he was a son of Heracles who only passed for a son of Faunus. He hosted Aeneas's army of exiled Trojans and offered them the chance to reorganize their life in Old Latium. His wife Amata wished his daughter Lavinia to be betrothed to Turnus, king of the Rutuli, but Latinus and the gods insisted that he give her instead to Aeneas; consequently, Turnus declared war on Aeneas and was killed two weeks into the conflict. Ascanius, the son of Aeneas, later founded Alba Longa and was the first in a long series of kings leading to Romulus and Remus, the founders of Rome.

== English mythology ==
The English once widely claimed as history, an original peopling of the isle — at the time a land only of fantastical giants — by descendants of the above-mentioned Eneas, perhaps via Latinus, and at least with Latinus as step-family of an ancestor, though even in the time of the Renaissance, a non-English audience as well at least one English writer found details of the stories less than convincing.

The island known later as Britain, was also previously known as Alba, similarity of name supporting connection to the city of Alba in Italy, said to have been built by Alcanius, son of Eneas, and third ruler of the Latins after Latinus, being either his grandson or step-grandson.

Ignoring the obviously far-fetched elements of this foundation myth of Britain, Johannes Rastell writing in 1529 questioned, along these lines: Supposing the original Brits were descendants of a line of Latin kings — Brute the son of Silvius, son of Alcanius, son of Eneas who came to the Italian Peninsula from Troy — then why should such a fact have escaped record in the writings of Julius Caesar when he had personally surveyed the lands there he had conquered for Rome by 48 BC? And indeed, why should the son Brutus have escaped from Latin histories altogether, given they did deal with Silvius and Alcanius, and 'all theyr childera & what became of them & how they endyd that succeeded them as kyngis'?

Other details he found were able to be discounted without resort to factual records, or with only very few facts needed other than everyday experience. Were the early inhabitants of Britain giants, descended from the Devil in union with 32 daughters of a king Dioclisian of Syria? To Rastell, if the devil had power to sow such seeds at the earlier time, then why not in his own time? Where were the giants today?

Other fanciful elements he reduced by logical deduction from intuitive psychological insights, for example the greatly diminished chance of 32 daughters married to 32 kings on a single day, and all cooperating to kill those 32 husbands in a single night; or in combination with analysis of logistical realities, such as the suggested voyage of all 32 murderous widows to Britain without dispersion or diversion, over three thousand miles.

One renaissance writer Rastell was further able to discount the likelihood of any factuality to that ancient tale, due to his failure to discover, after diligent research, any authentic record of its origin or explanation as to why such record should be absent.

=== Further reading ===
- One surviving version of the Brut Chronicle is a manuscript known as Free Library of Philadelphia, Lewis MS 238.

== See also ==
- Latium
- Latin kings of Alba Longa
- Aborigines (mythology)

== Notes ==
Legendary titles
New creation	king of the Aborigines; 1217–1180 BC	Succeeded by Aeneas
