= Odysseus =

Legendary Greek king of Ithaca

- King of Ithaca
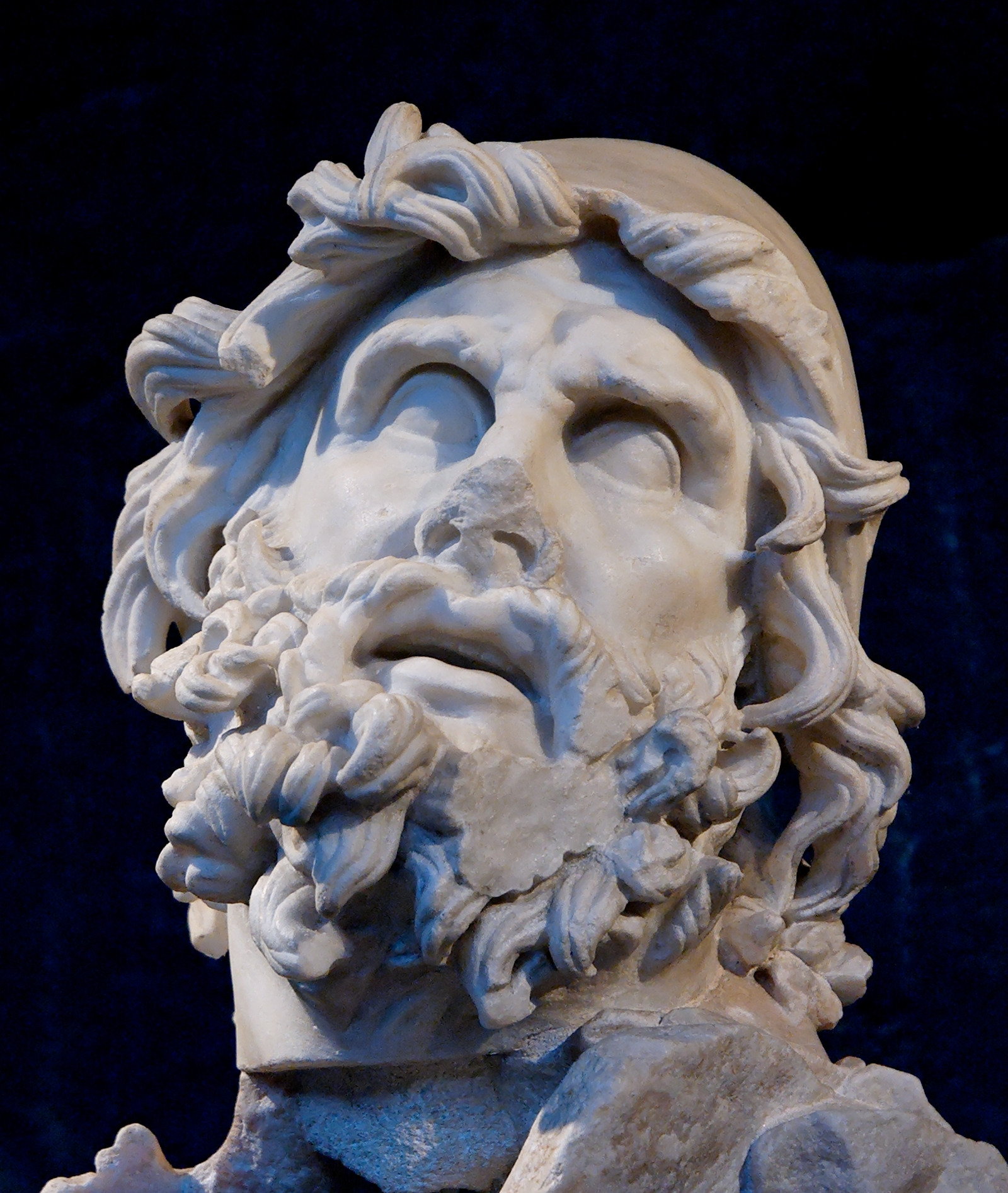
- Head of Odysseus from a Roman period Hellenistic marble group representing Odysseus blinding Polyphemus, found at the villa of Tiberius at Sperlonga, Italy
- Predecessor: Laertes
- Successor: Telemachus
- Dynasty: House of Ithaca
- Weapon: Bow
- Battles: Trojan War
- Animals: Argos
- Texts: Odyssey, Iliad, Telegony
- Associated deities: Athena, Hermes, Zeus, Circe, Calypso, Poseidon

Genealogy
- Born: Ithaca
- Died: Ithaca
- Parents: Laertes and Anticlea
- Siblings: Ctimene
- Consort: Penelope
- Children: Telemachus, Agrius, Anteias, Ardeas, Cassiphone, Latinus, Rhomos, Telegonus, Auson, Nausinous, Nausithous, Polypoetes, Euryalus, Dorukles, Poliporthes, Arcesilaus, Leontophonus, Persepolis (or granddaughter)

In Greek and Roman mythology, Odysseus (/əˈdɪsiəs/, US also /oʊ-/; Ancient Greek: Ὀδυσσεύς, Ὀδυσεύς, romanized: Odysseús, Odyseús, IPA: [o.dy(s̠).s̠ěu̯s̠]), also known by the Latin variant Ulysses (/juˈlɪsiz/, UK also /ˈjulɪsiz/; Latin: Ulysses, Ulixes), is a legendary Greek king of Ithaca and the hero of Homer's epic poem, the Odyssey. Odysseus also plays a key role in Homer's Iliad and other works in that same epic cycle.

As the son of Laërtes and Anticlea, husband of Penelope, and father of Telemachus, Acusilaus, and Telegonus, Odysseus is renowned for his intellectual brilliance, guile, and versatility (polytropos), and he is thus known by the epithet Odysseus the Cunning (Ancient Greek: μῆτις, romanized: mêtis, lit. 'cunning intelligence'). He is most famous for his nostos, or "homecoming", which took him ten eventful years after the decade-long Trojan War.

== Name, etymology, and epithets ==
The form Ὀδυσ(σ)εύς Odys(s)eus is used starting in the epic period and through the classical period, but various other forms are also found. In vase inscriptions, there are the variants Oliseus (Ὀλισεύς), Olyseus (Ὀλυσεύς), Olysseus (Ὀλυσσεύς), Olyteus (Ὀλυτεύς), Olytteus (Ὀλυττεύς) and Ōlysseus (Ὠλυσσεύς). The form Oulixēs (Οὐλίξης) is attested in an early source in Magna Graecia (Ibycus, according to Diomedes Grammaticus), while the Greek grammarian Aelius Herodianus has Oulixeus (Οὐλιξεύς).

The etymology of the name Odysseus is unknown. It has also been suggested that the name is of non-Greek origin, possibly not even Indo-European, with an unknown etymology. Robert S. P. Beekes has suggested a Pre-Greek origin. Homer relates it to various forms of the verb odussomai (ὀδύσσομαι) 'to be wroth against, to hate'. In Book 19 of the Odyssey, where Odysseus's early childhood is recounted, Euryclea asks the boy's grandfather Autolycus to name him. Euryclea seems to suggest a name like Polyaretos, "for he has much been prayed for" (πολυάρητος) but Autolycus, "apparently in a sardonic mood", decided to give the child another name commemorative of "his own experience in life": "Since I have been angered (ὀδυσσάμενος odyssamenos) with many, both men and women, let the name of the child be Odysseus". Other ancient authors linked the name to the verbs oduromai (ὀδύρομαι) "to lament, bewail" and ollumi (ὄλλυμι) "to perish, to be lost". Odysseus often receives the patronymic epithet Laertiades (Λαερτιάδης), "son of Laërtes".

In Latin, he was known as Ulixēs or (considered less correct) Ulyssēs. Some have supposed that "there may originally have been two separate figures, one called something like Odysseus, the other something like Ulixes, who were combined into one complex personality." The origin of the Latin form has been explained in different ways. In the nineteenth century it was derived from Etruscan, following K. O. Müller, or alternatively from the Sicel Οὐλίξης. More recent treatments connect it with the Greek forms with l: Beekes lists Latin Ulixēs among these by-forms, alongside the vase inscriptions and Herodian's Οὐλιξεύς, and Maras derives it from a Greek form reconstructed as *Olixes, that is from the name as it circulated outside the Homeric tradition.

In Etruria, the name and the stories of Odysseus were adopted under a number of variants, among them utuse, utuśe, utuze, utzte, uθste, uθuste and uθuze, which appear as captions beside representations of the hero on scarabs, mirrors and cinerary urns between the fifth and the second centuries BC. Maras traces the Etruscan borrowing, by contrast, to the form with d, that is to the name as it circulated within the Homeric epic tradition.

In the Iliad and Odyssey, Homer uses several epithets to describe Odysseus, starting with the opening, where he is described as "the man of many devices" (in the 1919 Murray translation). The Greek word used is polytropos, literally the man of many turns, and other translators have suggested alternate English translations, including "man of twists and turns" (Fagles 1996) and "a complicated man" (Wilson 2018).

== Description ==
In the account of Dares the Phrygian, Odysseus was illustrated as "tough, crafty, cheerful, of medium height, eloquent, and wise." In Book III of Homer's Iliad, Priam describes him as "shorter in truth by a head than Atreus' son Agamemnon, / but broader, it would seem, in the chest and across the shoulders /... / Truly, to some deep-fleeced ram would I liken him / who makes his way through the great mass of the shining sheep-flocks." In the same book Antenor recalls that "Menelaus with his broad shoulders was the taller, but Odysseus was the more imposing of the two when they were both seated." In Book VI of the Odyssey, he is described as having "bushy locks" that "hang from his head thick as the petals of a hyacinth in bloom". In Book XVI he is said to have a "bronze tan" and in Book XVIII, it is said that Odysseus "bared his fine massive thighs. His broad shoulders, his chest and brawny arms were now revealed".

== Genealogy ==
Relatively little is given of Odysseus's fictional background other than that according to Pseudo-Apollodorus, his paternal grandfather or step-grandfather is Arcesius, son of Cephalus and grandson of Aeolus, while his maternal grandfather is the thief Autolycus, son of Hermes and Chione; this genealogy places Odysseus as the great-grandson of the Olympian god Hermes. In the Odyssey, however, while Hermes passes on his skill of thievery to Autolycus, there is no indication of a genealogical connection between the two.

According to the Iliad and Odyssey, his father is Laertes and his mother Anticlea, although there was a non-Homeric tradition that Sisyphus was his true father. The rumour went that Laërtes bought Odysseus from the conniving king. Odysseus is said to have a younger sister, Ctimene, who went to Same to be married and is mentioned by the swineherd Eumaeus, whom she grew up alongside, in book 15 of the Odyssey. Odysseus himself, under the guise of an old beggar, gives the swineherd in Ithaca a fictitious genealogy: "From broad Crete I declare that I am come by lineage, the son of a wealthy man. And many other sons too were born and bred in his halls, true sons of a lawful wife; but the mother that bore me was bought, a concubine. Yet Castor, son of Hylax, of whom I declare that I am sprung, honored me even as his true-born sons."

== Mythology ==
=== Before the Trojan War ===
The majority of sources for Odysseus's supposed pre-war exploits—principally the mythographers Pseudo-Apollodorus and Hyginus—postdate Homer by many centuries. Two stories in particular are well known:

When Helen of Troy is abducted, Menelaus calls upon the other suitors to honour their oaths and help him to retrieve her, an attempt that leads to the Trojan War. Odysseus tries to avoid it by feigning lunacy, as an oracle had prophesied a long-delayed return home for him if he went. He hooks a donkey and an ox to his plow (as they have different stride lengths, hindering the efficiency of the plow) and (some modern sources add) starts sowing his fields with salt. Palamedes, at the behest of Menelaus's brother Agamemnon, seeks to disprove Odysseus's madness and places Telemachus, Odysseus's infant son, in front of the plow. Odysseus veers the plow away from his son, thus exposing his stratagem. Odysseus holds a grudge against Palamedes during the war for dragging him away from his home.

Odysseus and other envoys of Agamemnon travel to Scyros to recruit Achilles because of a prophecy that Troy could not be taken without him. By most accounts, Thetis, Achilles's mother, disguises him as a woman to hide him from the recruiters because an oracle had predicted that Achilles would either live a long uneventful life or achieve everlasting glory while dying young. Odysseus cleverly discovers which among the women before him is Achilles, when Achilles is the only one of them to show interest in examining the weapons hidden among an array of adornment gifts for the daughters of their host. Odysseus arranges further for the sounding of a battle horn, which prompts Achilles to clutch a weapon and show his trained disposition. With his disguise foiled, he is exposed and joins Agamemnon's call to arms among the Hellenes.

=== During the Trojan War ===
==== The Iliad ====
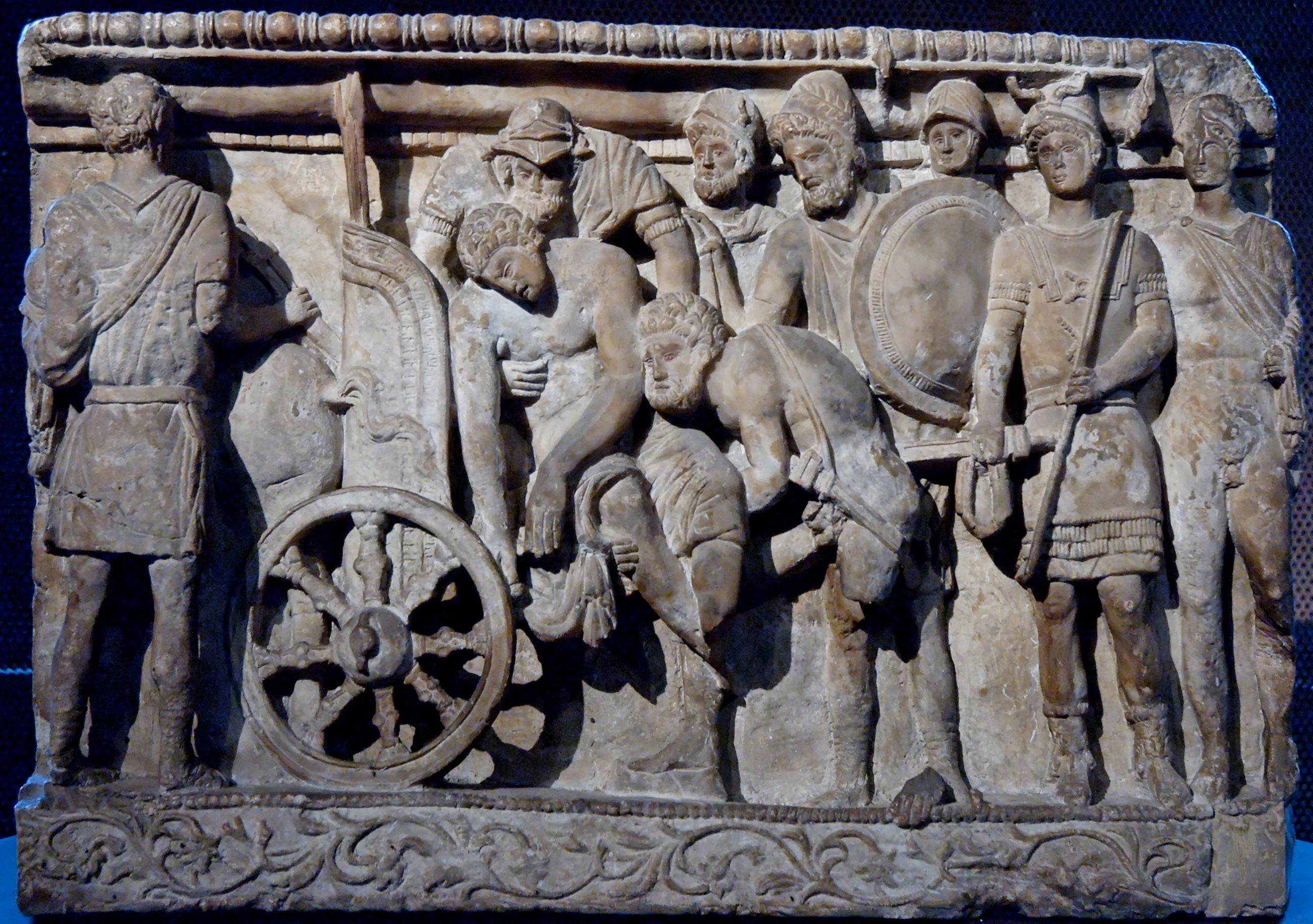
Menelaus and Meriones lifting Patroclus's corpse on a cart while Odysseus looks on, Etruscan alabaster urn from Volterra, Italy, 2nd century BC

Odysseus is represented as one of the most influential Greek champions during the Trojan War in Homer's account. Along with Nestor and Idomeneus he is one of the most trusted counsellors and advisors. He always champions the Achaean cause, especially when others question Agamemnon's command, as in one instance when Thersites speaks against him. When Agamemnon, to test the morale of the Achaeans, announces his intentions to depart Troy, Odysseus restores order to the Greek camp. Later on, after many of the heroes leave the battlefield due to injuries (including Odysseus and Agamemnon), Odysseus once again persuades Agamemnon not to withdraw. Along with two other envoys, he is chosen in the failed embassy to try to persuade Achilles to return to combat.

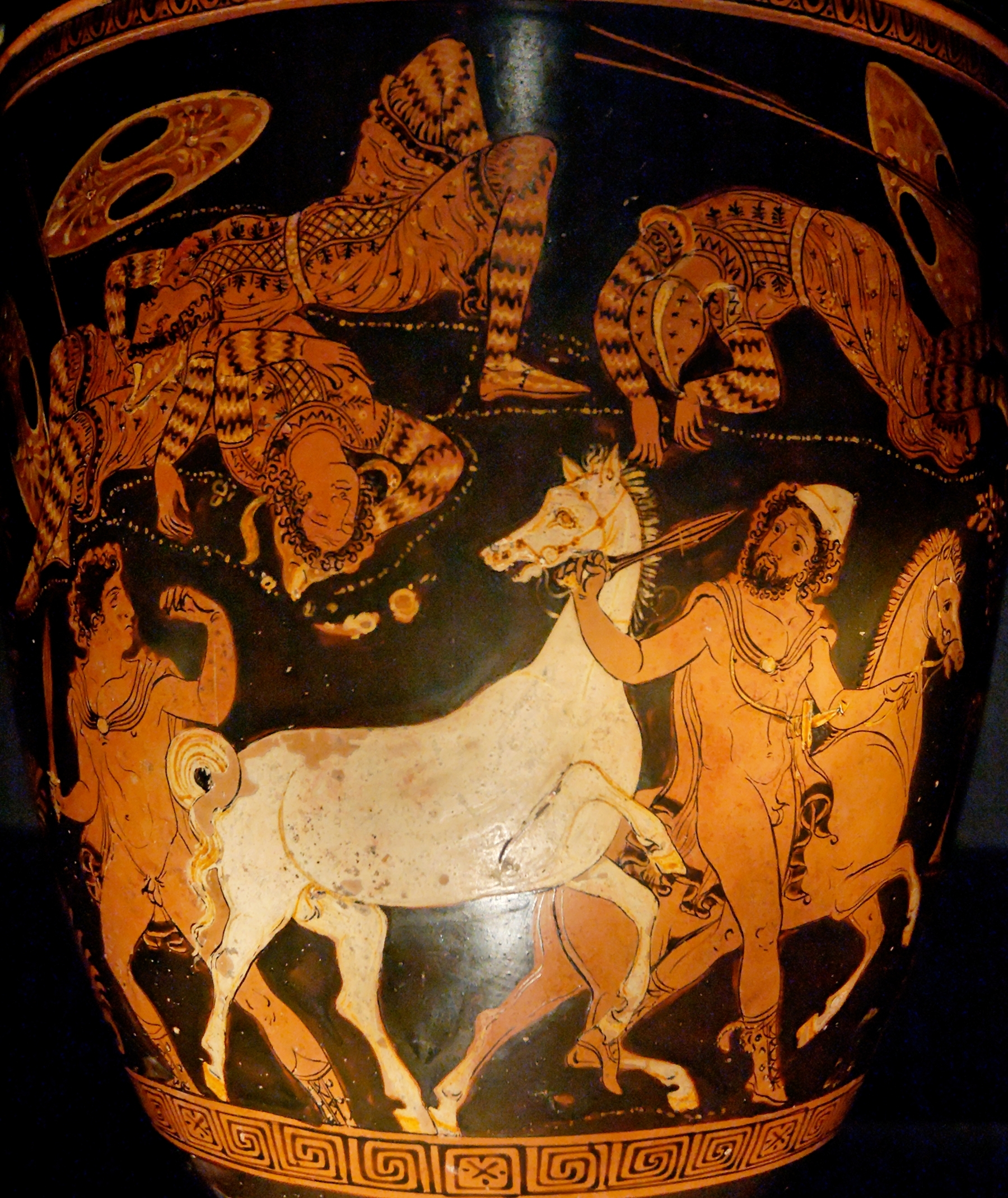
Odysseus and Diomedes stealing the horses of Thracian king Rhesus they have just killed. Apulian red-figure situla, from Ruvo

When Hector proposes a single combat duel, Odysseus is one of the Danaans who reluctantly volunteers to battle him. Telamonian Ajax ("The Greater"), however, is the volunteer who eventually fights Hector. Odysseus aids Diomedes during the night operations to kill Rhesus, because it had been foretold that if his horses drank from the Scamander River, Troy could not be taken.

After Patroclus is slain, it is Odysseus who counsels Achilles to let the Achaean men eat and rest rather than follow his rage-driven desire to go back on the offensive—and kill Trojans—immediately. Eventually (and reluctantly), he consents. During the funeral games for Patroclus, Odysseus becomes involved in a wrestling match with Ajax "The Greater" and foot race with Ajax "The Lesser", son of Oileus and Nestor's son Antilochus. He draws the wrestling match, and with the help of the goddess Athena, he wins the race.

Odysseus has traditionally been viewed as Achilles's antithesis in the Iliad: while Achilles's anger is all-consuming and of a self-destructive nature, Odysseus is frequently viewed as a man of the mean, a voice of reason, renowned for his self-restraint and diplomatic skills. He is also in some respects antithetical to Telamonian Ajax (Shakespeare's "beef-witted" Ajax): while the latter has only brawn to recommend him, Odysseus is not only ingenious, but an eloquent speaker, a skill perhaps best demonstrated in the embassy to Achilles in book 9 of the Iliad. The two are not only foils in the abstract but often opposed in practice since they have many duels and run-ins.

==== Other stories from the Trojan War ====
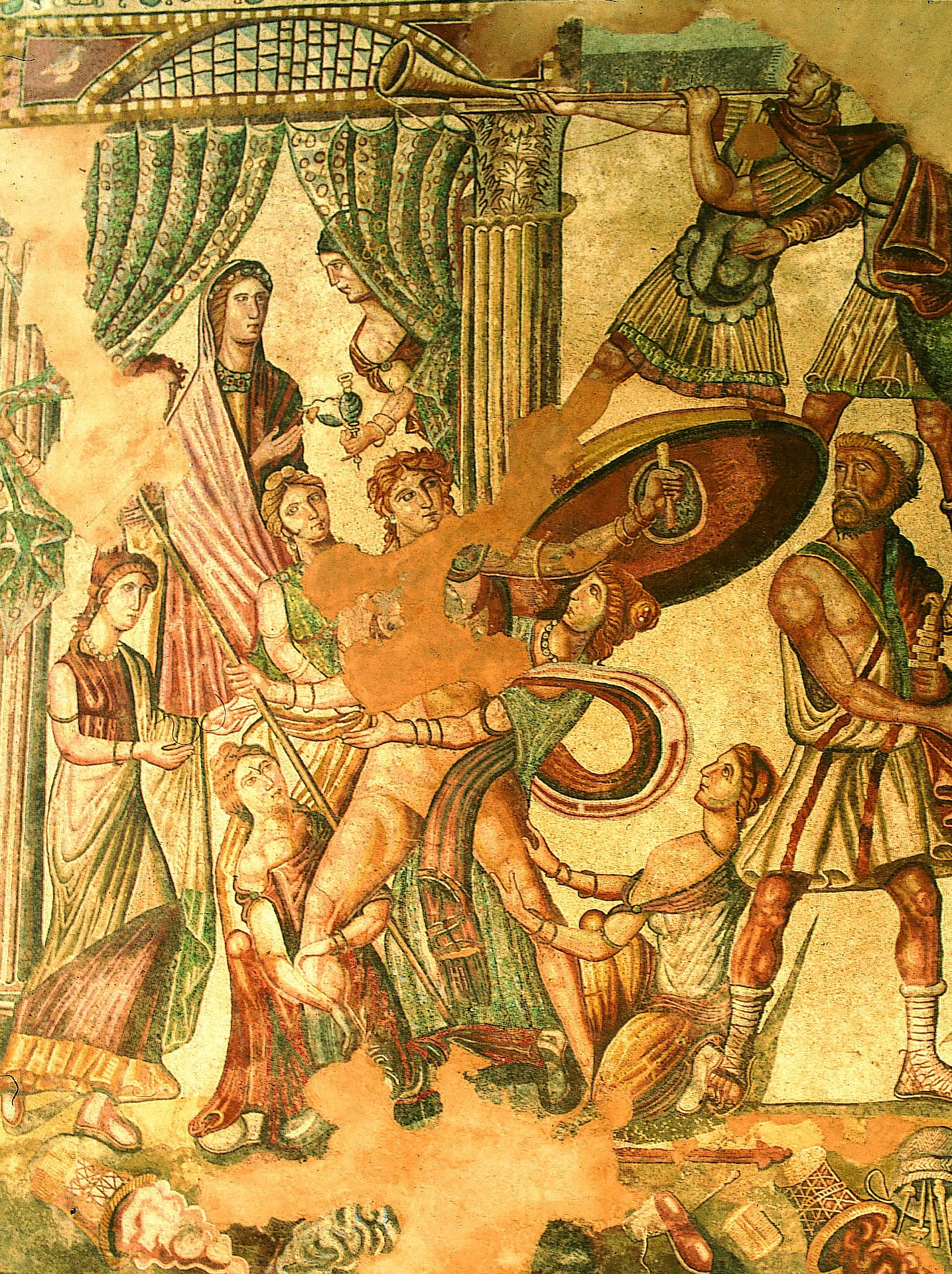
Roman mosaic depicting Odysseus at Skyros unveiling the disguised Achilles; from La Olmeda, Pedrosa de la Vega, Spain, 5th century AD

Since a prophecy suggested that the Trojan War would not be won without Achilles, Odysseus and several other Achaean leaders are described in the Achilleid as having gone to Skyros to find him. Odysseus discovered Achilles by offering gifts, adornments and musical instruments as well as weapons, to the king's daughters, and then having his companions imitate the noises of an enemy's attack on the island (most notably, making a blast of a trumpet heard), which prompted Achilles to reveal himself by picking a weapon to fight back, and together they departed for the Trojan War.

The story of the death of Palamedes has many versions. According to some, Odysseus never forgives Palamedes for unmasking his feigned madness and plays a part in his downfall. One tradition says Odysseus convinces a Trojan captive to write a letter pretending to be from Palamedes. A sum of gold is mentioned to have been sent as a reward for Palamedes's treachery. Odysseus then kills the prisoner and hides the gold in Palamedes's tent. He ensures that the letter is found and acquired by Agamemnon, and also gives hints directing the Argives to the gold. This is evidence enough for the Greeks, and they have Palamedes stoned to death. Other sources say that Odysseus and Diomedes goad Palamedes into descending a well with the prospect of treasure being at the bottom. When Palamedes reaches the bottom, the two proceed to bury him with stones, killing him.

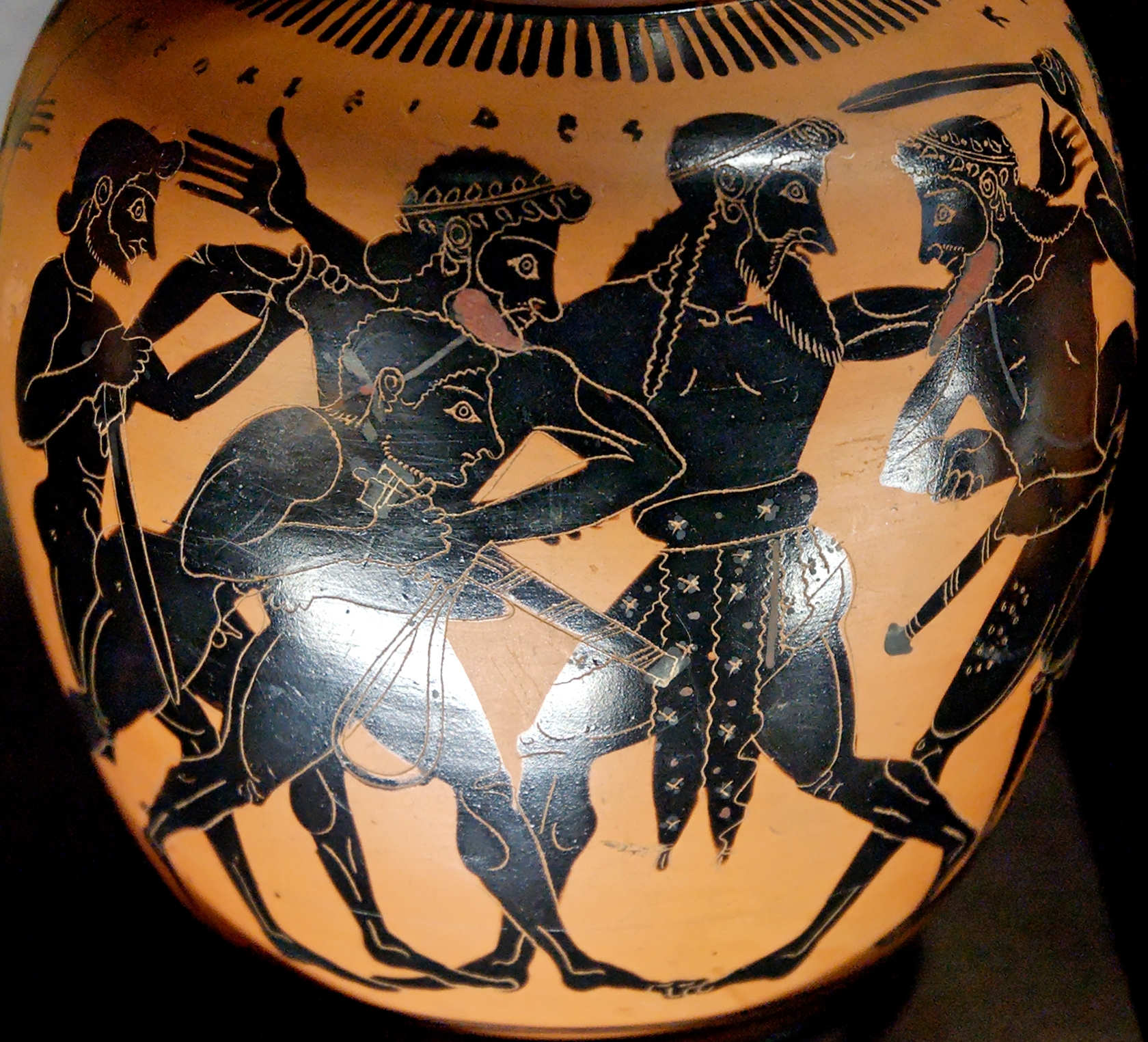
Oinochoe, ca 520 BC, Odysseus and Ajax fighting over the armour of Achilles

When Achilles is slain in battle by Paris, it is Odysseus and Ajax who retrieve the fallen warrior's body and armour in the thick of heavy fighting. During the funeral games for Achilles, Odysseus competes once again with Ajax. Thetis says that the arms of Achilles will go to the bravest of the Greeks, but only these two warriors dare lay claim to that title. The two Argives became embroiled in a heavy dispute about one another's merits to receive the reward. The Greeks dither out of fear in deciding a winner, because they did not want to insult one and have him abandon the war effort. Nestor suggests that they allow the captive Trojans to decide the winner. The accounts of the Odyssey disagree, suggesting that the Greeks themselves hold a secret vote. In any case, Odysseus is the winner. Enraged and humiliated, Ajax is driven mad by Athena. When he returns to his senses, in shame at how he has slaughtered livestock in his madness, Ajax kills himself by the sword that Hector had given him after their duel.

Together with Diomedes, Odysseus fetches Achilles's son, Pyrrhus, to come to the aid of the Achaeans, because an oracle had stated that Troy could not be taken without him. A great warrior, Pyrrhus is also called Neoptolemus (Greek for "new warrior"). Upon the success of the mission, Odysseus gives Achilles's armour to him.

It is learned that the war can not be won without the poisonous arrows of Heracles, which are owned by the abandoned Philoctetes. Odysseus and Diomedes (or, according to some accounts, Odysseus and Neoptolemus) leave to retrieve them. Upon their arrival, Philoctetes (still suffering from the wound) is seen still to be enraged at the Danaans, especially at Odysseus, for abandoning him. Although his first instinct is to shoot Odysseus, his anger is eventually defused by Odysseus's persuasive powers and the influence of the gods. Odysseus returns to the Argive camp with Philoctetes and his arrows.

Perhaps Odysseus's most famous contribution to the Greek war effort is devising the strategy of the Trojan Horse, which allows the Greek army to sneak into Troy under cover of darkness. It is built by Epeius and filled with Greek warriors, led by Odysseus. Odysseus and Diomedes steal the Palladium that lay within Troy's walls, for the Greeks were told they could not sack the city without it. Some late Roman sources indicate that Odysseus schemed to kill his partner on the way back, but Diomedes thwarts this attempt.

Stesichorus attests that Odysseus bore the image of a dolphin on his shield, a tradition likewise preserved by Euphorion. A scholion identifies his war-prize as Laodice, daughter of Cycnus, whom Agamemnon threatened to take when he was forced to return Chryseis in the Iliad.

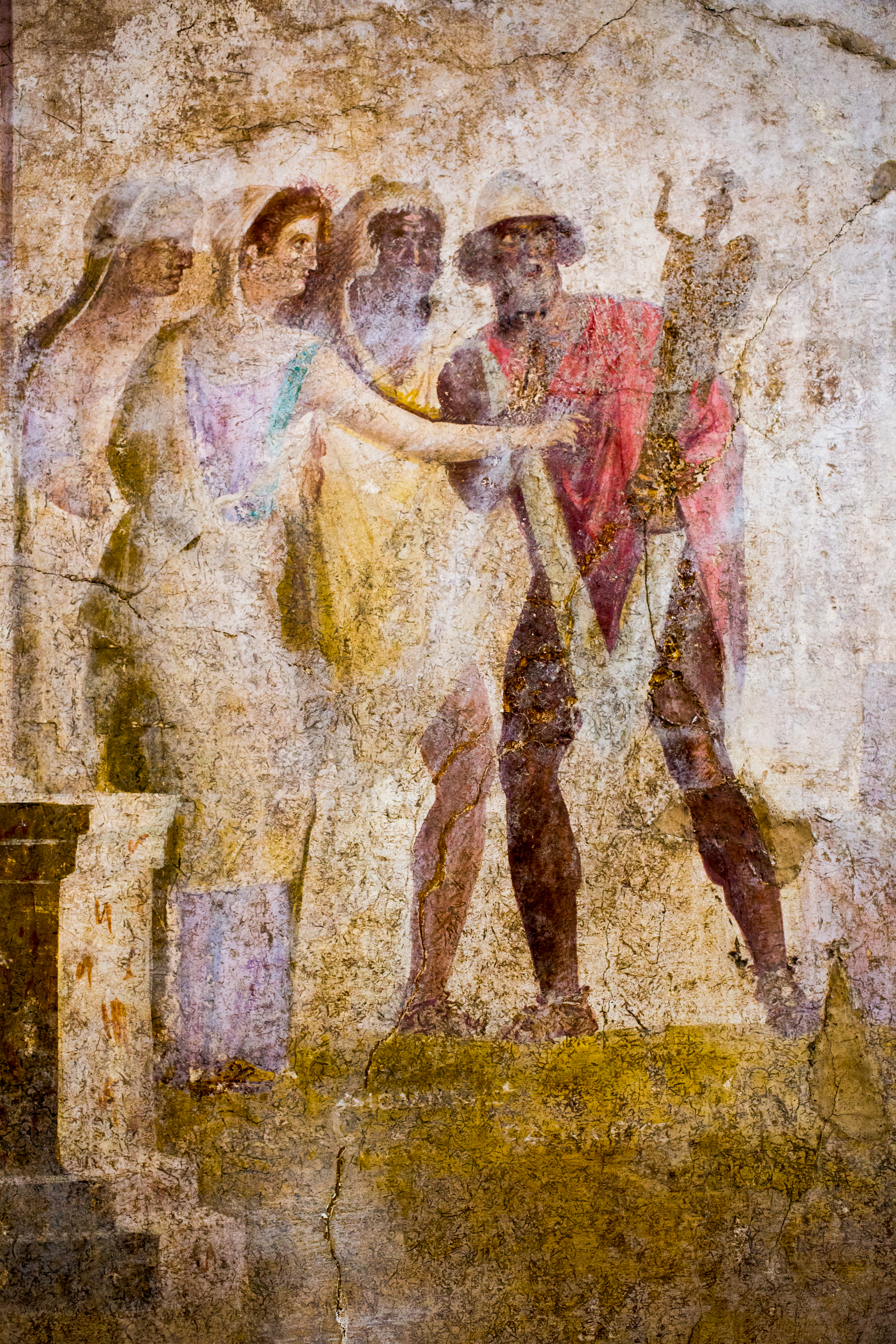
Odysseus (pileus hat) carrying off the palladion from Troy, with the help of Diomedes, against the resistance of Cassandra and other Trojans. Antique fresco from Pompeii.

==== "Cruel, deceitful Ulixes" of the Romans ====
Homer's Iliad and Odyssey portray Odysseus as a culture hero, but the Romans, who believed themselves the heirs of Prince Aeneas of Troy, considered him a villainous falsifier. In Virgil's Aeneid, written between 29 and 19 BC, he is constantly referred to as "cruel Odysseus" (Latin dirus Ulixes) or "deceitful Odysseus" (pellacis, fandi fictor). Turnus, in Aeneid, book 9, reproaches the Trojan Ascanius with images of rugged, forthright Latin virtues, declaring (in John Dryden's translation), "You shall not find the sons of Atreus here, nor need the frauds of sly Ulysses fear." While the Greeks admired his cunning and deceit, these qualities did not recommend themselves to the Romans, who possessed a rigid sense of honour. In Euripides's tragedy Iphigenia at Aulis, having convinced Agamemnon to consent to the sacrifice of his daughter, Iphigenia, to appease the goddess Artemis, Odysseus facilitates the immolation by telling Iphigenia's mother, Clytemnestra, that the girl is to be wed to Achilles. Odysseus's attempts to avoid his sacred oath to defend Menelaus and Helen offended Roman notions of duty, and the many stratagems and tricks that he employed to get his way offended Roman notions of honour.

=== Journey home to Ithaca ===
Odysseus is best known as the eponymous hero of the Odyssey. This epic describes his travels, which lasted for 10 years, as he tries to return home after the Trojan War and reassert his place as rightful king of Ithaca.

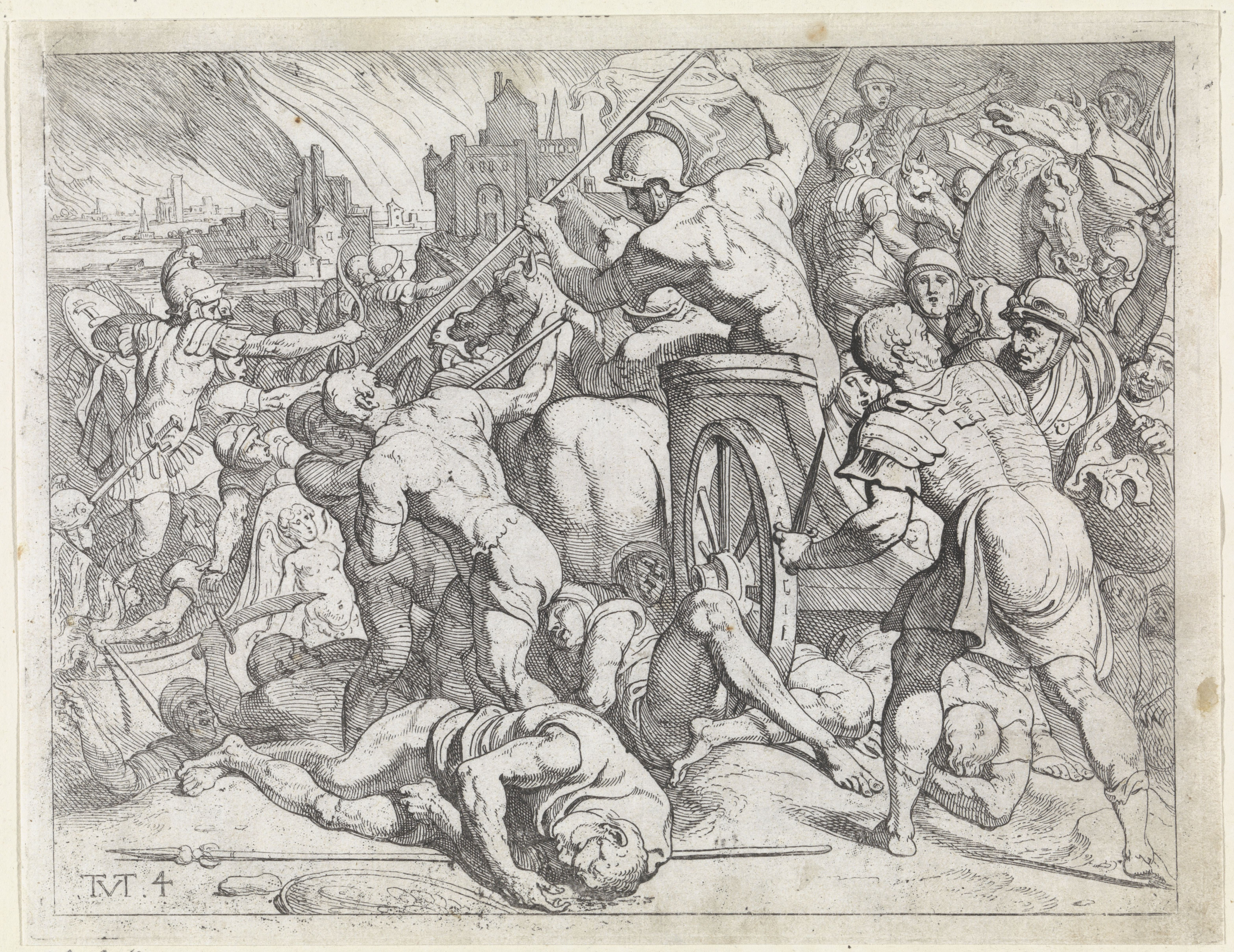
Odysseus and his men fighting the Cicones —allies of the Trojans— during the sacking of their city. After seizing goods and women, Odysseus is driven back by allies of the Cicones.

Homebound from Troy, he and his twelve ships begin with a raid launched against Ismarus in the land of the Cicones, allies of the Trojans. After taking the city by surprise, Odysseus and his men engage in looting and slaughtering the warriors. Their spoils consist of goods, livestock, and women. Only Maron, the priest of Apollo, and his family are spared by Odysseus. In gratitude, he is gifted a barrel of wine. In no rush to leave that same evening, Odysseus's men are attacked by the Cicones, who had gone to seek help from neighbors. After losing six of his men, Odysseus is forced to flee in haste.

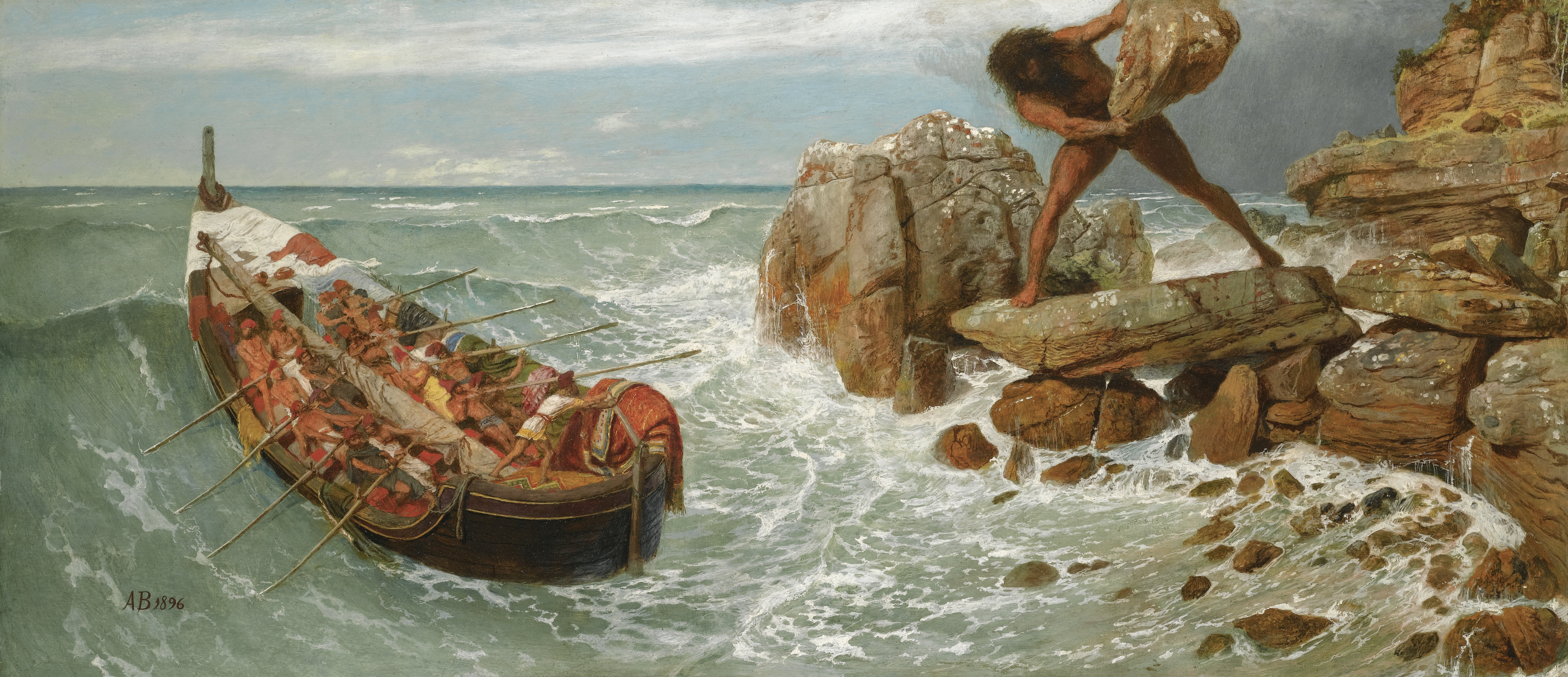
Odysseus and Polyphemus (1896) by Arnold Böcklin: Odysseus and his crew escape the Cyclops Polyphemus.

Driven off course by storms during three days, they visit the lethargic Lotus-Eaters and are captured by the Cyclops Polyphemus while visiting his island. After Polyphemus eats several of his men, he and Odysseus have a discussion and Odysseus tells Polyphemus his name is Outis ("Nobody"). Odysseus takes the Maron's barrel of wine and the Cyclops drinks it, falling asleep. Odysseus and his men take a wooden stake, ignite it with the remaining wine, and blind him. While they escape, Polyphemus cries in pain, and the other Cyclopes ask him what is wrong. Polyphemus cries, "Nobody has blinded me!" and the other Cyclopes think he has gone mad. Odysseus and his crew escape, but Odysseus rashly reveals his real name, and Polyphemus prays to Poseidon, his father, to take revenge. They stay with Aeolus, the master of the winds, who gives Odysseus a leather bag containing all the winds, except the west wind, a gift that should have ensured a safe return home. However, the sailors foolishly open the bag while Odysseus sleeps, thinking that it contains gold. All of the winds fly out, and the resulting storm drives the ships back the way they had come, just as Ithaca comes into sight.

After pleading in vain with Aeolus to help them again, they re-embark and encounter the cannibalistic Laestrygonians. Odysseus's ship is the only one to escape. He sails on and visits the witch-goddess Circe. She turns half of his men into swine after feeding them cheese and wine. Hermes warns Odysseus about Circe and gives him a drug called moly, which resists Circe's magic. Circe, being attracted to Odysseus's resistance, falls in love with him and releases his men. Odysseus and his crew remain with her on the island for one year, while they feast and drink. Finally, Odysseus's men convince him to leave for Ithaca.

Guided by Circe's instructions, Odysseus and his crew cross the ocean and reach a harbor at the western edge of the world, where Odysseus sacrifices to the dead and summons the spirit of the old prophet Tiresias for advice. Next Odysseus meets the spirit of his own mother, who had died of grief during his long absence. From her, he learns for the first time news of his own household, threatened by the greed of Penelope's suitors. Odysseus also talks to his fallen war comrades and the mortal shade of Heracles.

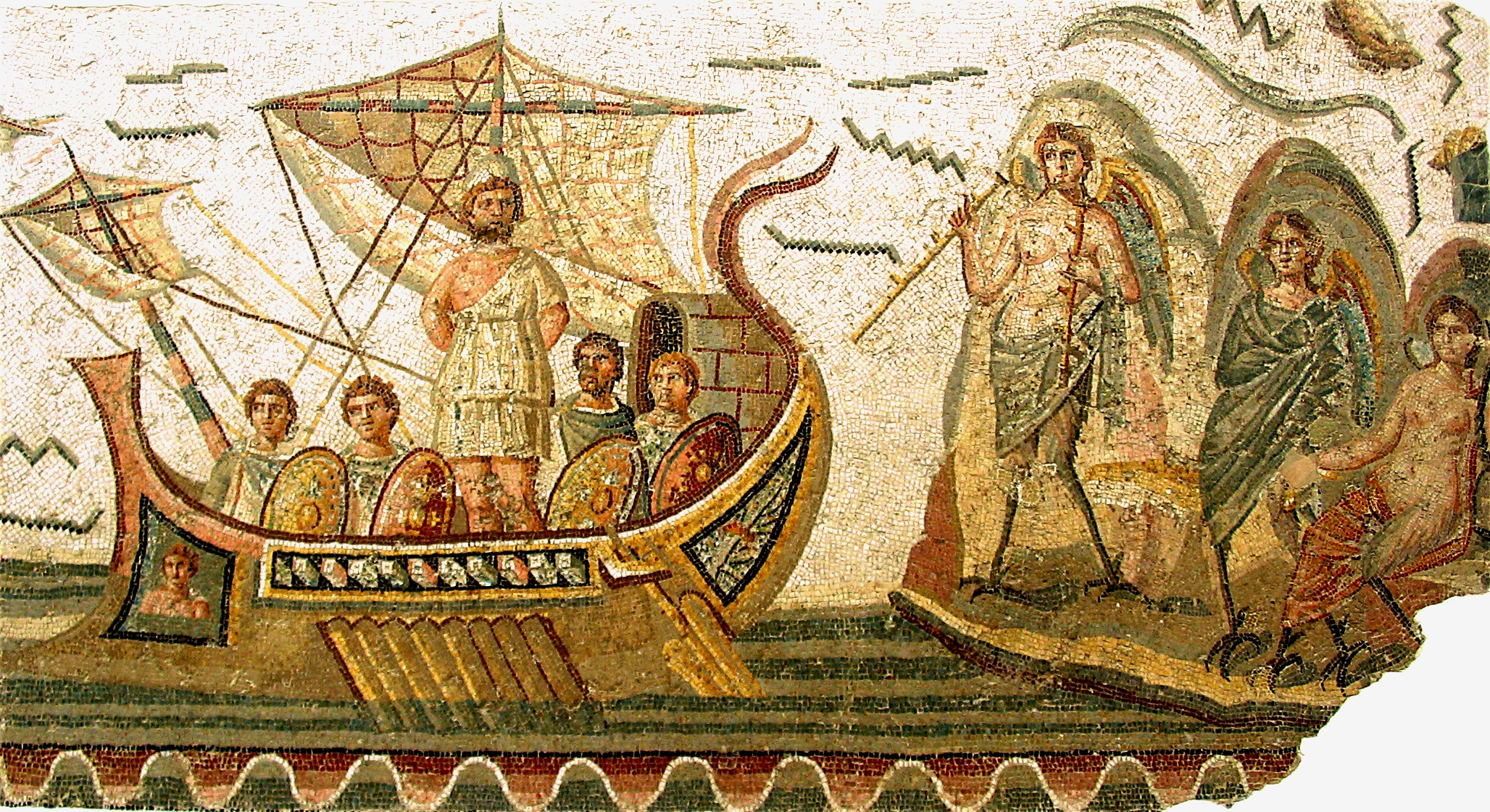
Odysseus and the Sirens, Ulixes mosaic at the Bardo National Museum in Tunis, Tunisia, 2nd century AD

Odysseus and his men return to Circe's island, and she advises them on the remaining stages of the journey. They skirt the land of the Sirens, pass between the six-headed monster Scylla and the whirlpool Charybdis, where they row directly between the two. However, Scylla drags the boat towards her by grabbing the oars and eats six men.

They land on the island of Thrinacia. There, Odysseus's men ignore the warnings of Tiresias and Circe and hunt down the sacred cattle of the sun god Helios. Helios tells Zeus what happened and demands Odysseus's men be punished or else he will take the sun and shine it in the underworld. Zeus fulfills Helios's demands by causing a shipwreck during a thunderstorm in which all but Odysseus drown. He washes ashore on the island of Ogygia, where Calypso compels him to remain as her lover for seven years. He finally escapes when Hermes tells Calypso to release Odysseus.

Odysseus is shipwrecked and befriended by the Phaeacians. After he tells them his story, the Phaeacians, led by King Alcinous, agree to help Odysseus get home. They deliver him at night, while he is fast asleep, to a hidden harbor on Ithaca. He finds his way to the hut of one of his own former slaves, the swineherd Eumaeus, and also meets up with his son Telemachus returning from Sparta. Athena disguises Odysseus as a wandering beggar to learn how things stand in his household.

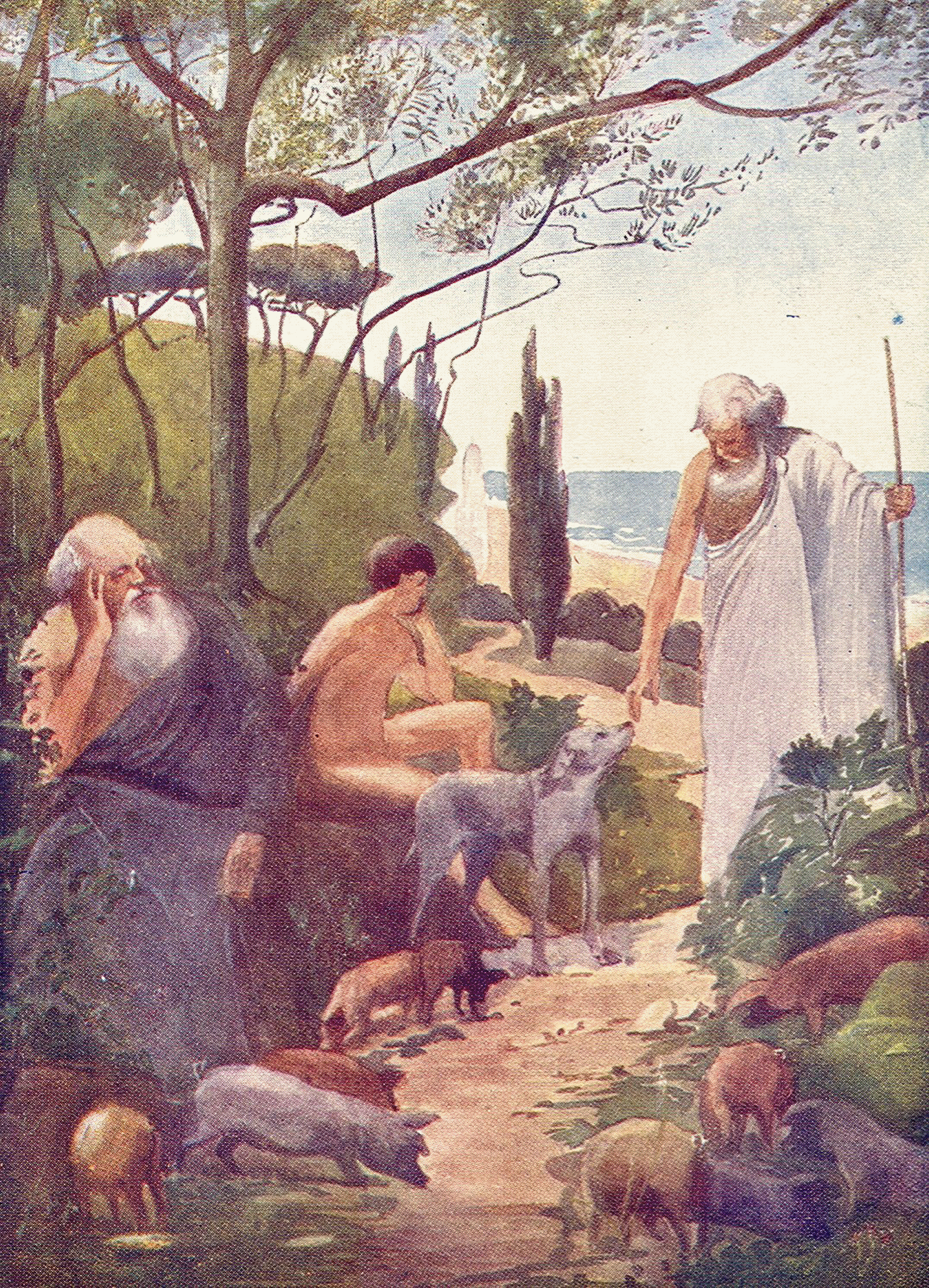
The return of Ulysses, illustration by E. M. Synge from the 1909 Story of the World children's book series (book 1: On the shores of Great Sea)

When the disguised Odysseus returns after 20 years, he is recognized only by his faithful dog, Argos. Penelope announces in her long interview with the disguised hero that whoever can string Odysseus's rigid bow and shoot an arrow through twelve axe shafts may have her hand. According to Bernard Knox, "For the plot of the Odyssey, of course, her decision is the turning point, the move that makes possible the long-predicted triumph of the returning hero". Odysseus's identity is discovered by the housekeeper, Eurycleia, as she is washing his feet and discovers an old scar Odysseus received during a boar hunt. Odysseus swears her to secrecy, threatening to kill her if she tells anyone.

When the contest of the bow begins, none of the suitors are able to string the bow. After all the suitors have given up, the disguised Odysseus asks to participate. Though the suitors refuse at first, Penelope intervenes and allows the "stranger" (the disguised Odysseus) to participate. Odysseus easily strings his bow and wins the contest. Having done so, he proceeds to slaughter the suitors (beginning with Antinous whom he finds drinking from Odysseus's cup) with help from Telemachus and two of Odysseus's servants, Eumaeus the swineherd and Philoetius the cowherd. Odysseus tells the serving women who slept with the suitors to clean up the mess of corpses and then has those women hanged in terror. He tells Telemachus that he will replenish his stocks by raiding nearby islands. Odysseus has now revealed himself in all his glory (enhanced by Athena); yet Penelope cannot believe that her husband has really returned—she fears that it is perhaps some god in disguise, as in the story of Alcmene (mother of Heracles)—and tests him by ordering her servant Euryclea to move the bed in their wedding-chamber. Odysseus protests that this cannot be done since he made the bed himself and knows that one of its legs is a living olive tree. Penelope finally accepts that he truly is her husband, a moment that highlights their homophrosýnē ("like-mindedness").

The next day Odysseus and Telemachus visit the country farm of his old father Laërtes. The citizens of Ithaca follow Odysseus on the road, planning to avenge the killing of the Suitors, their sons. The goddess Athena and the god Zeus intervene and persuade both sides to make peace.

=== Other tales ===
According to some late sources, most of them purely genealogical, Odysseus had many other children besides Telemachus. Most such genealogies aimed to link Odysseus with the foundation of many Italic cities. This would seem to contradict the Odyssey, which says that Odysseus's family line can only produce a single child per generation by the order of Zeus, with Telemachus already existing as that sole heir. However, the Odyssey also notes the existence of Odysseus's sister, Ctimene.

The most famous of the other children are:

- with Penelope: Poliporthes and Arcesilaus
- with Circe: Telegonus, Ardeas, Latinus, also Auson and Cassiphone. Xenagoras writes that Odysseus with Circe had three sons, Romos (Ancient Greek: Ῥώμος), Anteias (Ancient Greek: Ἀντείας) and Ardeias (Ancient Greek: Ἀρδείας), who built three cities and called them after their own names: Rome, Antium, and Ardea, respectively.
- with Calypso: Nausithous, Nausinous
- with Callidice: Polypoetes
- with Euippe: Euryalus
- with daughter of Thoas: Leontophonus

He figures in the end of the story of King Telephus of Mysia.

The last poem in the Epic Cycle is called the Telegony, and is now lost. According to remaining fragments, it told the story of Odysseus's last voyage to the land of the Thesprotians. There he married the queen Callidice. Then he led the Thesprotians in a war with their neighbors the Brygoi (Brygi, Brygians) and defeated in battle the neighboring peoples who attacked him. When Callidice died, Odysseus returned home to Ithaca, leaving their son, Polypoetes, to rule Thesprotia. Contradicting the reading of Tiresias's prophecy in the Odyssey that Odysseus will have a gentle death in old age after making it home, the Telogony claims that he met his death at the hands of Telegonus, his son with Circe, after a misunderstanding. Telegonus attacked his father with a poisoned, stingray spine-tipped spear, given to him by Circe. Before dying, Odysseus recognized his son. Telegonus then brought back his father's corpse to Aeaea, together with Penelope and Odysseus's son by her, Telemachus. After burying Odysseus, Circe made the other three immortal. Circe married Telemachus, and Telegonus married Penelope by the advice of Athena. An alternative version to Odysseus' death by stingray spine was presented in the Ghost-Raisers, a lost fifth-century BC tragedy by Aeschylus inspired by the nekyia episode of the Odyssey. In the tragedy, the dead Tiresias predicted that one day a heron's droppings containing said barb would fall upon an aged Odysseus' bald head and rot his skin.

According to what seems to be later tradition, Odysseus was resurrected by Circe after his death at the hands of Telegonus. Afterward, he married Telemachus to Cassiphone, the daughter he had with Circe. Telemachus however killed Circe after a quarrel, causing Cassiphone to kill him in revenge. Odysseus witnessing those unfortunate events died again, of grief this time.

In 5th century BC Athens, tales of the Trojan War were popular subjects for tragedies. Odysseus figures centrally or indirectly in a number of the extant plays by Aeschylus, Sophocles (Ajax, Philoctetes) and Euripides (Hecuba, Rhesus, Cyclops) and figured in still more that have not survived. In his Ajax, Sophocles portrays Odysseus as a modern voice of reasoning compared to the title character's rigid antiquity.

Plato in his dialogue Hippias Minor examines a literary question about whom Homer intended to portray as the better man, Achilles or Odysseus.

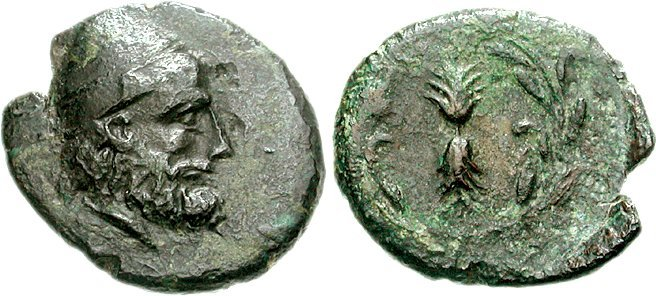
Head of Odysseus wearing a pileus depicted on a 3rd-century BC coin from Ithaca

Pausanias in the Description of Greece writes that at Pheneus there was a bronze statue of Poseidon, surnamed Hippios (Ancient Greek: Ἵππιος), meaning of horse, which according to the legends was dedicated by Odysseus and also a sanctuary of Artemis which was called Heurippa (Ancient Greek: Εὑρίππα), meaning horse finder, and was founded by Odysseus. According to the legends Odysseus lost his mares and traversed Greece in search of them. He found them on that site in Pheneus. Pausanias adds that according to the people of Pheneus, when Odysseus found his mares he decided to keep horses in the land of Pheneus, just as he reared his cows. The people of Pheneus also pointed out to him writing, purporting to be instructions of Odysseus to those tending his mares.

As Ulysses, he is mentioned regularly in Virgil's Aeneid written between 29 and 19 BC, and the poem's hero, Aeneas, rescues one of Ulysses's crew members who was left behind on the island of the Cyclopes. He in turn offers a first-person account of some of the same events Homer relates, in which Ulysses appears directly. Virgil's Ulysses typifies his view of the Greeks: he is cunning but impious, and ultimately malicious and hedonistic.

Ovid retells parts of Ulysses's journeys, focusing on his romantic involvements with Circe and Calypso, and recasts him as, in Harold Bloom's phrase, "one of the great wandering womanizers". Ovid also gives a detailed account of the contest between Ulysses and Ajax for the armour of Achilles.

Telephus of Pergamum was the author of On the Wanderings of Odysseus (Περὶ τῆς Ὀδυσσέως πλάνης), a lost work known only from later references.

Greek legend tells of Ulysses as the founder of Lisbon, Portugal, calling it Ulisipo or Ulisseya, during his twenty-year errand on the Mediterranean and Atlantic seas. Olisipo was Lisbon's name in the Roman Empire. This folk etymology is recounted by Strabo based on Asclepiades of Myrlea's words, by Pomponius Mela, by Gaius Julius Solinus (3rd century AD), and would later be reiterated by Camões in his epic poem Os Lusíadas (first printed in 1572).

In one version of Odysseus's end, he is eventually turned into a horse by Athena.

In the Greek Questions by Plutarch, it is mentioned that Neoptolemus was summoned by both the relatives of the slain suitors and Odysseus' side to serve as an arbiter after the slaughter of the suitors. He judged that Odysseus should leave Ithaca and be exiled from Cephallenia, Zacynthus and Ithaca because of the killings, while the companions and relatives of the suitors should provide yearly compensation to Odysseus for the losses they had caused to his estate. Odysseus then transferred his right to receive this compensation to his son Telemachus and departed for Italy to live in exile.

According to Istros the Callimachean, Anticlea gave birth to Odysseus near Alalcomenae in Boeotia; consequently, Odysseus named an Ithacan town Alalcomenae in commemoration of his birthplace.

==== Image of Aidos ====
When Penelope married Odysseus, her father, Icarius, wished the couple to remain in Sparta rather than leave for Ithaca. He tried to persuade Odysseus to settle there, but when he failed, he turned to his daughter and begged her to stay with him.

As Penelope and Odysseus departed in their chariot for Ithaca, Icarius followed them along the road, pleading with Penelope not to leave him.

Odysseus put up with this for some time, but eventually told Penelope that she must choose, either accompany him willingly to Ithaca or return to Sparta and remain with her father.

Penelope did not answer him with words. Instead, she silently covered her face with her veil.

Icarius understood from this gesture that his daughter wished to leave with her husband. He therefore allowed her to depart.

At the place where Penelope had covered her face, Icarius dedicated an image of Aidos, the personification of Modesty. Pausanias locates the statue approximately thirty stades from Sparta, along the road, and records the tradition explaining its dedication.

== In post-classical tradition ==
Odysseus is one of the most recurrent characters in Western culture.

=== Middle Ages and Renaissance ===
Dante Alighieri, in the Canto XXVI of the Inferno segment of his Divine Comedy (1308–1320), encounters Odysseus ("Ulisse" in Italian) near the very bottom of Hell: with Diomedes, he walks wrapped in flame in the eighth ring (Counselors of Fraud) of the Eighth Circle (Sins of Malice), as punishment for his schemes and conspiracies that won the Trojan War. In a famous passage, Dante has Odysseus relate a different version of his voyage and death from the one told by Homer. He tells how he set out with his men from Circe's island for a journey of exploration to sail beyond the Pillars of Hercules and into the Western sea to find what adventures awaited them. Men, says Ulisse, are not made to live like brutes, but to follow virtue and knowledge.

After travelling west and south for five months, they see in the distance a great mountain rising from the sea (this is Purgatory, in Dante's cosmology) before a storm sinks them. Dante did not have access to the original Greek texts of the Homeric epics, so his knowledge of their subject-matter was based only on information from later sources, chiefly Virgil's Aeneid but also Ovid; hence the discrepancy between Dante and Homer.

He appears in Shakespeare's Troilus and Cressida (1602), set during the Trojan War.

=== Modern literature ===
==== Poetry ====
In her poem Site of the Castle of Ulysses. (published in 1836), Letitia Elizabeth Landon gives her version of The Song of the Sirens with an explanation of its purpose, structure and meaning. This illustrates a painting by Charles Bentley engraved by R. Sands, and showing The Black Mountains of Cephalonia in the background. A further poetical illustration, also in Fisher's Drawing Room Scrap Book, 1837, is to an engraving of a painting by Charles Bentley, Town and Harbour of Ithaca. and harks back to the island 'where Ulysses was king'.

Alfred, Lord Tennyson's poem "Ulysses" (published in 1842) presents an aging king who has seen too much of the world to be happy sitting on a throne idling his days away. Leaving the task of civilizing his people to his son, he gathers together a band of old comrades "to sail beyond the sunset".

Nikos Kazantzakis's The Odyssey: A Modern Sequel (1938), a 33,333-line epic poem, begins with Odysseus cleansing his body of the blood of Penelope's suitors. Odysseus soon leaves Ithaca in search of new adventures. Before his death he abducts Helen, incites revolutions in Crete and Egypt, communes with God, and meets representatives of such famous historical and literary figures as Lenin, Don Quixote and Jesus.

In 1986, Irish poet Eilean Ni Chuilleanain published "The Second Voyage", a poem in which she makes use of the story of Odysseus.

The poet and dramatist Stephen Phillips (1864–1915) wrote "Ulysses", a drama in a prologue and three acts.

==== Novels ====
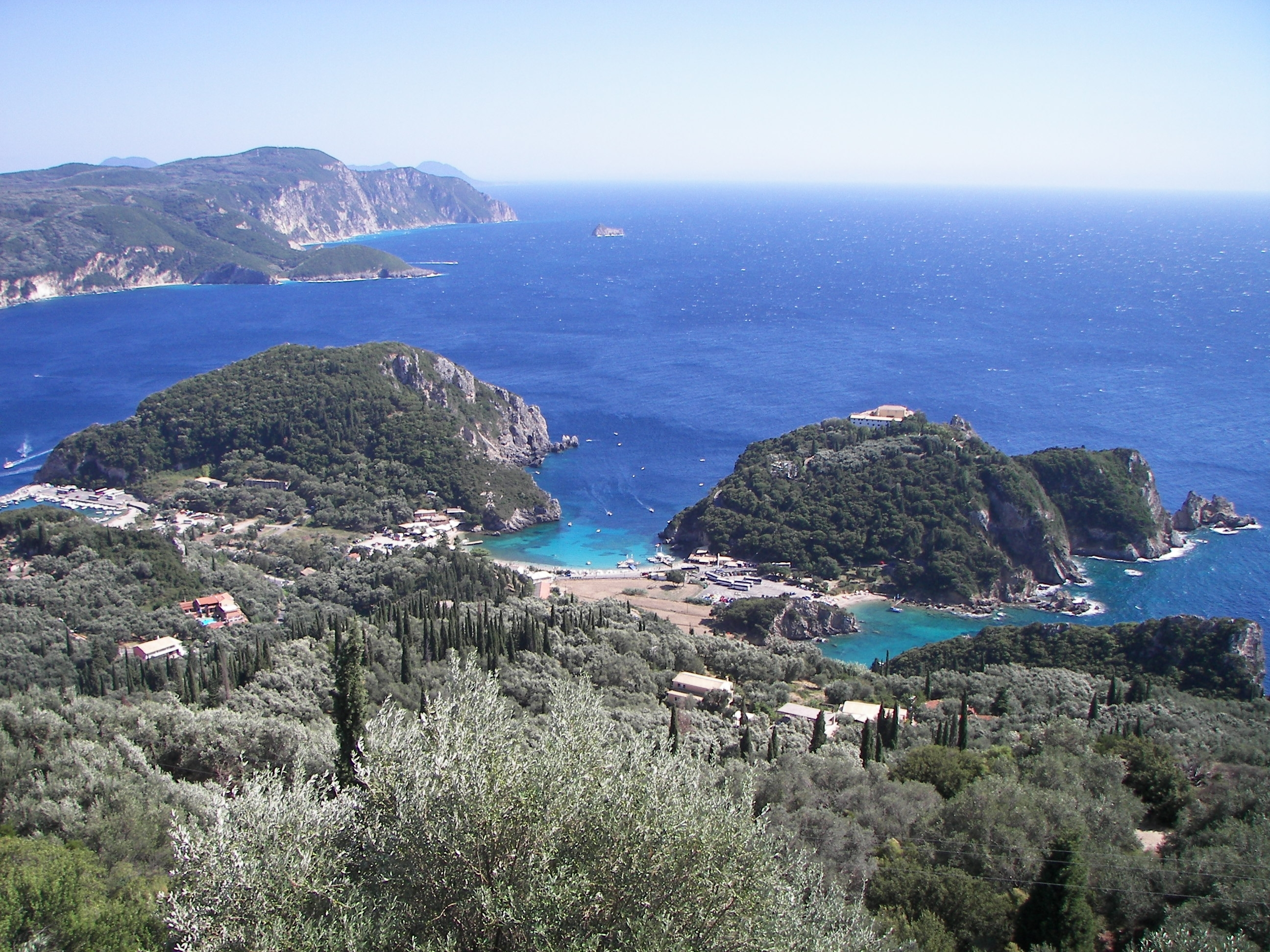
The bay of Palaiokastritsa in Corfu as seen from Bella Vista of Lakones, considered to be the place where Odysseus disembarked and met Nausicaa for the first time. The rock in the sea near the horizon at the top centre-left is held by the locals to be the mythical petrified ship of Odysseus.

Frederick Rolfe's The Weird of the Wanderer (1912) has the hero Nicholas Crabbe (based on the author) travelling back in time, discovering that he is the reincarnation of Odysseus, marrying Helen, being deified and ending up as one of the three Magi.

James Joyce's novel Ulysses (first published 1918–1920) uses modern literary devices to narrate a single day in the life of a Dublin businessman named Leopold Bloom. Bloom's day bears many elaborate parallels to Odysseus's ten years of wandering.

Return to Ithaca (1946) by Eyvind Johnson is a retelling of the events that adds a psychological study of the characters of Odysseus, Penelope and Telemachus. Thematically, it uses Odysseus's backstory and struggle as a metaphor for dealing with the aftermath of war (the novel being written immediately after the end of the Second World War).

In the eleventh chapter of Primo Levi's 1947 memoir If This Is a Man, "The Canto of Ulysses", the author describes the last voyage of Ulysses as told by Dante in The Inferno to a fellow-prisoner during forced labour in the Nazi concentration camp Auschwitz.

Odysseus is the hero of The Luck of Troy (1961) by Roger Lancelyn Green, whose title refers to the theft of the Palladium.

In S. M. Stirling's Against the Tide of Years (1998) and On the Oceans of Eternity, the second and third parts to his Nantucket series of alternate history novels, Odikweos ("Odysseus" in Mycenaean Greek) is a "historical" figure who is every bit as cunning as his legendary self and is one of the few Bronze Age inhabitants who discerns the time-travellers' real background. Odikweos first aids William Walker's rise to power in Achaea and later helps bring Walker down after seeing his homeland turn into a police state.

The Penelopiad (2005) by Margaret Atwood retells his story from the point of view of his wife Penelope.

Rick Riordan's novel series Percy Jackson & the Olympians, which centres on the presence of Greek mythology in the 21st century, incorporates several elements from Odysseus's story. The second novel in particular, The Sea of Monsters (2006), is a loose adaptation of the Odyssey, with protagonists Percy and Annabeth seeking to save their satyr friend Grover from Polyphemus, and facing many of the same obstacles Odysseus faced over the course of the journey.

Volodymyr Yermolenko, Ukrainian philosopher and essayist, wrote Ocean Catcher: The Story of Odysseus, Stary Lev, 2017, which is loose adaptation of the Odyssey, where after coming back home to Ithaca, where he cannot find either Penelope or Telemachus, he decides to have a reverse trip to Troy.

==== Short Stories ====
The Swiss author Robert Walser wrote a literary sketch or feuilleton about Odysseus, which was published in German in 1920 in Das Tage-Buch and later included in the English-translation collection Speaking to the Rose (2005).

Franz Kafka wrote a short piece about Odysseus titled "The Silence of the Sirens", published posthumously in 1931.

==== Literary criticism ====
The literary theorist Núria Perpinyà conceived twenty different interpretations of the Odyssey in a 2008 study.

=== Television and film ===
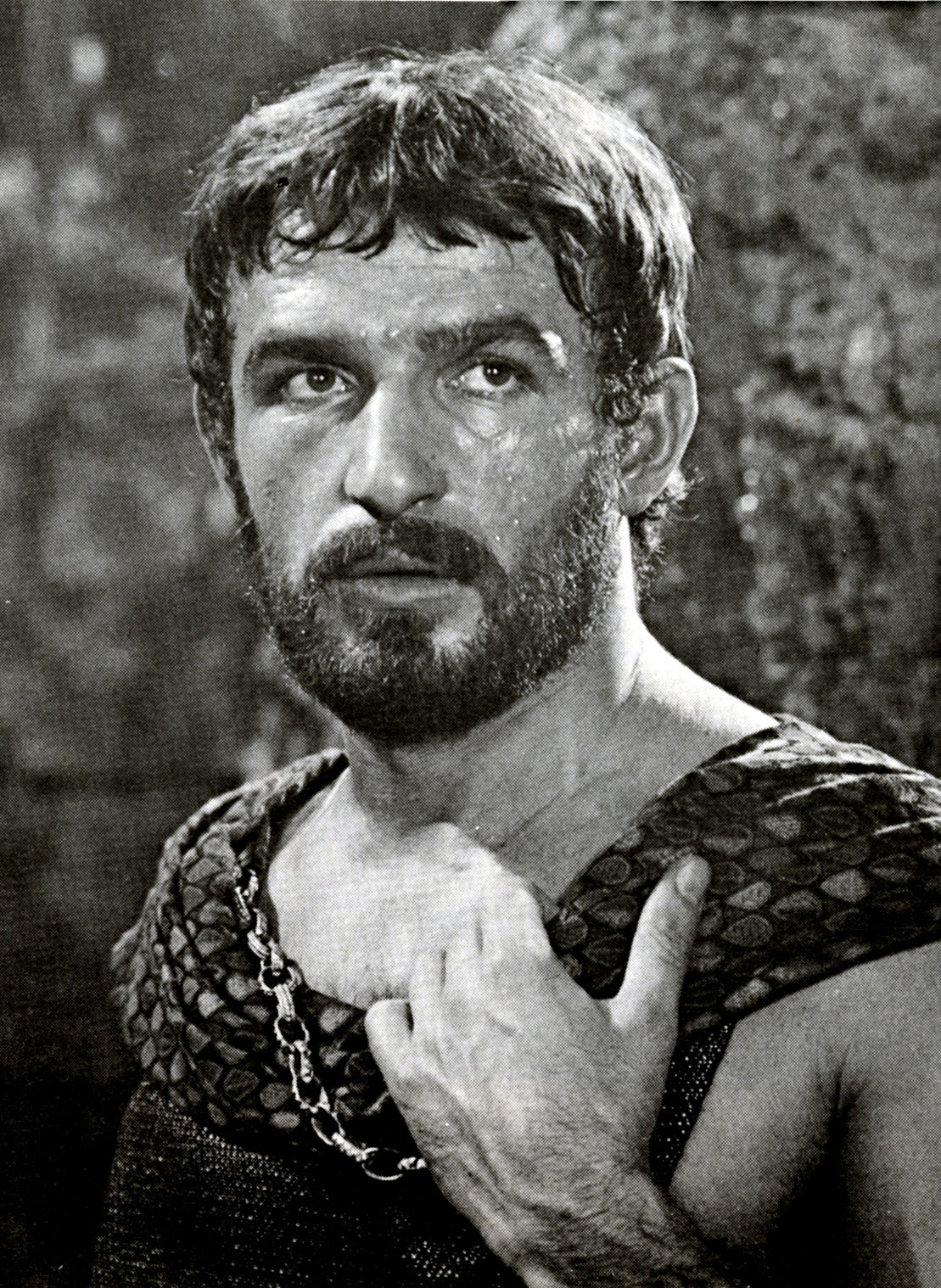
Bekim Fehmiu as Odysseus in Odissea (dal Poema di Omero)

The actors who have portrayed Odysseus in feature films include Tom O'Brien in The Private Life of Helen of Troy (1927), Kirk Douglas in the Italian Ulysses (1955), Torin Thatcher in Helen of Troy (1956), John Drew Barrymore in The Trojan Horse (1961), Piero Lulli in The Fury of Achilles (1962), Luigi Mezzanotte in Nostos: The Return (1989) (Note: The character is not named in the film. Director Franco Piavoli has referred to him as both Odysseus (Italian: Ulisse) and Nostos.) Sean Bean in Troy (2004), Ralph Fiennes in The Return (2024), and Matt Damon in The Odyssey (2026).

In television series, he has been played by Bekim Fehmiu in Odissea (dal Poema di Omero) (1968), Armand Assante in The Odyssey (1997), Nigel Whitmey in Helen of Troy (2003), and by Joseph Mawle in Troy: Fall of a City (2018).

Ulysses 31 is a French-Japanese animated television series (1981) that updates the Greek mythology of Odysseus to the 31st century. George Clooney plays Ulysses Everett McGill, a character based on Odysseus, in O Brother, Where Art Thou? (2000).

=== Music ===
The opera Ulysse ou le beau périple (1961) by Henri Tomasi.

The British group Cream recorded the song "Tales of Brave Ulysses" in 1967.

English composer David Bedford's 1976 album The Odyssey was a musical setting of the story.

Suzanne Vega's song "Calypso" from 1987 album Solitude Standing shows Odysseus from Calypso's point of view, and tells the tale of him coming to the island and his leaving.

The American progressive metal band Symphony X released a 24-minute adaptation of the tale on their 2002 album The Odyssey.

Odysseus is featured in a verse of the song "Journey of the Magi" on Frank Turner's 2009 album Poetry of the Deed.

Rolf Riehm composed an opera based on the myth, Sirenen – Bilder des Begehrens und des Vernichtens (Sirens – Images of Desire and Destruction) which premiered at the Oper Frankfurt in 2014.

Odysseus appears as the main character of Epic: The Musical, a sung-through adaptation of the Odyssey created by musician Jorge Rivera-Herrans. Rivera-Herrans provides the voice of Odysseus.

=== Comparative mythology and folkloristics ===
Over time, comparisons between Odysseus and other heroes of different mythologies and religions have been made. A similar story exists in Hindu mythology with Nala and Damayanti where Nala separates from Damayanti and is reunited with her. The story of stringing a bow is similar to the description in the Ramayana of Rama stringing the bow to win Sita's hand in marriage.

Virgil's Aeneid has evident similarities to the Odyssey. Virgil tells the story of Aeneas and his travels to what would become Rome. On his journey, he endures strife comparable to that of Odysseus. However, the motives for both of their journeys differ, as Aeneas was driven by this sense of duty granted to him by the gods that he must abide by. He keeps in mind the future of his people, fitting for the future Father of Rome.

In folkloristics, the story of Odysseus's journey back to his native Ithaca and wife Penelope corresponds to the tale type ATU 974, "The Homecoming Husband", of the international Aarne–Thompson–Uther Index for folktale classification.

== Historic locations ==
Pliny the Elder writes that in Italy there were some small islands (modern Torricella, Praca, Brace and other rocks) which were called Ithacesiae because of a watchtower that Odysseus built there.

According to ancient Greek tradition, Odysseus founded a city in Iberia which was called Odysseia (Ὀδύσσεια) or Odysseis (Ὀδυσσεῖς) which had a sanctuary of goddess Athena. Ancient authors identified it with Olisipo (modern Lisbon), but modern researchers believe that even its existence is uncertain.

Hellanicus of Lesbos wrote that Rome was founded by Aeneas and Odysseus who came together there. Other ancient historians, including Damastes of Sigeum, agreed with him.

According to tradition, Odysseus founded Bouneima in Epirus, near Trampya, a city associated with his return, after receiving an oracle instructing him to go to people "who know nothing of the sea". After arriving there, he sacrificed a bull and established the settlement.

== Role as a figure of worship ==
Evidence suggests the existence of a cult dedicated to Odysseus on Ithaca. This evidence includes public games called the Odysseia (τά Ὀδύσσεια) and a designated public gathering place or a sanctuary, known as the Odysseion (τό Ὀδύσσειον). In 2025, researchers identified what is believed to be the sanctuary of Odysseus at the site Agios Athanasios–School of Homer in northern Ithaca (known since the 19th century as the "School of Homer"). Two late Hellenistic inscriptions were discovered bearing "ΟΔΥCCEOC" (genitive) and "ΟΔΥCCEI" (dative). These align with an inscription found in the 1930s in the Polis Bay cave reading "ΕΥΧΗΝ ΟΔΥCCΕΙ" ("Thanks Odysseus"). Additional finds, such as a miniature bronze bust of Odysseus, 34 clay votive fragments, loom weights, jewelry, and over 100 coins, highlight the site's religious and social role during the Hellenistic and early Roman periods (3rd century BCE – 2nd century CE). The lower terrace, featuring architectural remains, carved dedication niches, and roof tiles inscribed with references to Apollo Agyieus and the symbol "ΔΗ" (which may indicate "public"), confirms the site's function in formal religious rituals. This indicates that the sanctuary catered to both local devotees and visiting pilgrims.

Strabo writes that on Meninx (Ancient Greek: Μῆνιγξ) island, modern Djerba at Tunisia, there was an altar to Odysseus.

Ancient sources also state that Odysseus was honored in Trampya.

The scholia to Lycophron's Alexandra preserve a reference to Aristotle's now lost Constitution of the Ithacans, noting that there was an oracle of Odysseus among the Aetolian Eurytanes.

In Sparta there was a shrine dedicated to Odysseus, the origin of which is explained through a tradition preserved by Plutarch. According to this account, Erginus, a descendant of Diomedes, stole the Palladium from Argos with the assistance of Leagrus, a companion of Temenus. Following a dispute with Temenus, Leagrus fled to Sparta carrying the sacred image, where it was received by the Spartan kings and installed near the shrine of the daughters of Leucippus. When the Spartans consulted the Delphic oracle regarding the Palladium's safekeeping, they were instructed that one of those responsible for its theft should become its guardian. In response, they established a shrine to Odysseus beside the Palladium, invoking the tradition that he had stolen the Trojan Palladium. His suitability as its guardian was further justified by his perceived connection to Sparta through his marriage to Penelope, whom the Spartans regarded as closely associated with their city.

== See also ==
- Odysseus Unbound
