= Cassiphone =

Greek mythological character

Cassiphone (/kəˈsɪfəniː/; Ancient Greek: Κασσιφόνη, romanized: Kassiphónē, lit. 'fratricide') is a minor figure in Greek mythology, the daughter of the sorceress-goddess Circe and the Trojan War hero Odysseus. Cassiphone and her tale do not appear in the Odyssey, the epic poem that narrates Odysseus' adventures, but rather she is mentioned in passing in the works of the Hellenistic poet Lycophron and the 12th-century Byzantine scholar John Tzetzes. Cassiphone is notable for killing Telemachus, her paternal half-brother and husband in some versions.

== Etymology ==
Cassiphone's name is a compound word, a variant of Kasiphone, that translates to "brother killer", from the words κάσις (kásis) meaning both "brother" and "sister", and φόνος (phónos) meaning "murder, manslaughter".

== Family ==
Cassiphone is the daughter of Odysseus and the witch-goddess Circe whom he met during his ten-year journey back home following the fall and sack of Troy. Although many children are attributed to Odysseus and his various liaisons, Cassiphone is the only female one amongst them.

== Mythology ==
Cassiphone is alluded to in obscure lines in Hellenistic poet Lycophron's poem Alexandra, with further explanation provided in the commentary of twelfth-century Byzantine scholar John Tzetzes, who is the only one to mention her by name; she is most likely a late classical or Hellenistic invention, whose only purpose is to expand on the myth of Telegonus, the son of Odysseus and Circe. Lycophron writes:

When he (Note: Odysseus.) is dead, Perge, hill of the Tyrrhenians, shall receive his ashes in the land of Gortyn; when, as he breathes out his life, he shall bewail the fate of his son (Note: Telemachus.) and his wife, (Note: Circe.) whom her husband shall slay and himself next pass to Hades, his throat cut by the hands of his sister, (Note: Cassiphone.) the own cousin of Glaucon and Apsyrtus. (Note: Glaucus and Absyrtus are first cousins to Cassiphone as the sons of Pasiphaë and Aeëtes respectively, Circe's full-siblings. All three are the children of the sun-god Helios and the Oceanid nymph Perse.)

— Lycophron, Alexandra 805–811 (trans. A. W. Mair.)

According to Tzetzes, Cassiphone is the daughter Odysseus had by Circe with whom he spent one year together during his long travels to get back home to Ithaca following the end of the Trojan War and his adventures at sea. The story of the Telegony, the lost sequel to the Odyssey, goes that her full-brother Telegonus left in search of the father he never knew, arrived in Ithaca and there he accidentally ended up killing Odysseus, as he did not recognise him. Telegonus then married Odysseus's widow Penelope, while Circe married Telemachus, Odysseus's son by Penelope.

Although Lycophron's writing is vague, his account seems to attest that after that, Telemachus ended up killing his wife (who can only be Circe) for unclear reasons, and then was killed himself by his wife's daughter (and own sister) enacting revenge. Tzetzes on the other hand in his commentary on Lycophron writes, with more clarity, that after Odysseus' death Circe used her powers to bring him back to life, and he proceeded to wed Cassiphone to Telemachus, who was her half-brother. After some time Telemachus killed Circe, here his mother-in-law instead of wife, following a quarrell with her as he was angered with her for ordering him around, (Note: A 'remarkable feat' as Bell notes, given that Circe is an immortal goddess in all other texts.) prompting Cassiphone to kill Telemachus in order to avenge her slain mother. Odysseus then died again, this time of grief after witnessing those vile acts.

A different entry in Tzetzes' scholia claims that Circe brought Odysseus back to life with a potion, and then she wed Telegonus to Penelope and Telemachus to Cassiphone in the Isles of the Blessed, presumably so she might keep Odysseus to herself.

== Culture ==
Cassiphone is not mentioned any earlier than Lycophron, but she must have been known to his audience. She might have originated from a lost work of an earlier tragedian. Stanford theorised that it is also likely that her descriptive name was applied to her later as a nickname due to her actions in the myth, and that she was originally called something else, such as Anticlea, after her paternal grandmother.

== See also ==
Other fraticides in mythology and folklore:

- Cain
- Osiris myth
- Perses of Colchis

== Bibliography ==
- Apollodorus, The Library with an English Translation by Sir James George Frazer, F.B.A., F.R.S. in 2 Volumes, Cambridge, MA, Harvard University Press; London, William Heinemann Ltd. 1921. ISBN 0-674-99135-4. Online version at the Perseus Digital Library. Greek text available from the same website.
- Apollonius Rhodius, Argonautica translated by Edward P. Coleridge, B.A. London, George Bell and Sons publishers. 1889. Text available at Internet Archive.
- Bell, Robert E. (1991). Women of Classical Mythology: A Biographical Dictionary. ABC-CLIO. ISBN 0-87436-581-3.
- Grimal, Pierre (1987). The Dictionary of Classical Mythology. Wiley-Blackwell. ISBN 0-631-13209-0.
- Evelyn-White, Hugh G., Hesiod, the Homeric Hymns, and Homerica, with an English Translation, Cambridge, MA., Harvard University Press; London, William Heinemann Ltd. 1914.
- Gantz, Timothy (1996). Early Greek Myth: A Guide to Literary and Artistic Sources. Vol. II. Johns Hopkins University Press. ISBN 0-8018-4410-X.
- Hyginus, Gaius Julius, The Myths of Hyginus. Edited and translated by Mary A. Grant, Lawrence: University of Kansas Press, 1960.
- Liddell, Henry George; Scott, Robert (1940). A Greek-English Lexicon, revised and augmented throughout by Sir Henry Stuart Jones with the assistance of Roderick McKenzie. Oxford: Clarendon Press. Online version at Perseus.tufts project.
- Lycophron, Alexandra, in Callimachus, Lycophron, Aratus. Hymns and Epigrams. Lycophron: Alexandra. Aratus: Phaenomena. Translated by A. W. Mair, G. R. Mair. Loeb Classical Library 129. Cambridge, MA: Harvard University Press, 1921.
- Marcus Tullius Cicero, Nature of the Gods from the Treatises of M.T. Cicero translated by Charles Duke Yonge (1812–1891), Bohn edition of 1878. Online version at the Topos Text Project.
- Patsi-Garin, Emmy (1969). Επίτομο λεξικό Ελληνικής Μυθολογίας [Epitomic Dictionary of Greek Mythology] (in Greek). Athens: Χάρη Πάτση publications.
- Roscher, Wilhelm Heinrich (1894). Ausführliches Lexikon der griechischen und römischen Mythologie [Detailed dictionary of Greek and Roman mythology] (in German). Vol. 2. Leipzig: B.G. Teubner.
- Smith, William (1873). A Dictionary of Greek and Roman Biography and Mythology. London, UK: John Murray, printed by Spottiswoode and Co. Online text available at perseus.tufts.
- Stanford, W. B. (December 1973). "A New Name for Ulysses' Daughter?". The Classical Review. 23 (2): 126. doi:10.1017/S0009840X00240110. JSTOR 707808.
- Tzetzes, John, Lycophronis Alexandra. Vol. II: Scholia Continens, edited by Eduard Scheer, Berlin, Weidmann, 1881. Internet Archive.
