= Telephus of Pergamum =

Telephus of Pergamum (Ancient Greek: Τήλεφος ὁ Περγαμηνός) was a Greek Stoic grammarian and historian who flourished in the second century CE. He was a tutor of the future Roman emperor Lucius Verus.

According to his fellow Pergamene, Galen, Telephus lived to nearly one hundred years of age.

Telephus appears to have maintained that Homer represented the purest form of Greek, opposing stricter Atticist scholars who regarded Classical Athenian Greek as the only proper linguistic model.

The following works are attributed to Telephus of Pergamum by Suda:

- A grammatical work (its title is lost).
- Περὶ τῶν παρ' Ὁμήρῳ σχημάτων ῥητορικῶ (On the Rhetorical Figures in Homer) (2 books).
- Περὶ συντάξεως λόγου Ἀττικοῦ (On the Syntax of Attic Discourse) (5 books).
- Περὶ τῆς καθ᾿ Ὅμηρον ῥητορικῆς (On Rhetoric in Homer).
- Περὶ τῆς Ὁμήρου καὶ Πλάτωνος συμφωνίας (On the Agreement of Homer and Plato).
- Ποικίλης φιλομαθείας (Love of Varied Learning) (2 books).
- Βίους τραγικῶν καὶ κωμικῶν (Lives of Tragic and Comic Dramatists).
- Βιβλιακῆς ἐμπειρίας (Expertise concerning Books) (3 books), in which he discusses which books are worth buying.
- Ὅτι μόνος Ὅμηρος τῶν ἀρχαίων ἑλληνίζει (That Homer Alone among the Ancients Writes Correct Greek).
- Περιήγησιν Περγάμου (Description of Pergamum).
- Περὶ τοῦ ἐν Περγάμῳ Σεβαστίου (On the Temple of Augustus in Pergamum) (2 books).
- Περὶ τῶν Ἀθήνησι δικαστηρίων (On the Courts in Athens).
- Περὶ τῶν Ἀθήνησι νόμων καὶ ἐθῶν (On the Laws and Customs of Athens).
- Περὶ τῶν Περγάμου βασιλέων (On the Kings of Pergamum) (5 books).
- Περὶ χρήσεως ἤτοι ὀνομάτων ἐσθῆτος καὶ τῶν ἄλλων οἷς χρώμεθα (On the Names and Usage of Clothing and Other Everyday Objects), alphabetically arranged.
- Περὶ τῆς Ὀδυσσέως πλάνης (On the Wanderings of Odysseus).
- Ὠκυτόκιον (Easy Birth) (10 books), a collection of epithets and expressions intended to assist writers and orators in achieving fluent expression.

All of his works are lost, although a number of fragments and testimonia attributed to Telephus survive.
