= Callidice (queen of Thesprotia) =

Queen of Thesprotia in Greek mythology

In Greek mythology, Callidice (/kəˈlɪdɪsiː/; Ancient Greek: Καλλιδίκη, romanized: Kallidíkē, lit. 'beautiful justice') is a queen of Thesprotia in Epirus, an ancient region in northwestern Greece. In the Telegony, the lost sequel to the Odyssey, she marries the wandering hero Odysseus when he visits her land after the end of his marine adventures and helps her rule the kingdom and defeat her enemies. They have a son together, but after Callidice's death Odysseus returns again back to his homeland Ithaca.

== Family ==
There is a lot that is missing about the history of Callidice's family or lineage, other than she was from the royal family of Thesprotia.

== Mythology ==
In the Telegony, after Odysseus managed to get back home to Ithaca, he sailed away once more along the northern shore until he reached Thesprotia and the kingdom of Callidice, where he offered sacrifice to Poseidon in order to propitiate him as Tiresias had told him. The queen warmly welcomed Odysseus and urged him to stay, even offering him her kingdom. Although his wife Penelope was still alive and waiting for him in Ithaca, Odysseus nevertheless agreed to marry Callidice. Together, they ruled over Thesprotia for a number of years, during which Callidice bore him a son named Polypoetes.

At some point, a war broke out between Callidice's people and a neighbouring people, the Bryges. In the war that ensued Odysseus led the Thesprotians to victory. They were supported by Odysseus' patron goddess Athena, while the Bryges had the help of the war-god Ares, until Apollo intervened to separate the two gods. Following the war Callidice and Odysseus reigned over the land for some time until the queen's own death. Afterwards, she was succeeded to the throne by their son Polypoetes, as Odysseus decided to return to his wife and son in Ithaca instead of staying to rule Thesprotia.

== See also ==
- Hippolyta
- Epic Cycle

== Bibliography ==
- Apollodorus, The Library with an English Translation by Sir James George Frazer, F.B.A., F.R.S. in 2 Volumes, Cambridge, MA, Harvard University Press; London, William Heinemann Ltd. 1921. ISBN 0-674-99135-4. Online version at the Perseus Digital Library. Greek text available from the same website.
- Avery, Catherine B., ed. (1962). New Century Classical Handbook. New York, US: Appleton-Century-Crofts.
- Bell, Robert E. (1991). Women of Classical Mythology: A Biographical Dictionary. ABC-Clio. ISBN 9780874365818.
- Evelyn-White, Hugh G., Hesiod, the Homeric Hymns, and Homerica, with an English Translation, Cambridge, MA., Harvard University Press; London, William Heinemann Ltd. 1914.
- Gantz, Timothy (1996). Early Greek Myth: A Guide to Literary and Artistic Sources. Vol. II. Johns Hopkins University Press. ISBN 978-0-8018-5362-3.
- Grimal, Pierre (1987). The Dictionary of Classical Mythology. Wiley-Blackwell. ISBN 0-631-13209-0.
- March, Jennifer R. (May 31, 2014). Dictionary of Classical Mythology. Oxbow Books. ISBN 978-1-78297-635-6.
- Michel, Raphael (October 1, 2006). "Callidice". In Cancik, Hubert; Schneider, Helmuth (eds.). Brill's New Pauly. Basel: Brill Reference Online. doi:10.1163/1574-9347_bnp_e606190. ISSN 1574-9347.
- Tripp, Edward (June 1970). Crowell's Handbook of Classical Mythology (1st ed.). Thomas Y. Crowell Co. ISBN 069022608X.
