= Xenagoras (historian) =

Greek historian

Xenagoras (Ancient Greek: Ξεναγόρας) was a Greek historian from Heraclea Pontica quoted by Dionysius of Halicarnassus, from whom we learn that Xenagoras wrote that Odysseus and Circe had three sons, Rhomos, Anteias, and Ardeas, who founded the three cities which were called by their names. He wrote a work titled Chronicle (Χρόνοι), and another on islands (Περὶ νήσων). The 5th-century AD writer Macrobius also refers to the third book of the history of Xenagoras.

This Xenagoras was possibly the same Xenagoras as father of the historian Nymphis.
