= Telemachus =

Mythological son of Odysseus

- Prince of Ithaca
- Attic skyphos red-figure artwork of Telemachus leaving Penelope by the Penelope Painter
- Region: Ithaca

Genealogy
- Parents: Odysseus (father); Penelope (mother)
- Spouse: Circe, or Cassiphone or Polycaste or Nausicaa
- Children: Latinus, Persepolis, Ptoliporthus, Poliporthes

Telemachus (/təˈlɛməkəs/ tə-LEM-ə-kəs; Ancient Greek: Τηλέμᾰχος, romanized: Tēlémăkhos, lit. 'far-fighter', IPA: [tɛː.lé.ma.kʰos]) is the son of Odysseus and Penelope in Greek mythology, and a central character in Homer's Odyssey. When Telemachus reached manhood, he visited Pylos and Sparta in search of his wandering father. On his return to Ithaca, he found that Odysseus had reached home before him. Then father and son slew the suitors who had gathered around to woo Penelope.

The first four books of the Odyssey focus on Telemachus's journeys in search of news about his father, who has yet to return home from the Trojan War, and are traditionally given the title Telemachy.

== Etymology ==
Telemachus's name in Greek means "far from battle", or perhaps "fighting from afar", as a bowman does.

== Odyssey ==
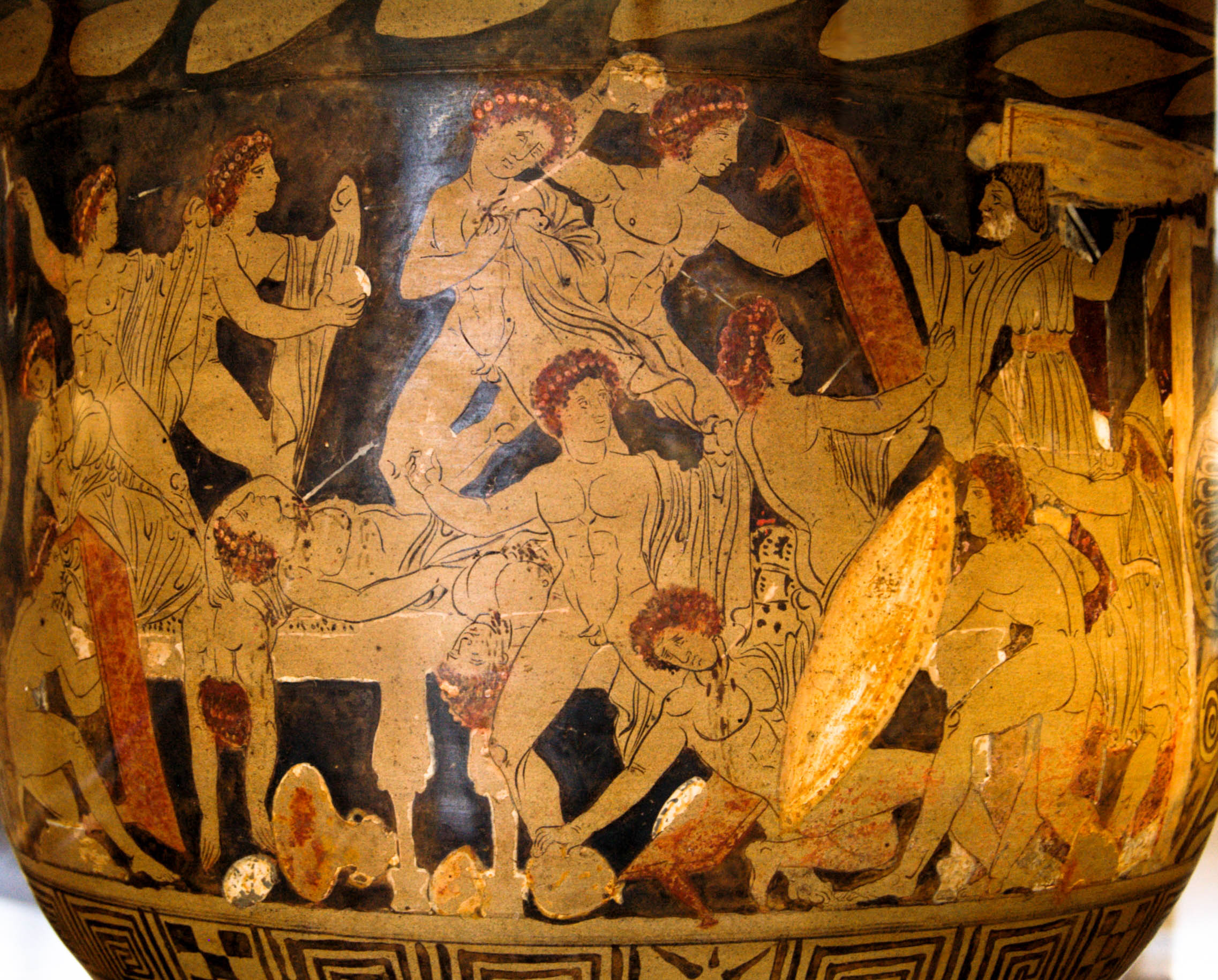
Slaughter of the suitors by Odysseus and Telemachus, Campanian red-figure bell-krater, ca. 330 BC, Louvre (CA 7124)

In Homer's Odyssey, Telemachus, under the instructions of Athena (who accompanies him during the quest), spends the first four books trying to gain knowledge of his father, Odysseus, who left for Troy when Telemachus was still an infant. At the outset of Telemachus's journey, Odysseus had been absent from his home at Ithaca for twenty years due to the Trojan War and the intervention of Poseidon. During his absence, Odysseus's house has been occupied by hordes of suitors seeking the hand of Penelope. Telemachus sets out and visits Nestor, being well received by the old man who regales him with stories of his father's glory. Telemachus then departs with Nestor's son Peisistratus, who accompanies him to the halls of Menelaus and his wife Helen. While there, Telemachus is again treated as an honored guest as Menelaus and Helen tell complementary yet contradictory stories of his father's exploits at Troy. Telemachus also learns from Menelaus that his father was last seen stranded on Ogygia.

Telemachus focuses on his father's return to Ithaca in Book XV. He visits Eumaeus, the swineherd, who happens to be hosting a disguised Odysseus. After Odysseus reveals himself to Telemachus due to Athena's advice, the two men plan the downfall of the suitors. Telemachus then returns to the palace to keep an eye on the suitors and to await his father as the beggar.

When Penelope challenges the suitors to string Odysseus's bow and shoot an arrow through the handle-holes of twelve axe heads, Telemachus is the first to attempt the task. He would have completed the task, nearly stringing the bow on his fourth attempt; however, Odysseus subtly stops him before he can finish his attempt. Following the suitors' failure at this task, Odysseus reveals himself and he and Telemachus bring swift and bloody death to the suitors.

After the treacherous maids are forced into cleaning up the carnage, Telemachus overrides his father’s orders of executing the maids with a clean death to the sword by ordering them hung instead, out of revenge towards his enemies’ lovers for being cruel to him and his mother. Afterwards, Odysseus needs to distract the general public for the time being due to the massacre of the suitors, so he asks Telemachus and the servants to stage a fake wedding for Penelope as he goes off to formally reunite with her.

One day later, Telemachus and several servants meet up with his father and grandfather, Laertes, to have a meal together. Once the families of the suitors march over to have their revenge against Odysseus, Telemachus fights alongside his father until Athena orders the violence to stop and demands for both sides to make peace.

== Telegony ==
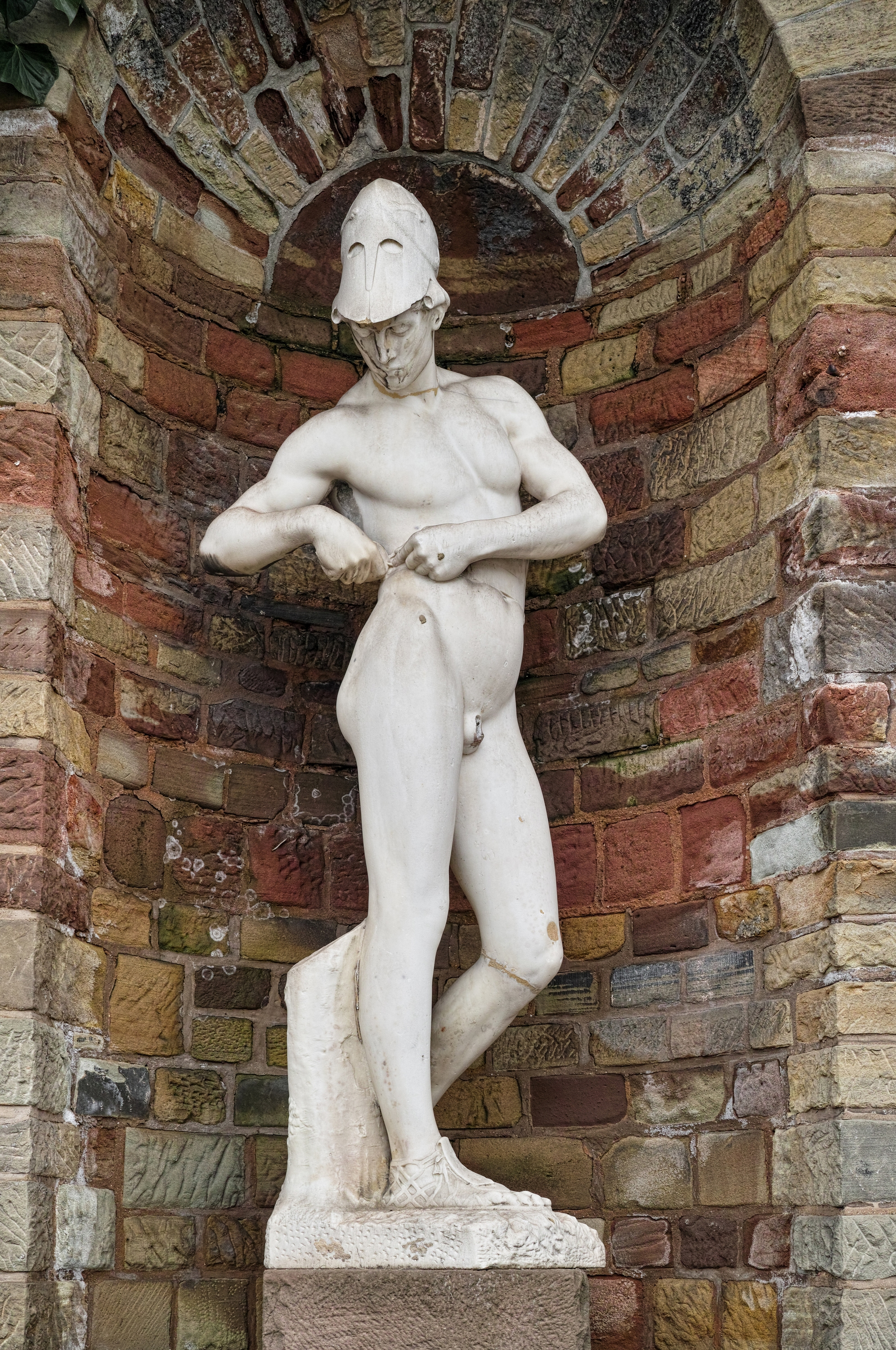
Statue depicting Telemachus

The Telegony was a short two-book epic poem recounting the life and death of Odysseus after the events of the Odyssey. In this mythological postscript, Odysseus is accidentally killed by Telegonus, his unknown son by the goddess Circe. After Odysseus's death, Telemachus returns to Aeaea with Telegonus and Penelope, and there marries Circe.

Seemingly later tradition included the character of Cassiphone—the daughter of Odysseus and Circe, and therefore half-sister of Telemachus—in the narrative. In this account, Telemachus still marries Circe, but Odysseus is resurrected by Circe at some point.

== Later classical authors ==
From the Dictionary of Greek and Roman Biography and Mythology: In the post-Homeric traditions, we read that Palamedes, when endeavouring to persuade Odysseus to join the Greeks against Troy, and the latter feigned idiocy, placed the infant Telemachus before the plough with which Odysseus was ploughing.

In Contest of Homer and Hesiod, it is alleged that the Roman Emperor Hadrian asked the Delphic Oracle about Homer's birthplace and parentage. The Oracle replied that Homer came from Ithaca and that Telemachus was his father by Epicasta, daughter of Nestor.

According to Aristotle and Hellanicus, Telemachus married Nausicaa, King Alcinous's daughter, and fathered a son named Persepolis.

Eustathius says that the mother was Polycaste, the daughter of Nestor. Others relate that he became the father of Latinus by Circe. He is also said to have had a daughter called Roma, who married Aeneas.

Servius makes Telemachus the founder of the town of Clusium in Etruria.

== Other appearances ==
Les Aventures de Télémaque is a didactic novel by François Fénelon. Telemachus was the subject of numerous operas throughout the eighteenth century, most based on Fénelon's novel. Among the most famous of these operas were André Cardinal Destouches's Télémaque (1714), Alessandro Scarlatti's Telemaco (1718), Gluck's Telemaco, ossia L'isola di Circe (1765), Giuseppe Gazzaniga's Gli errori di Telemaco (1776), Jean-François Le Sueur's Télémaque dans l'île de Calypso ou Le triomphe de la sagesse (1796), Simon Mayr's Telemaco nell'isola di Calipso (1797), and Fernando Sor's Telemaco nell'isola di Calipso (1797).

Telemachus appears in "Ulysses", an 1833 poem by Alfred, Lord Tennyson, in which the title speaker (based on Dante's version) hands over his throne to him to spend the rest of his life wandering.

Telemachus is a frequent character in the poetry of Louise Glück.

Telemachus is featured in a musical adaptation of the Odyssey entitled Epic: The Musical voiced by Miguel Veloso.

Belgian author Marnix Gijsen gave the title "Telemachus in het dorp" to a partly autobiographical romance, describing a young intellectual's growing up in a rural village.

Telemachus was also portrayed by the British actor Tom Holland in the 2026 film The Odyssey.
