= Ardea, Lazio =

Ardea
- Comune
- Comune di Ardea
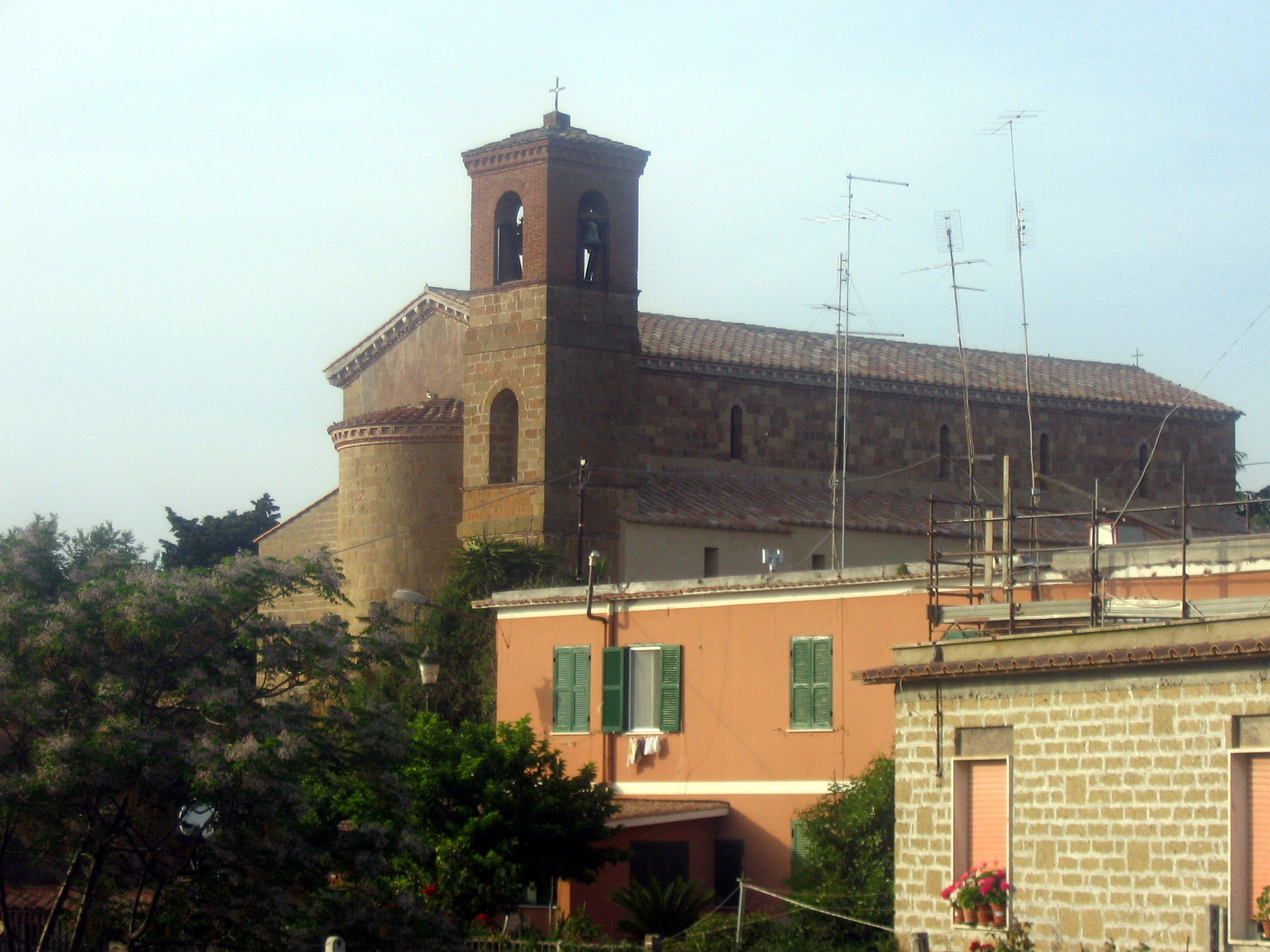
- The church of St. Peter

- Location within Italy Location within Lazio
- Coordinates: 41°37′N 12°33′E
- Country: Italy
- Region: Lazio
- Metropolitan city: Rome (RM)
- Frazioni: Banditella, Nuova Florida, Castagnetta, Castagnola, Centro Regina, Nuova California, Colle Romito, Lido dei Pini, Marina di Ardea, Rio Verde, Tor San Lorenzo, Tor San Lorenzo Lido, Montagnano.

Government
  - Mayor: Maurizio Cremonini (Fdl)

Area
  - Total: 72.09 km^{2} (27.83 sq mi)
- Elevation: 37 m (121 ft)

Population (2026)
  - Total: 51,374
  - Density: 712.6/km^{2} (1,846/sq mi)
- Demonym: Ardeatini
- Time zone: UTC+1 (CET)
  - Summer (DST): UTC+2 (CEST)
- Postal code: 00040
- Dialing code: 06
- Patron saint: St. Peter the Apostle
- Saint day: June 29
- Website: Official website

Ardea (Ancient Greek: Ἀρδέα) is a city and comune (municipality) in the Metropolitan City of Rome Capital in the region of Lazio in Italy, 35 kilometres (22 miles) south of the city centre of Rome and about 4 kilometres (2 miles) from the Mediterranean coast. It has 51,374 inhabitants.

The economy is mostly based on agriculture, although, starting from the 1970s, industry has played an increasingly important role.

== History ==
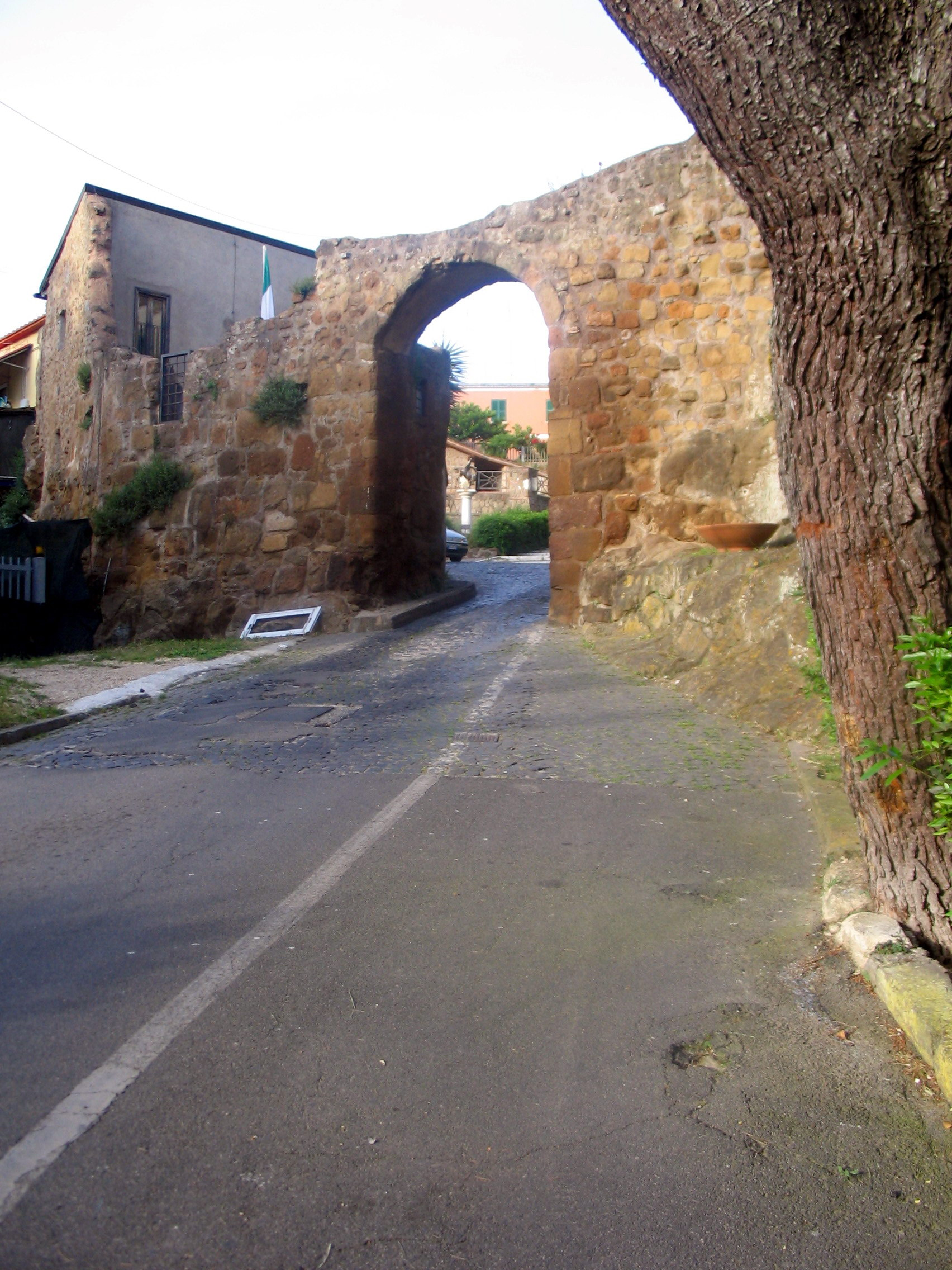
City gate

Ardea is one of the most ancient towns in western Europe, founded during the 8th century BC.

The city's foundation is attributed to different sources. The Hellenistic historian Xenagoras suggested it was established by Ardeas, a son of Odysseus and Circe, while another tradition attributes it to Danaë, the mother of Perseus. Both versions imply a Pelasgic origin. In the Aeneid, Ardea is portrayed as the capital of the Rutuli, a people who either vanished or merged into the Latin population. Despite this, their king, Turnus, is depicted as being under Latinus' authority while maintaining his own sovereignty. Barthold Georg Niebuhr considered Ardea to have been the chief city of the Pelasgian segment of the Latin nation. He also connected Turnus to the Tyrrhenians.

In 509 BC, Lucius Tarquinius Superbus, the king of Rome, sought unsuccessfully to take the town by storm, and then commenced a siege of the town. However, the siege was interrupted by the revolution which resulted in the overthrow of the king and the establishment of the Roman Republic. One of the leaders of the revolution, Lucius Junius Brutus, came to the camp of the Roman army at Ardea and won the army's support for the revolution.

In 443 BC, the Volscians laid siege to Ardea. The siege was soon broken by Roman troops under the leadership of Marcus Geganius Macerinus.

Livy mentions that the Ardeans along with Zacynthians, were involved in founding Saguntum in Spain, likely in the 5th c BCE.

During the Second Punic War, it was one of the few cities that refused military support to Rome, and, after the Roman victory, was deprived of its autonomy. After the Roman conquest, Ardea was most often mentioned in connection with the Via Ardeatina, one of the consular roads, to which it gave its name. In the 3rd–2nd centuries BC, it decayed until, in the Imperial Age, it was scarcely populated at all. The 1st century agricultural writer Columella possessed estates there.

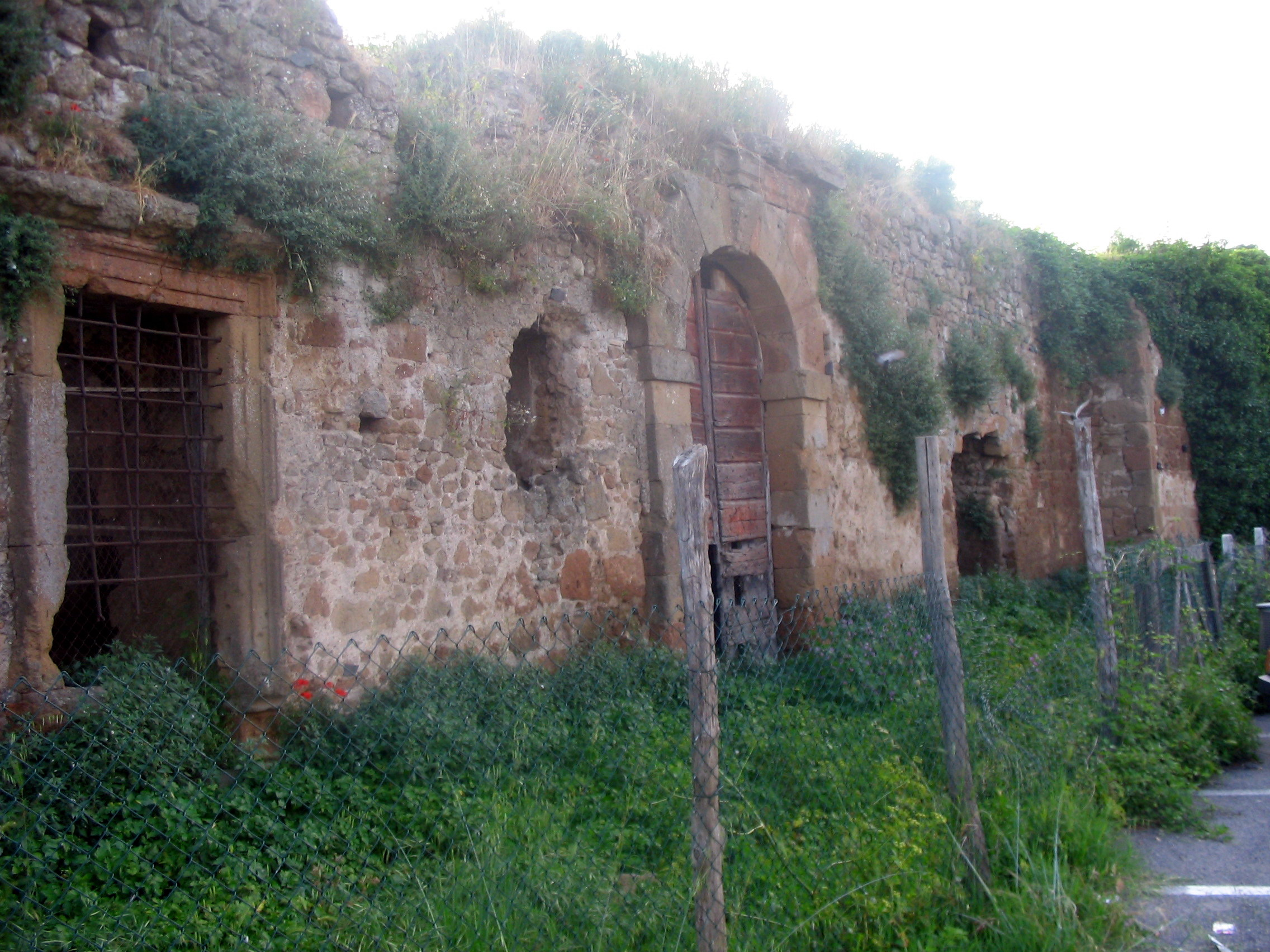
A view of the ancient agger

After the fall of the Western Roman Empire, Ardea was abandoned. It returned to grow only after the 9th century AD. Its castle in 1118 housed Pope Gelasius II and was later contended among various feudal barons of the area. In 1419, Pope Martin V assigned it to his kinsmen, the Colonna family, who sold it in 1564 to the Cesarini.

In 1816, it became a frazione of Genzano. Starting from 1932, the surrounding area was drained and Ardea began to flourish again, becoming a frazione of Pomezia starting from its foundation around 1948 and an independent municipality in 1970.

== Demographics ==
Historical population
Year	Pop.	±%
1861	-	—
1871	142	—
1881	183	+28.9%
1901	283	+54.6%
1911	348	+23.0%
1921	443	+27.3%
1931	625	+41.1%
1936	772	+23.5%
1951	2,163	+180.2%
1961	3,815	+76.4%
1971	6,197	+62.4%
1981	10,175	+64.2%
1991	16,854	+65.6%
2001	26,711	+58.5%
2011	44,202	+65.5%
2021	48,864	+10.5%
Source: ISTAT

As of 2026, the population is 51,374, of which 50.8% are males, and 49.2% are females. Minors make up 15.0% of the population, and seniors make up 20.6%.

=== Immigration ===
As of 2025, immigrants make up 14.7% of the population. The 5 largest foreign countries of birth are Romania, India, Morocco, Bulgaria, and Poland.

== Main sights ==
Remains of the ancient city include the old defensive agger, dating to the 7th century BC and later (4th century BC) updated to larger walls. Archaeological excavations have brought to light four temples, of unknown dedication. Part of the pavement of a basilica (c. 100 BC) have also been found in the area of the ancient Forum. Other sights include:

- The Church of Santa Marina, erected in 1191 by Cencio Savelli, the future Pope Honorius III. The interior, on a single nave, was originally entirely frescoed.
- Romanesque Church of San Pietro Apostolo (12th century), which was a possession of the monks of San Paolo Fuori le Mura of Rome. It incorporates a former watchtower used to counter Saracen attacks, now turned into a bell tower. It has 15th-century frescoes and a 16th-century wooden crucifix.
- The Giardini della Landriana, designed by Russell Page.
- Giacomo Manzù Museum, housing some 400 works of the artist.
- Tor San Lorenzo, a tower in the eponymous seaside frazione. It was rebuilt in 1570 after a design by Michelangelo, in the area of a former Palaeo-Christian church devoted to St. Lawrence.

== International relations ==
=== Twin towns – sister cities ===
Ardea is twinned with:

- Argos, Greece
- Rielasingen-Worblingen, Germany

== Sources ==
- Livy, Ab urbe condita 4.9
