= Polypoetes =

Characters in Greek mythology

In Greek mythology, Polypoetes (/ˌpɒlɪˈpiːtiːz/; Ancient Greek: Πολυποίτης, romanized: Polupoítēs or Polypoites, lit. 'the one who makes much' or 'much-making', ) was a name attributed to the following individuals:

- Polypoetes, the Aetolian son of Apollo and Phthia, brother of Dorus and Laodocus. He was killed by Aetolus.
- Polypoetes, son of Hippodamia and Pirithous. A native of the Thessalian city of Gyrtone (Γυρτώνη), he led the armies of Thessaly on the side of the Greeks during the Trojan War. He was among those who vied for Helen's hand in marriage, and later occupied the Trojan horse. Following the death of Patroclus, he won an early version of quoits, winning a 5-year supply of iron. After the war, he was present at the funerals of Calchas and Patroclus. His close companion was Leonteus.
- Polypoetes, one of the Suitors of Penelope who came from Dulichium along with other 56 wooers. He, with the other suitors, was killed by Odysseus with the help of Eumaeus, Philoetius, and Telemachus.
- Polypoetes, son of Odysseus and Callidice, queen of the Thesprotians. He succeeded his mother to the throne following her death.
