= Ardeas =

Son of Odysseus in Greek mythology

According to the Greek historian Xenagoras, Ardeas or Ardias or Ardeias (Ancient Greek: Ἀρδείας) was a son of Odysseus and Circe. He was said to have founded Ardea, a city in Latium.
