= Circe in popular culture =

Circe, an enchantress and minor goddess in Greek mythology, appears often in 20th and 21st century popular culture, either under her own name or as a sorceress with similar powers under others. Post-Classical amplifications and reinterpretations of that story and others involving her are dealt with in the main article. The instances mentioned here are more recent allusions and adaptations.

== Literature ==
- James Joyce's 1922 novel Ulysses includes a chapter based on Homer's Circe episode (see "Circe") in which a brothel owner named Bella Cohen is loosely based on the classical Circe.
- In John Myers Myers's 1949 novel Silverlock, Circe turns the main character into a pig due to his proclivity for food and fornication.
- Although Julio Cortázar titled one of his short stories "Circe" (1951), its main theme is about perverse sexual gratification in a repressed Catholic environment. Delia Mañara is notorious in her quarter of Buenos Aires for the mysterious deaths of two of her fiancés. She lives in a twilight world and gains most satisfaction through the exercise of power over others. It emerges that she killed the two men by poisoning them with the sweets she makes; when this fails with her third fiancé, he is freed from her fatal attraction by the knowledge. In 1964 it was made into a film in Argentina with Graciela Borges as Delia.
- In 1992 novel The Brothers K by David James Duncan, Everett has an extended sexual encounter with a woman named Circe. At one point she shows him a mirror and he sees himself as a pig in his reflection.
- Circe appears in Dan Simmons' 2005 science-fiction novel Olympos, whose plot draws upon The Odyssey.
- In Rick Riordan's 2006 novel The Sea of Monsters Circe runs an island health spa and turns Percy Jackson into a guinea pig (she says that they are "much more convenient" than real pigs), and his friend Annabeth Chase uses magical multivitamins to restore Percy to his true form. It is revealed she turned Blackbeard and some of his crew into guinea pigs, and once they turn back they wreck the place. Circe also appears in subsequent novels in the series.
- Volodymyr Yermolenko, Ukrainian philosopher and essayist, wrote Ocean Catcher: The Story of Odysseus, Stary Lev, 2017, which is loose adaptation of The Odyssey, where after coming back home to Ithaca, where he cannot find neither Penelope nor Telemachus, he decides to have a reverse trip to Troy, where he again meets Circe and Calypso.
- In 2018, American author Madeline Miller published Circe, a novel retelling the life of the sorceress from her own perspective. The book explores her exile among gods, the discovery of her magical powers, and her encounters with mythological figures, such as Odysseus, Medea, and the Minotaur.

== Comics ==
- In the DC Universe, Circe is an enemy of Wonder Woman, and is in league with the witchcraft goddess Hecate. During the Silver Age of comic books, she was also an occasional enemy of Superman, driven to seek revenge on him for spurning her love.
- In DC's Absolute Universe, a version of Circe appears in Absolute Wonder Woman as Diana's adoptive mother after she was left in her care by Apollo. Initially reluctant, she raises Diana on the Wild Isle in Hell, teaching her magic
- In the Marvel Universe, the Eternal superheroine Sersi, is based on Circe. She has similar transformative abilities, and turned Odysseus's men into pigs not out of malice, but because they were misbehaving at one of her parties.
- In the 1963 Carl Barks comic Oddball Odyssey, Magica de Spell impersonates a modern-day descendant of Circe and lures Scrooge McDuck to a Mediterranean island to bid on "ancient treasure" (actually worthless imitations). Her initial plan fails, but she then discovers a sealed-up cave that turns out to be where the real Circe once lived. Finding Circe's magic wand, Magica proceeds to turn Scrooge, Donald Duck and his young nephews into animals, referencing Circe's abilities in the original Odyssey. Only the eventual destruction of the wand prevents Magica's triumph. However, in some later Carl Barks stories Magica is still using formulas she says she found in Circe's cave.

== Film and television ==
- Circe was portrayed as the beautiful seductress by Silvana Mangano in the 1954 film Ulysses, keeping Kirk Douglas as her willful prisoner. Mangano also plays a double role in the film as Ulysses' faithful wife Penelope.
- In the 1968 European television miniseries Odissea (dal Poema di Omero), Circe is portrayed by French actress Juliette Mayniel.
- In the 1983 film Hercules, Circe is played by Mirella D'Angelo and appears first as an old woman. Transformed by drinking the hero's blood, she helps him when he is attacked by the robots that stand in for monsters in this 'updated' version, but for selfish reasons of her own.
- An unnamed woman often identified as Circe appears in the 1989 film Nostos: The Return, a film inspired by the Odyssey
- Circe is portrayed by Bernadette Peters in the 1997 American television miniseries The Odyssey as a more flippant and seductive character.
- Circe appeared disguised as "Mrs. Cissy Hawk" ("hawk" being the English version of "Circe") in the episode "The Remarkable Mrs. Hawk" on the show Thriller, hosted by Boris Karloff. The episode was based on the short story "Mrs. Hawk" by Margaret St. Clair, originally published in the July 1950 issue of Weird Tales.
- Circe appears in the sixth and 12th episodes of first series of 2013 drama series Atlantis, portrayed by Lucy Cohu.
- Circe appeared in the cartoon Ulysses 31 where she attempted to build a tower that would house all the knowledge of the universe, thus making her more powerful than the gods.
- Circe appears in the Hercules episode "Hercules and the Song of Circe", voiced by Idina Menzel. This version wields a dragon-headed magic staff, and in search of "one good man" picks Hercules' best friend Icarus. When she tires of his foolish behavior, she turns him into a platypus, later, Hercules into a lemur and Adonis into a peacock.
- In an episode of the Disney animated series DuckTales, titled "Home, Sweet Homer", Circe (voiced by Tress MacNeille) appears as an anthropomorphic pig with a pet black cat. She attempts to send Homer forward in time, but her cat interrupts the spell, and instead Scrooge McDuck, Huey, Dewey and Louie are brought back in time to ancient Greece. She eventually succeeds in turning Queen Ariel, Homer, and Scrooge into pigs, but is later foiled when Huey shatters her medallion, reversing her spells and turning her into an ordinary (i.e., non-anthropomorphic) pig.
- The DC Comics incarnation of Circe appears in the Justice League Unlimited episode "This Little Piggy", voiced by Rachel York. Upon her release from imprisonment in Hades, Circe is barred from attacking Hippolyta, and decides to get revenge by turning Wonder Woman into a pig. However, Batman and Zatanna track her down and convince her to restore Wonder Woman to normal, accepting a deal where Batman will 'sacrifice' his dignity by singing in a club.
- The DC Comics incarnation of Circe appears in the Justice League Action episode "Luthor in Paradise", voiced by Laura Post. She allies with Lex Luthor in an attempt to steal a mythical artifact called the Oculus of the Argo from the Amazons, though they are ultimately defeated by the Justice League.
- Circe appears in The Simpsons episode "Tales from the Public Domain", voiced by Tress MacNeille.
- In the book and television series Game of Thrones, major character Cersei Lannister draws name and traits from Circe.
- In part 3 of Chilling Adventures of Sabrina, the Pagan witch Circe has the ability to change a person into “any creature she’s ever seen.” She transforms friends of Harvey Kinkle into pigs (then back again). She also turns a solid stone Roz and Dorcas back to life.
- In the 2017 film Troy: The Odyssey, Circe, played by Lara Heller, is not portrayed as a wicked sorceress, but as a Trojan priestess and warrior taken hostage by Odysseus to protect his ship from the Kraken, and as a strong female character repeatedly saving Odysseus and his crew from the consequences of "their stupidity".
- Circe appears in Percy Jackson and the Olympians episode "We Check In to C.C.'s Spa & Resort", played by Rosemarie DeWitt. This version is owner of C.C.'s Spa & Resort, where have Percy Jackson and Annabeth Chase.
- In the 2026 film The Odyssey, Circe is portrayed by Samantha Morton.

== Video games ==
- Circe appears in Assassin's Creed Odyssey. Circe lives on an uninhabited, forested island, among tame boars, pigs, and lions.
- Circe appears on a Silver Wizard Card in the PC version of Harry Potter and the Chamber of Secrets.
- Circe is one of the summonable Servants that appears in the mobile game Fate/Grand Order, appearing under the Caster class. After the game's Salem story chapter was released, she was added to the permanent summoning pool. She also appears in the console game Fate/Samurai Remnant as the Rogue Caster, and can be recruited by the player character. Designed by Hidari (illustrator) (adapted by Wataru Rei for Fate/Samurai Remnant) and voiced by Himika Akaneya.
- Circe appears in the mission 'Old Friends' of the campaign in the 2002 Ensemble Studios game Age of Mythology as an enemy waylaying Odysseus and his allies in her trademark human-to-animal fashion.
- Circe is briefly mentioned in the MMORPG Pirate101 as the Immortal that cursed the sirens Agalope, Calypso and Parthenope with their "irresistible" voices, which lured in Eagle captains to crash their ships into the island of Anthemusa.
- Circe is a playable character in the MOBA game Heroes of Newerth.
- The DC Comics incarnation of Circe appears as a boss in Justice League Heroes: The Flash.
- The DC Comics incarnation of Circe appears in DC Universe Online, voiced by Michelle Forbes.
- The DC Comics incarnation of Circe appears as a summonable character in Scribblenauts Unmasked: A DC Comics Adventure.
- In the game, Hades II (the sequel to Hades), "Madame Circe", a fellow sorceress of the Protagonist, Melinoë, is the 'Helpful-Hand' character, for "The Rift of Thessaly" the 2nd Surface Biome, having been stationed up on her private isle of Aiaia prior by Lady Hecate to be her eyes and ears there.
- Circe appears in the 2026 video game God of War Sons of Sparta, in which she resides on the Isle of Aeaea.

== Miscellaneous ==
- Circe appears in Epic: The Musical, a musical retelling of Homer's Odyssey. She is portrayed by Talya Sindel in the fourth concept album, The Circe Saga.
