= Circe (novel) =

2018 novel by Madeline Miller

- US 1st ed.
- Author: Madeline Miller
- Audio read by: Perdita Weeks
- Cover artist: Will Staehle
- Language: English
- Subject: Circe
- Genre: Fantasy
- Set in: Greek Heroic Age
- Publisher: Little, Brown (US); Bloomsbury (Int'l)
- Publication date: April 10, 2018 (US); April 19, 2018 (Int'l)
- Publication place: United States; International
- Media type: Print, ebook, kindle, audiobook
- Pages: 393 pp
- Awards: Athenaeum Award (2018); Goodread—Fantasy (2018); Kitschies—Novel (2018); Alex Awards (2019)
- ISBN: 9780316556347 (hardcover 1st ed.)
- OCLC: 1029608347
- Dewey Decimal: 813.6
- LC Class: PS3613.I5445 C57 2018b
- Website: Official website

Circe is a 2018 mythic fantasy novel by American writer Madeline Miller. Set during the Greek Heroic Age, it is an original reimagining of various Greek myths, most notably the Odyssey, as told from the perspective of the witch Circe. While drawing on characters and episodes from ancient myths, the novel invents or substantially reinterprets many aspects of Circe's biography, including Circe's encounters with mythological figures such as Hermes, the Minotaur, Jason, and Medea and ultimately, her romance with Odysseus and his son Telemachus.

== Plot ==
Circe is the divine daughter of the titan Helios and naiad Perse. In this reimagining, she is considered unattractive and powerless from birth, she is neglected by her father and bullied by the rest of her family. While still young, she witnesses the titan Prometheus being punished for giving fire to humanity and gives him nectar when no one is looking. She bonds with her younger brother Aeëtes, but he leaves her to rule his own kingdom.

Circe falls in love with Glaucos, a mortal fisherman. Circe feeds Glaucos sap of magical flowers grown in soil that was once soaked with the blood of the titan Kronos and transforms him into a god. Arrogant in his newfound divinity, however, Glaucos rejects Circe in favor of the nymph Scylla. Circe's jealousy causes her to use the flowers' magic again, transforming Scylla into a bloodthirsty six-headed monster. Circe confesses her deeds to Helios, who disbelieves her powers at first; Aeëtes reveals that he and his siblings are witches who can draw out magic from such herbs. To keep the peace between the Titans and the Olympians, led by Zeus, Helios and Perse are forbidden from having more children. Aeëtes and his other children are to be monitored, but Circe is punished for purposely seeking out the magic and using it on another god. Circe is permanently exiled to the island of Aiaia.

Circe uses her exile to hone her witchcraft. Over the centuries she spends on Aiaia, Circe interacts with many mythic figures. She receives visits from the Olympian god Hermes, whom she takes as a lover. She is escorted off the island by the mortal Daedalus. During her brief visit to Crete, Circe helps her sister birth the Minotaur and uses her witchcraft to help tame the monster. Many years later, the hero Jason and his wife the witch Medea (Circe's niece) arrive on Aiaia after having stolen the Golden Fleece from Circe's brother Aeëtes, murdering Medea's brother, Absyrtus, in the process. Circe cleanses them of the crime and warns Medea of Jason's waning interest in her but is rebuffed.

Circe enters a period of loneliness and is excited to host a group of forlorn sailors who arrive on Aiaia in search of food and rest. Once the sailors realize that Circe lives alone on the island, the ship captain rapes her. Circe uses her witchcraft to transform all the men into pigs. When subsequent ships arrive at her island she continues to do so, sparing only a handful of crewmen who behave with pious respect and do not attempt to force themselves on her. One ship arrives led by the hero Odysseus, who charms Circe into sparing his crew and hosting them on her island. Odysseus and his crew ultimately stay on Aiaia for one year. Though Odysseus and Circe have an affair, he leaves to continue his journey back to Ithaca, where his wife and child wait. Circe gives birth to a son, Telegonus.

Circe realizes that the goddess Athena threatens her son. Circe casts a spell to protect the island while Telegonus grows. When the teenage Telegonus begs to leave the island to meet his father, Circe acquires the poison tail of the marine god Trygon as a weapon for his protection. When Telegonus meets his father, however, Odysseus attacks him and is accidentally killed by the poisoned spear. Guilty, Telegonus returns home with Odysseus's wife, Penelope, and son Telemachus.

Having lost her hero Odysseus, Athena visits Aiaia to offer her patronage to Telemachus, who refuses her. Telegonus accepts in his stead and embarks on his own heroic journey. Forlorn by the loss of her son, Circe summons her father and asks him to negotiate with Zeus to end her exile. Helios initially refuses, but Circe blackmails him by threatening to inform Zeus of how she spoke with Prometheus, which could potentially start a war between the Olympians and Titans. With Telemachus's help, Circe uses the poison spear to turn Scylla to stone and collects more of the flowers she once used on Glaucos. Finding love with Telemachus, Circe uses the flowers' magic on herself with the intention of becoming mortal and living out her days traveling with him.

== Critical reception ==
In a review for The New York Times, Claire Messud describes Miller's Circe as "pleasurable," approving of its feminist themes and its "highly psychologized, redemptive and ultimately exculpatory account" of Circe's familiar tale. A review published via The Washington Post by Ron Charles contextualizes Miller's novel within the MeToo movement and praises her reimagining of Circe's story as "harrowing and unexpected", casting a "feminist light" on timeless tales that "illuminates details we hadn't noticed before." The Guardian's Aida Edemariam also praises Miller for finding novelty and "narrative propulsion" by anchoring her retelling around the "emotional life of a woman." In 2026, Goodreads named Circe the Best Fantasy Book of the Decade.

== Awards ==
Year	Award	Category	Result	Ref.
2018	Athenaeum Literary Award	—	Won	
2018	Goodreads Choice Awards	Fantasy	Won	
2018	Kitschies	Red Tentacle (Novel)	Won	
2018	Waterstones Book of the Year	—	Shortlisted	
2019	Alex Awards	—	Won	
2019	Andrew Carnegie Medals for Excellence	Fiction	Longlisted	
2019	Australian Book Industry Awards	International Book	Shortlisted	
2019	Books Are My Bag Readers' Awards	Fiction	Won	
2019	Books Are My Bag Readers' Awards	Beautiful Book	Shortlisted	
2019	Indies Choice Book Awards	Adult Fiction	Won	
2019	Joyce Carol Oates Literary Prize	—	Longlisted	
2019	Mythopoeic Awards	—	Shortlisted	
2019	RUSA CODES Reading List	Historical Fiction	Shortlisted	
2019	Women's Prize for Fiction	—	Shortlisted	
2020	International Dublin Literary Award	—	Longlisted	
2026	Goodreads Best Book of the Decade	Fantasy	Won	

== Adaptations ==
In 2019, HBO Max announced an eight-episode adaptation of the novel to be written and produced by Rick Jaffa and Amanda Silver. As of 2026, the adaptation remains stuck in development limbo.

== See also ==
- Circe
- Circe in popular culture
- The Song of Achilles
