= Aeaea =

Ancient Greek mythological location

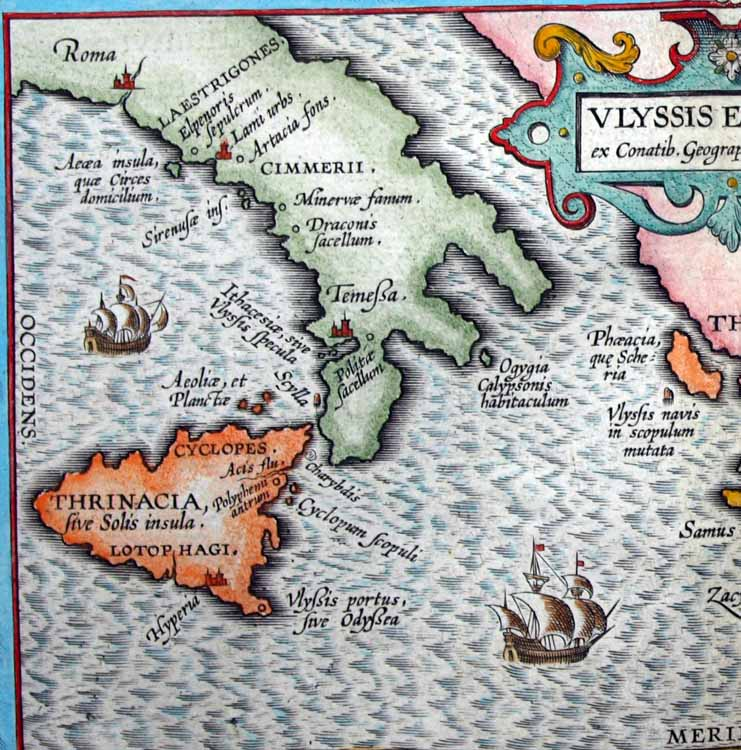
Map of Italy with Aeaea marked south of Rome (Abraham Ortelius, 1624)

Aeaea, Ææa, Ææ̈ä, or Eëä (/iː.ˈiː.ə/ ee-EE-ə or /ə.ˈiː.ə/ ə-EE-ə; Ancient Greek: Αἰαία, romanized: Aiaíā Ancient Greek pronunciation: [ai̯.ǎi̯.aː]) was a mythological island said to be the home of the goddess-sorceress Circe.

"Circe would fain have held me back in her halls, the guileful lady of Aeaea, yearning that I should be her husband."

— Homer, Odyssey, Book IX.32; trans. A. T. Murray; Loeb Classical Library 1919).

In Homer's Odyssey, Odysseus tells Alcinous that he stayed here for one year on his way home to Ithaca. Before leaving Aeaea, Odysseus was given instructions by Circe about how to cross the ocean and assisted by the North Wind to reach the underworld:

When your ship has traversed the stream of Oceanus, you will reach the fertile shore of Persephone's country with its groves of tall poplars and willows that shed their fruit untimely; here beach your ship upon the shore of Oceanus, and go straight on to the dark abode of Hades.

— Odyssey 10.505, tr. Samuel Butler

== Description ==
Homer describes Aeaea as covered with a mixture of pasture and dense woodland of oak and beech. There were high hills or bluffs from which the sea could be seen encircling the island in all directions. Circe's stone house was located in a "dense forest of trees" "in a place that could be seen from far."

== Location ==
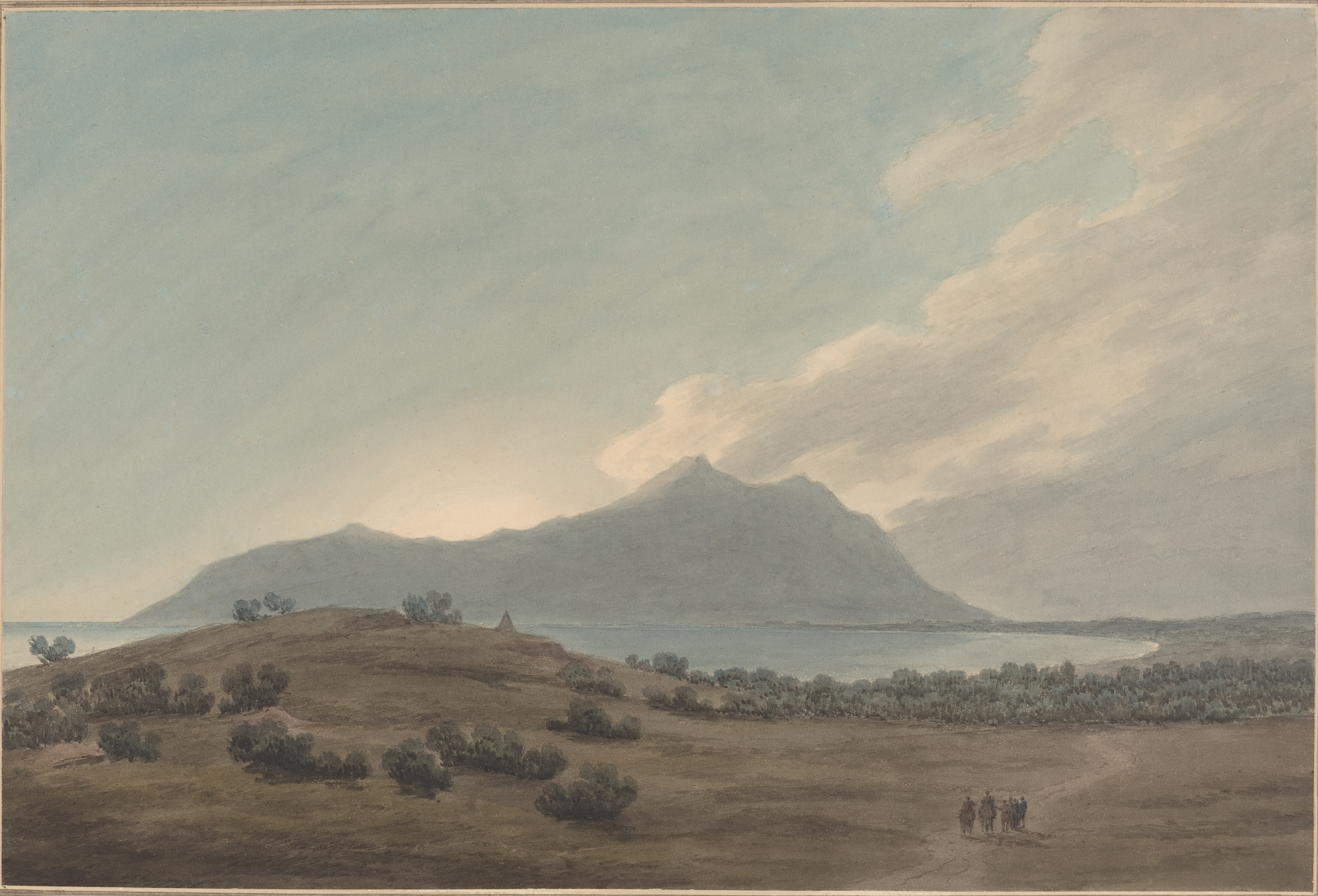
John Robert Cozens, Monte Circeo at Sunset. Monte Circeo is one suggested location for Aeaea.

The somewhat inconsistent geography of Homer's Odyssey is often considered more mythic than literal, but the geography of the Alexandrian scholar and poet Apollonius of Rhodes is more specific. In his epic Argonautica, he locates the island somewhere south of Aethalia (Elba), within view of the Tyrrhenian shore (western coast of Italy). In the same poem, Aeëtes remarks on the great distance between Colchis (on the Black Sea, in modern Georgia) and Aeaea in these terms:

I noted it once after taking a ride in my father Helius' chariot when he was taking my sister Circe to the western land and we came to the coast of the Tyrrhenian mainland, where she dwells to this day, very far from the Colchian land

— Argonautica 3.309–313

Aeaea was later identified by classical Roman writers with Mount Circeo on Cape Circeo (Cape Circaeum) on the western coast of Italy – about 100 kilometers south of Rome – which at that time may have looked like an island owing to the marshes and sea surrounding its base, but which now is a small peninsula. Dionysius of Halicarnassus wrote that it was already a peninsula in his time. However, it may have been still an island in the days of Homer, with a long "lido" or sandy peninsula that gradually became attached to the mainland – a common geological process. Archeologists have identified one cave or grotto on the cape as Grotta della Maga Circe ("cave of Circe"). A second cave was found on the nearby Island of Ponza. It is believed that Circe had her summer home on Mount Circe and her winter home on Ponza, which possibly was the island Homer called Aeaea.

The modern Greek scholar Ioannis Kakridis insists that any attempt at realistic identification is in vain, arguing that Homer vaguely located Aeaea somewhere in the eastern part of his world, perhaps near Colchis, since Circe was the sister of Aeëtes, king of Colchis, and because their paternal aunt the goddess Eos had her palace there. Cooper (1854, p. 266), in his edition of the Works of Virgil, comments on Aeneis: "She [Circe] is here called Aeaean, from Aea, an island and city of Colchis, not far from the river Phasis. She married a king of Sarmatia, whom she poisoned, after which she fled into Italy ..."

== Other hypothetical locations from literature ==
Robert Graves (The Greek Myths) points out Aeaea as the island of Lošinj, near the Istrian Peninsula in the north Adriatic Sea.

Fernando Jaume identifies the "Island of Circe" with Didyme aka Salina, the "erratic rocks" being the "Faraglioni di Lipari", next to the "Island of the Sirens" and the "Hades in Sicily", perhaps as many evocations of the volcanism of this archipelago. The narrow beach and the forests dedicated to Persephone would be there, in Acquedolci, and Sicily is the home of Circe's father Helios's sacred herds of oxen and sheep.

Tim Severin names in The Ulysses Voyage the island of Paxos near the Greek coast of the Ionian Sea. He describes it as the furthest west on a boundary of the sea and the river of Okeanos, the mythological freshwater river that encircles the Earth. Drawing upon this interpretation, Assassin's Creed Odyssey uses a fictional atoll point off the coast of Paxos as the location.

== Aeaea in literature ==
In Richard Aldington's novel All Men are Enemies (1933), Aeaea is the island, "twelve hours from Naples" (obviously mythical), where his heroes meet, and love between them flourishes.

John Banville's 1993 novel Ghosts has a boating party shipwrecked on an unnamed island; one character, Sophie, speculates that it is Aeaea; another says, "Yes... yes, Aeaea: you will feel at home, no doubt", a reference to Sophie's Circean nature.

"Aeaean" was an epithet of Circe and her paternal niece Medea (Αἰαίη), who were the sister and daughter of Aeëtes, the ruler of Aea (Αἶα) in Colchis. Circe's son Telegonus is likewise given this epithet. It was also a name of Calypso, who was believed to have inhabited a small island of the name of Aeaea in the straits between Italy and Sicily.

Madeline Miller's 2018 novel Circe is mainly set on Aeaea, portrayed as a location of woods and flowers populated by tame lions and wolves. While exiled there by her father Helios the heroine Circe is able to live in a magically maintained dwelling. She deals with external threats by turning offending seafarers into swine.
