= Rita Boumi-Pappa =

Greek poet, translator and writer

Rita Boumi-Pappa (1906–1984) was a Greek poet, translator and short story writer. She published a total of sixteen poetry books, one being in Italian.

== Early life ==
Boumi was born in Syros, an island in the Cyclades, in 1906. At the age of 15, she moved with her older brother to Syracuse in Italy. Whilst her brother, who was married to an Italian woman, was committed to Italian fascism at this time, Boumi was affected by the poverty of the population and drawn into the socialist cause. In 1929, she returned to her home island, where she directed an organisation for children's protection between 1930 and 1936. She married fellow poet Nikos Pappas in 1936. They spent three years in Nikos' hometown of Trikala in Thessaly and moved to Athens in 1939.

== Literary career ==
Her first book, Songs to Love (Greek: Τα τραγούδια στην αγάπη), was published in 1930. It consisted of love sonnets written in the traditional style and was critically well-received, with critics comparing her work to that of Sappho. She would cease the use of such formal uses of poetry in her later years. Her 1935 book, Pulse of My Silence (Greek: Οι σφυγμοί της σιγής μου) was awarded the First Prize for Poetry from the Academy of Athens. She also edited the literary periodicals Ionios Anthology (1929–30) and Cyclades (1930-32) in this period.

Her writing was heavily influenced by the Axis occupation of Greece and the subsequent Greek Civil War. This theme is evident in her 1963 collection, A Thousand Murdered Girls, where she recounts the stories of sixty-five girls who were executed for siding with the left during the Civil War. She tells the girls' stories through their own voices, using monologues in the verse form where each girl tells her own story.
