= Persephone in popular culture =

Greek goddess in popular culture

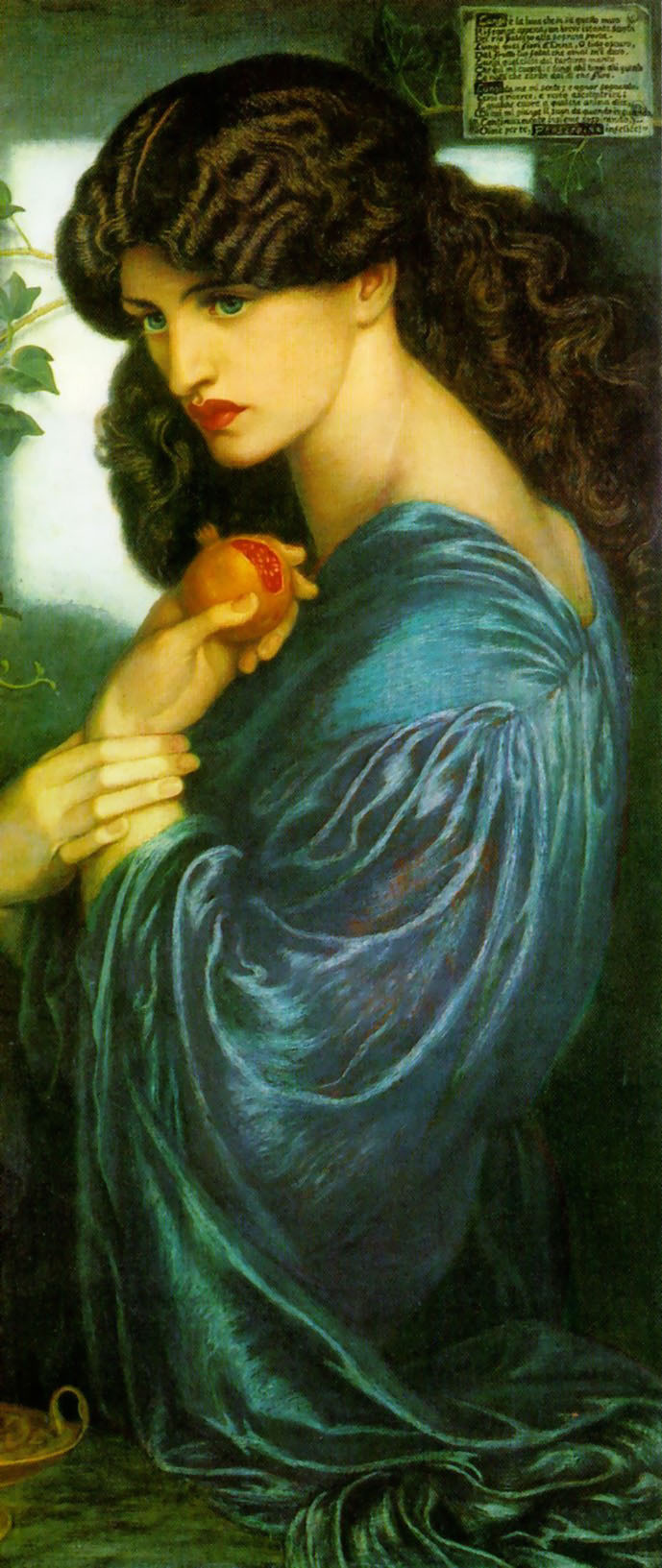
"Persephone" by Dante Gabriel Rossetti

Persephone, the daughter of Zeus and Demeter in Greek mythology, appears in films, works of literature, and in popular culture, both as a goddess character and through the symbolic use of her name. She becomes the queen of the underworld through her abduction by Hades, the god of the underworld. The myth of her abduction represents her dual function as the as chthonic (underworld) and vegetation goddess: a personification of vegetation, which shoots forth in Spring and withdraws into the earth after harvest. Proserpina is the Roman equivalent.

== In literature ==
- Mary Shelley wrote a "mythological drama" titled Proserpine, which was published in 1832.
- Algernon Charles Swinburne published "Hymn to Proserpine" and "The Garden of Proserpine" in 1866.
- Alfred Lord Tennyson wrote a poem called "Demeter and Persephone" published in 1889.
- Second April, a collection of poetry by Edna St. Vincent Millay published in 1921, contains two poems which make explicit reference to Persephone: "Ode to Silence" and "Prayer to Persephone."

== In popular novels, films, and webtoons ==
- In John C. Wright's Orphans of Chaos, "the Maiden", a title of Persephone's, is a candidate for the throne of Olympus after Zeus's death.
- Persephone can be seen as a background character in the 1997's Disney animated film Hercules. She is portrayed with violet skin and blonde hair, and always appears near Demeter.
- Persephone is a major supporting character in the Korean webnovel/webtoon Omniscient Reader's Viewpoint.
- Persephone, alongside with Hades, is the Main Protagonist in the webtoon comic "Lore Oympus" by Rachel Smythe.

== In games ==
- Persephone is a supporting character in the game series Hades by Supergiant Games.
- Persephone is the main antagonist in God of War: Chains of Olympus, and is again referenced by Hades in God of War III.

== In music ==
- The musical Mythic is a modern-day pop rendition of the myth
- Allison Russell's first solo album, Outside Child, features a single titled “Persephone.”
- Anaïs Mitchell's musical Hadestown is a retelling of Orpheus and Eurydice with a jazz- and folk-influenced score, and Persephone and Hades are major characters.

== Planets beyond Neptune ==
When a 10th 'planet' was discovered in July 2005, a poll in New Scientist magazine picked Persephone as the public's favourite name. Its status as a planet was later downgraded to dwarf planet together with Pluto and was given the name Eris. Before that, the name was often used in science fiction to refer to hypothetical planets beyond Neptune and Pluto (such as Planet X and even Planet Nine, theorized in 2016).
