= Volodymyr Yermolenko =

Ukrainian philosopher, analyst and journalist

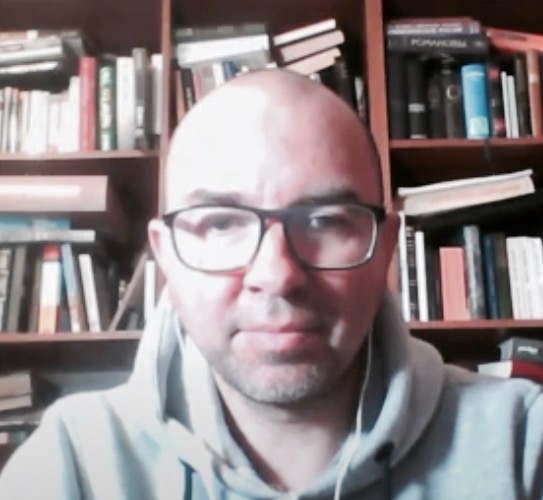
- Born: 1980 (age 45–46)
- Occupation: Philosopher

Volodymyr Yermolenko (Володимир Анатолійович Єрмоленко; born 1980) is a Ukrainian philosopher, essayist, translator, doctor of political studies (School of Advanced Studies in Social Sciences: EHESS, Paris), candidate of philosophical sciences (Kyiv, 2009), and senior lecturer at the Kyiv-Mohyla Academy. He is laureate of the Yurii Sheveliov Prize (2018) and of the Petro Mohyla Award (2021).

== Biography ==
Yermolenko was born Kyiv to a family of philosophers. His father, Anatolii Yermolenko, was director of the Institute of Philosophy. His mother taught philosophy at Kyiv Polytechnic Institute. He wrote his first philosophical work, "Buddhism and Western Culture", at the age of 15 for the Minor Academy of Sciences

In 2002, Yermolenko graduated from NaUKMA, and in 2003 from the Central European University in Budapest. In 2011, he defended his doctoral thesis at the School of Advanced Studies in Social Sciences (EHESS, Paris). He teaches at the Kyiv-Mohyla Academy.

In 2020, together with Tetiana Oharkova, Yermolenko started the Kult podcast, dedicated to defining epochs in the history of culture and cult authors who had a great influence on the development of literature and culture.

Since November 2022 Yermolenko has served as president of PEN Ukraine.

In December 2024, he started the philosophical podcast Thinking in Dark Times.

== Prizes ==
- 2018, Yurii Sheveliov Prize for Fluid Ideologies
- 2018, "Book of the Year" in 2 nominations, for Fluid Ideologies.
- 2021, Petro Mohyla Prize: for Fluid Ideologies

== Books ==
- The Storyteller and Philosopher Walter Benjamin and His Time, Krytyka, Ukrainian Scientific Institute of Harvard University, 2011
- Distant Relatives, Krytyka, Kyiv-Mohyla Academy, 2015
- Ocean Catcher: The Story of Odysseus, Stary Lev, 2017.
- Fluid ideologies. Ideas and Politics in Europe in the 19th and 20th Centuries, 2018.

== Publications ==
- Оповідач і філософ: Вальтер Беньямін та його час / В. Єрмоленко. — Київ: Критика, 2011. — 280 с.
- Далекі близькі. Есеї з філософії та літератури / В. Єрмоленко. — Львів: Видавництво Старого Лева, 2015. — 304 с.
- Ловець океану: Історія Одіссея / В. Єрмоленко. — Львів: Видавництво Старого Лева, 2017. — 216 с.
- «Плинні ідеології. Ідеї та політика в Європі ХІХ–ХХ століть»/ В.Єрмоленко — К.: ДУХ I ЛIТЕРА, 2018. — 480 с
- From Pushkin to Putin: Russian Literature’s Imperial Ideology - Foreign Policy 25 June 2022
