= Jason in popular culture =

The following is a list of depictions of Jason of the Argonauts, an ancient Greek mythological hero, in popular culture.

== Audio ==
- "Jason and the Argonauts" is the title of a track on XTC's 1982 album, English Settlement.
- "Birdhouse In Your Soul", a 1990 single from the They Might Be Giants album Flood, features references to Jason and the Argonauts.
- In 2001, a radio drama adaptation of Apollonius' Argonautica, was produced by the Radio Tales series for National Public Radio.
- Hip-hop duo Hermit and the Recluse (composed of rapper Ka and producer Animoss) released a 2018 album titled Orpheus vs. the Sirens, which utilizes mythical imagery from several episodes of the Argonauts' voyage.

== Literature ==
- William Morris wrote an English epic poem, The Life and Death of Jason, published in 1867.
- Padraic Colum wrote an adaptation for children, The Golden Fleece and the Heroes Who Lived Before Achilles, illustrated by Willy Pogany and published in 1921.
- "Jason's Voyage" is the title of Book Five of Thomas Wolfe's autobiographical 1935 novel Of Time and the River.
- The Golden Fleece (1944 UK version; aka Hercules, My Shipmate, 1945 US version) written by Robert Graves, is a somewhat humorous account of Jason and the Argonauts. Graves sometimes gives "natural" explanations to some of the myths. At other times he includes new myths of his own.
- The novel Jason (1961) by Henry Treece is narrated by Jason himself. The supernatural elements are largely removed, but a major theme of the book is the clash between the older religion of the mother goddess, favoured by women (who are portrayed as dangerous and hostile to men in many ways) and the newer religion of Zeus and Poseidon favoured by men.
- In comics, outside of a comic book adaptation of the film Jason and the Argonauts published by Dell Comics in 1963 as part of their Movie Classics series, and a 1963 issue of Classics Illustrated published only in the U.K. by Thorpe & Porter, there were two series that featured Jason and The Argonauts. The first was a 5 issue series published by Caliber Press in 1991, while the other was a series called Jason and the Argonauts: Kingdom of Hades, a 5 issue mini-series, published by Bluewater Comics in 2007. In 2011, Campfire Books published a graphic novel called Jason and the Argonauts written by Dan Whitehead.

== Stage ==
- Giasone is an opera in three acts and a prologue with music by Francesco Cavalli and a libretto by Giacinto Andrea Cicognini. It was premiered at the Teatro San Cassiano, Venice on 5 January 1649.
- Médée is an opera based on the Euripides play and the Pierre Corneille play. It was composed by Luigi Cherubini and premiered in 1797. It was a famous success for the Greek soprano Maria Callas as Medea and also featuring tenor Jon Vickers in the role of Jason.
- Mary Zimmerman wrote and directed Argonautika, which premiered in 2006 with the Chicago Lookingglass Theatre Company. It tells the story of Jason and the Argonauts from Pelias' initial charge through Jason's betrayal of Medea.
- Euripides wrote the play Medea, which depicts Medea killing Jason's bride and their two children. This play has nine characters and a chorus role.

== Television and film ==
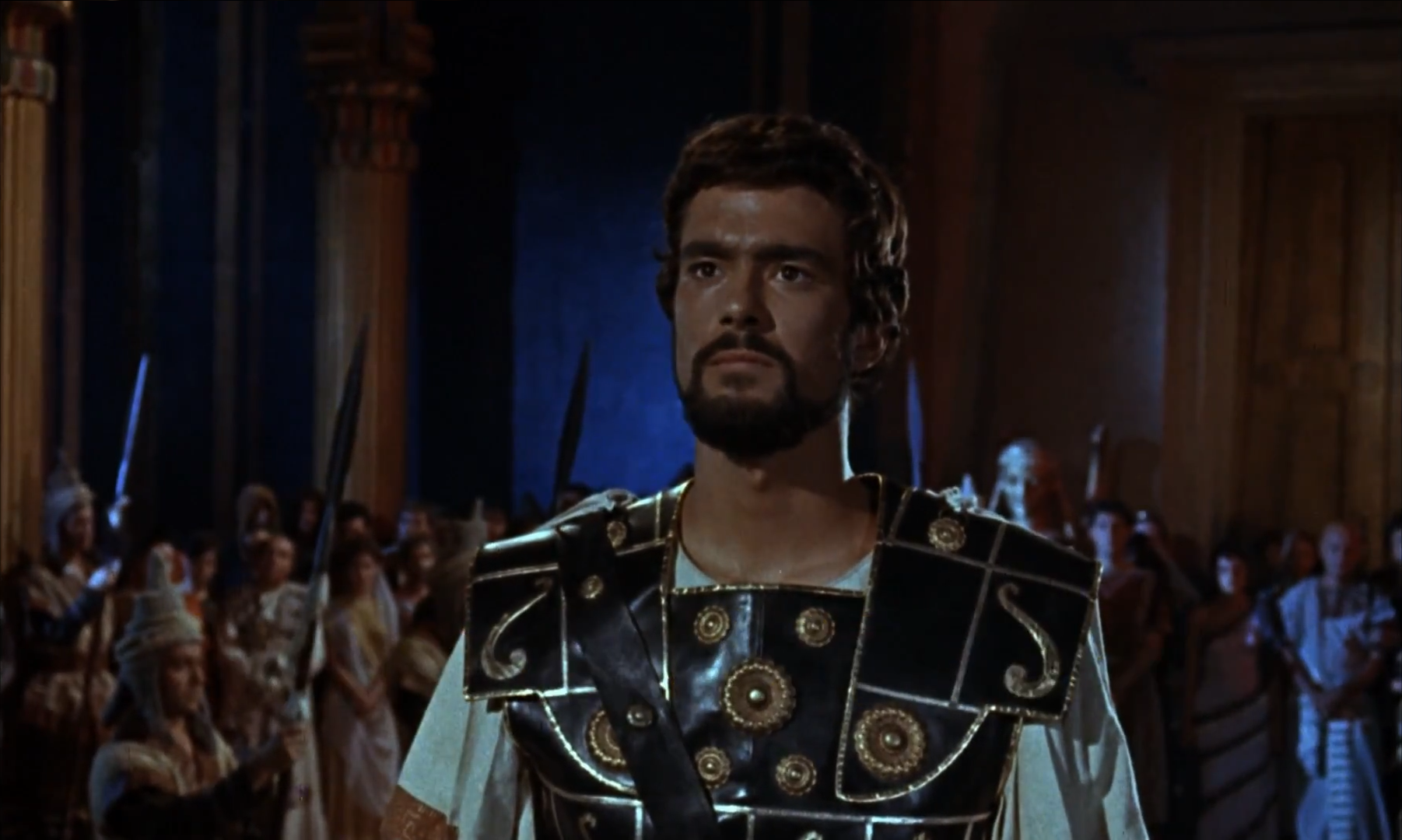
Jason portrayed by Todd Armstrong in Jason and the Argonauts (1963).

- The 1958 Italian production of Hercules starring Fabrizio Mioni as Jason.
- The 1960 Italian-French film, The Giants of Thessaly, is loosely based on the epic poem Argonautica by Apollonius Rhodius. Jason is played by Roland Carey.
- Jason and the Argonauts (1963) starred Todd Armstrong as Jason.
- Lars Von Trier's made for TV movie entitled Medea (1988) depicts Udo Kier as Jason after he has retrieved the Golden Fleece.
- Jason is played by Jeffrey Thomas on Hercules: The Legendary Journeys (1995-1999) and in flashback episodes and in Young Hercules (1998-1999) by Chris Conrad.
- Jason and the Argonauts (2000), a Hallmark TV movie, starring Jason London as Jason.
- "Jason and the Golden Fleece," episode 4 of the 2005 documentary, In Search of Myths and Heroes by Michael Wood, explores the Jason myth.
- Episode 2 of the 2008 TV series Age of the Gods: Journeys Edition, titled "Jason", is based on the myth of Jason and relates the stories of King Pelias, the Argonauts, the Isles of Lemnos, Phineus and the Harpies, the Symplegades, Medea, the Iron Bulls and Sown Men, the Golden Fleece, the Betrayal of Medea, and the Death of Jason.
- Jason is played by Zurab Kipshidze in the 1986 Soviet TV movie Argonavtebi (Веселая хроника опасного путешествия)
- Jason is portrayed in the BBC One series Atlantis (2013-2015) by Jack Donnelly. In the series, he was born in Atlantis but emigrated to the world of the 21st Century with his father when he was a child.
- Jason is voiced by William Shatner in Disney's Hercules: The Animated Series (1998) in a performance parodying Star Trek's Captain Kirk.

== Video games ==
- In the Age of Empires (1997), Jason featured as a khopesh swordsman and an axeman.
- Jason is a playable character in Herc's Adventures (1997).
- Jason is one of the heroes in the 2002 Age of Mythology.
- Jason is briefly featured in the 2007 video game God of War II. He has taken the Argonauts to the Isle of Creation, and has made it as far as Euryale's temple, where they were overcome by a cursed Cerberus. As Kratos walks into the monster's dungeon, Jason has been eaten alive and the Golden Fleece is hanging out of the creature's jaws. After Kratos kills the Cerberus, he takes the Golden Fleece, which is interpreted as a golden arm-long gauntlet, as his own, which becomes a permanent addition to his character throughout the rest of God of War II and all of God of War III.
- Codemasters released Rise of the Argonauts, an action role-playing video game developed by Liquid Entertainment, in 2008. The game was loosely based on the mythology, telling a new version of Jason's search for the Golden Fleece with many changes to both characters and events.
- Jason is an antagonist of the Okeanos singularity in Fate/Grand Order. During the game's 4th Anniversary Event in 2019, he was added as a 1-star Saber Servant alongside other Bronze Servants.
