= Luc Ferry =

French politician and philosopher

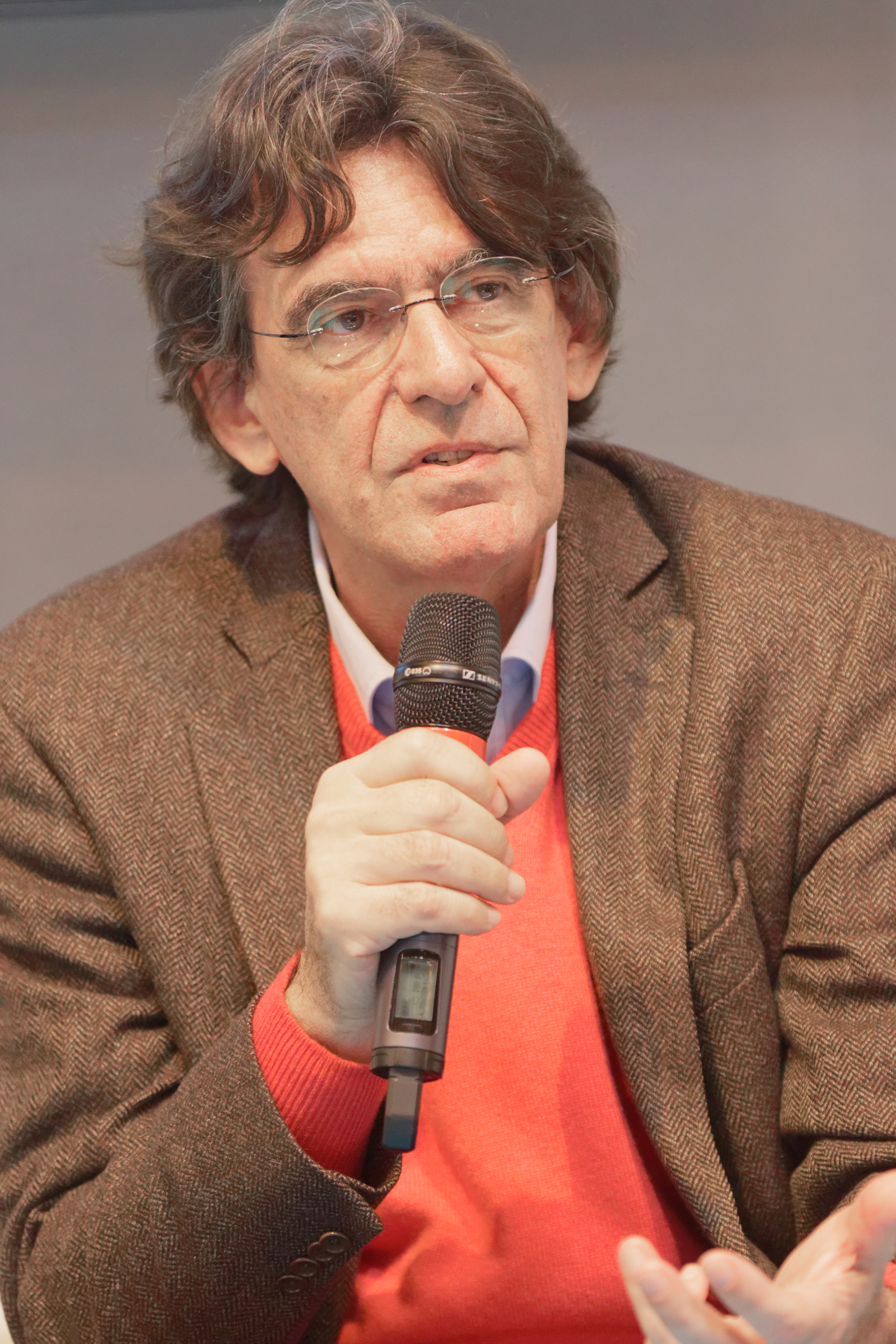

Minister for Youth, National Education and Research
- In office 7 May 2002 – 31 March 2004
- President: Jacques Chirac
- Prime Minister: Jean-Pierre Raffarin
- Preceded by: Jack Lang
- Succeeded by: François Fillon

Personal details
- Born: 3 January 1951 (age 75) Colombes, France
- Party: UMP
- Education: University of Paris 1 Pantheon-Sorbonne; Heidelberg University
- Profession: Philosopher

Luc Ferry (French: [fɛʁi]; born 3 January 1951) is a French public intellectual and voluminous author, who is a proponent of secular humanism. He was Minister of National Education for two years during the presidency of Jacques Chirac.

== Biography ==
He received an Agrégation de philosophie (1975), a Doctorate in Political science (1981), and an Agrégation in political science (1982). As a professor of political science and political philosophy, Luc Ferry taught at the Institut d'études politiques de Lyon (1982–1988)—during which time he also taught and directed graduate research at the University of Paris 1 Pantheon-Sorbonne—, then at the University of Caen (1989–96). He was finally a professor at Paris Diderot University from 1996 until he resigned in 2011 when asked to actually teach there.

From 2002 until 2004 he served as the Minister of Education on the cabinet led by the conservative Prime Minister of France Jean-Pierre Raffarin. During his tenure, he was the minister in charge of the implementation of the French law on secularity and conspicuous religious symbols in schools.

Ferry is the creator of the comic book series La Sagesse des mythes which is based on Greek mythology and has been published since 2016.

Despite repeated efforts, Ferry was rejected for the third time by the Académie Française in January 2019.

=== Works ===
- La pensée '68 (1985) [translated as French Philosophy of the 60s]
- Homo Aestheticus (1990)
- The New Ecological Order (1992)
- Rights: The New Quarrel Between the Ancients and the Moderns
- Man Made God: The Meaning of Life (1992)
- The Wisdom of the Moderns (1998)
- Political Philosophy
- Why We Are Not Nietzscheans, editor with Alain Renaut
- Qu'est-ce qu'une vie reussie?, (2002) Editions Grasset & Fasquelle
- Le religieux après la religion (2004) with Marcel Gauchet
- Apprendre à vivre (2006)
- Vaincre les peurs. La philosophie comme amour de la sagesse,(2006), éditions Odile Jacob.
- Kant. Une lecture des trois Critiques, (2006), éditions Grasset.
- Familles, je vous aime : Politique et vie privée à l'âge de la mondialisation,(2007), XO Editions.
- La tentation du christianisme with Lucien Jerphagnon, (2009), éditions Grasset.
- La Révolution de l'amour (2010), Plon.
- A Brief History of Thought: A Philosophical Guide to Living (2011)
- On Love: A Philosophy for the Twenty-first Century (2012)
- The Wisdom of the Myths: How Greek Mythology Can Change Your Life (2014)
- La Révolution Transhumaniste. Comment la technomédecine et l'ubérisation du monde vont bouleverser nos vies (2016), Plon.

=== Awards ===
Ferry received the award of Doctor honoris causa from the Université de Sherbrooke (Canada). He is the 2013 Telesio Galilei Academy of Science Laureate for Philosophy. He was created Chevalier (Knight) of the Bacchanalian fraternity De La Dive Bouteille De Gaillac on 20 March 2012 together with French mathematician Max Karoubi and Italian philosopher Francesco Fucilla.

== Controversies ==
It has been argued that only Ferry's position as Minister of Education from 2002 to 2004 can explain how he was able, subsequently, to secure state subventions to support his for-profit book Apprendre à vivre (2006).

In June 2011, Ferry announced on television that he knew about a former government minister who had sexually abused young boys in an orgy in Morocco. According to him, the case was known at the highest levels of the French state, but he provided no specifics as to the person involved, citing the risk of being sued for libel. A criminal investigation was then opened, and he was asked to cooperate with the prosecutors.

In June 2011, Le Canard enchaîné, Le Monde and other media revealed that Ferry, a professor at Paris Diderot University since 1996 (or 1997, depending on sources) had not ever taught there—when he was minister, he was on leave, and when not on leave his obligation to teach was waived in order for him to undertake other official duties. Some of those came with compensation pay, while he was still paid as a professor. In 2010, however, a change in legislation (introduced by minister Valérie Pécresse) made the university financially autonomous. It did not want to have professors on its payroll who did not teach, which may have made its president liable for misuse of public funds; it then required Ferry to do his allocated teaching share, which he declined to do. In 2011, according to some sources, the university was threatening to get him to refund his salary (€4,500 per month).

As a humanist, Ferry is highly critical of animal rights, deep ecology and environmentalism which he dismisses for elevating the moral status of nature.

In the yellow vests protests in 2019, Ferry suggested that the police should shoot to kill protesters.

Political offices
Preceded by Jack Lang	Minister of National Education; 2002-2004	Succeeded by François Fillon
