= Hephaestus in popular culture =

Hephaestus' (or Vulcan's) appearances in popular culture include the following.

== Film and television ==
- Hephaestus appears in the Pastoral Symphony segment of the 1940 Disney film Fantasia. He is shown forging thunderbolts for Zeus to throw at Dionysus. While Zeus retains his Greek name, Hephaestus and Dionysus are referred to by their Roman names, Vulcan and Bacchus.
- Hephaestus appears briefly in the Clash of the Titans (1981), portrayed by Pat Roach.
- Vulcan (at his forge in Mount Etna) was visited by German adventurer Baron Munchausen in the stories of Rudolph Erich Raspe. This story was featured in the 1988 film The Adventures of Baron Munchausen by Terry Gilliam, with Oliver Reed as Vulcan.
- Hephaestus appeared in the 1997 Disney movie, Hercules and the animated series (1998-1999) based on it, as one of the gods upon Mount Olympus and the brother of Hercules. He is shown to be engaged to Aphrodite and hates it when Hades flirts with her.
- Hephaestus appears in several episodes of the TV series Hercules: The Legendary Journeys (1996-1998), Young Hercules (1998) and Xena: Warrior Princess (1996-2000). He is portrayed by the actors Julian Garner and Jason Hoyte.
- In the 2000-2004 series Andromeda, the Battle of Hephaistos was the opening battle in First Systems Commonwealth Civil War against the Systems Commonwealth. The spaceship Andromeda Ascendant ended up trapped on the edge of the event horizon of a black hole for over 300 years. These events formed the basis of many events portrayed throughout the series.
- Hephaestus appears in the Justice League Unlimited episode "Hawk and Dove" (2005), voiced by Ed Asner.
- In the 2012 film Wrath of the Titans, Hephaestus is played by Bill Nighy. He is, in the film, credited with the creation of Tartarus and the forging of the weapons of the gods.
- Hephaestus, as Vulcan, appears in the American Gods episode "A Murder of Gods" (2017), portrayed by Corbin Bernsen.
- Hephaestus appears in the Percy Jackson and the Olympians episode "A God Buys Us Cheeseburgers" (2024), portrayed by Timothy Omundson.

== Games ==
- Hephaestus appears in Tomb Raider Anniversary, a 2007 remake of the first Tomb Raider game as one of two Greek gods represented in the trial chambers of St. Francis' Folly, the first level set in Greece. His trial chamber has a giant forging hammer that Lara must use, dodge and climb upon to solve a puzzle, which replaced Thor's hammer in the original game due to the said deity not being part of Greek mythology.
- Hephaestus appears in God of War III (2010), voiced by actor Rip Torn. He assists protagonist Kratos by providing him with new weapons, the electrically based Nemesis Whip, but betrays Kratos and in turn is killed by him in an attempt to keep him away from his created daughter Pandora. He also created the weapon, the Gauntlet of Zeus, that appears in the 2008 video game God of War: Chains of Olympus. In the God of War novel (2010), it is revealed that he created Kratos' Blades of Chaos in Tartarus (the original video game only said that Ares had them forged in Tartarus but did not state who forged them).
- A character named Hephaistos appears in Final Fantasy XIV (2013) as a member of an ancient race. His goal is to revive Athena, who is the ex-wife of his alternate personality Lahabrea. He has the ability to grow his feet and hands to large sizes.
- In the video game Smite (2014) Hephaestus appears in-game under his Roman name Vulcan; he is a playable god whose role is a mage. He also has a prosthetic left leg and right hand, in reference to both his lameness from mythology and his own ingenuity and peerless craftsmanship.
- Hephaestus appears in the mobile game app Tokyo Afterschool Summoners (2016) as member of Kamata Crafters' Guild, appearing officially at Chapter 9 along with his creation and Sacred Artifact, the automata Talos.
- In the 2017 role playing game Horizon Zero Dawn Hephaestus is the name given to one of the AIs used to terraform a future Earth. It is responsible for the creation of robots and machines. It also serves as a minor antagonist. Hephaestus also appears in the sequel, Horizon Forbidden West (2022).
- Hephaestus is mentioned in Ubisoft‘s ancient Greek-themed video game Assassin's Creed Odyssey (2018).
- Hephaestus is a major character in Ubisoft's Greek Mythology themed video game Immortals Fenyx Rising (2020).
- Hephaestus appears as one of the Greek gods in the video game Hades 2 (2025). He is portrayed as having a prosthetic leg and sitting in a wheelchair which he presumably forged.

== Literature ==
- Hephaestus appears in W. H. Auden's poem The Shield of Achilles (1952).
- Hephaestus participates in a story science fiction duology Ilium/Olympos (2003/2005) by Dan Simmons.
- In John C. Wright's Titans of Chaos (2005-2007), Hephaestus (Mulciber) is one of the powerful gods who attends the conference on what to do with the children; he offers Amelia a job as part of their plan to split the children up.
- Hephaestus appears in the fourth book in the Percy Jackson and the Olympians series, The Battle of the Labyrinth (2008), and in the first book in the Heroes of Olympus series, The Lost Hero (2010), as the father of Leo Valdez. In these series, his workshop is shown to have moved from Mount Aetna to Mount St. Helens.
- Hephaestus is a main character in the novel The Automation (2014) by B.L.A. and G. B. Gabbler. The other characters also call him Vulcan on occasion.
- Hephaestus appears in the book Lovely War (2019) by Julie Berry.
- In Homestuck Hephaestus is the denizen, a sort of final boss, in Land of Heat and Clockwork.
- A female version of Hephaestus appears in the light novel Is It Wrong to Try to Pick Up Girls in a Dungeon? as the leader of the smith familia.
- In David Weber's Honorverse, Hephaestus is the name of the Star Kingdom of Manticore's primary orbital warship construction and repair platform.

== Other ==
- Vulcan appears in Constantino Brumidi's The Apotheosis of Washington (1865), producing a cannon and a steam engine.
- In 2018, the band Warkings released a song called "Hephaistos" on their debut album Reborn. The song is about the god Hephaestos.
- In the audio drama Wolf 359, the U.S.S. Hephaestus is a space station run by an artificially intelligent "mother program" named Hera.
- Hephaestus appears in a segment of the song "God Games" by Jorge Rivera-Herrans. "God Games" is part of Epic: The Musical, a concept album written by Rivera-Herrans.
