= La Sagesse des mythes =

French comic book series

- Created by: Luc Ferry

Publication information
- Publisher: Glénat Editions
- Original language: French
- Genre: Greek mythology
- Publication date: 14 September 2016 -

Creative team
- Writer(s): Luc Ferry; Clotilde Bruneau
- Artist(s): various Didier Poli (artistic director); Frédéric Vignaux (cover art)
- Letterer(s): Maximilien Chailleux

La Sagesse des mythes (lit. 'The Wisdom of Myths') is a series of French comic books that retell famous myths. The series was created by the philosopher Luc Ferry and is published by Glénat Editions since 2016. It was originally exclusively based on Greek mythology but has included other stories since 2019.

== Creation ==
The philosopher Luc Ferry used the title La Sagesse des mythes for a 2008 book where he argued for the relevance of Greek myths in the contemporary world. It was published in English in 2014 as The Wisdom of the Myths.

The idea to make a comic-book series came from the desire to provide the latest scholarship about Greek mythology in a popular form, as Ferry thought that popular presentations of the stories usually contain many errors. He initiated the project in collaboration with the publishing house Glénat Editions, based on Grenoble. At the launch of the project in 2016, 30 volumes were at the planning stage. Beginning with a three-part adaptation of the Epic of Gilgamesh, of which the first volume was published in November 2019, the series has included some stories from outside of Greek mythology.

Ferry's interpretations and retellings of the myths are influenced by Timothy Gantz and Jean-Pierre Vernant. All the stories are written by Ferry, who writes around 30 pages for each album, which Clotilde Bruneau turns into manuscripts. The artistic director for the whole series is Didier Poli and the cover art is created by Frédéric Vignaux. The images are drawn in the ligne claire style and the colour scheme is intended to use colours associated with ancient Greece. The artists for the individual albums are chosen by Poli and Glénat's editorial director Benoît Cousin.

== Volumes ==
Title English translation	Art	Colour	Publication date	ISBN
L'Illiade 1/3: La Pomme de discorde The Iliad 1/3: The Apple of Discord	Pierre Taranzano	Stambecco	14 September 2016	ISBN 978-2-344-00166-0
Prométhée et la boîte de Pandore; Prometheus and Pandora's Box	Giuseppe Baiguera	Simon Champelovier	14 September 2016	ISBN 978-2-344-00164-6
Thésée et le Minotaure; Theseus and the Minotaur	Mauro De Luca	Elvire de Cock	2 November 2016	ISBN 978-2-344-00170-7
Jason et la toison d'or 1/3: Premières armes Jason and the Golden Fleece 1/3: First Weapons	Alexandre Jubran	Scarlett Smulkowski	2 November 2016	ISBN 978-2-344-00168-4
Persée et la Gorgone Méduse; Perseus and the Gorgon Medusa	Giovanni Lorusso	Stambecco	8 March 2017	ISBN 978-2-344-00169-1
Héraclès 1/3: La Jeunesse du Héros; Heracles 1/3: The Hero's Youth	Annabel Blusseau	Chiara Zeppegno; Arancia Studio	8 March 2017	ISBN 978-2-344-00167-7
L'Odyssée 1/4: La Colère de Poséidon; The Odyssey 1/4: Poseidon's Wrath	Giovanni Lorusso	Scarlett Smulkowski	13 September 2017	ISBN 978-2-344-00165-3
L'Illiade 2/3: La Guerre des Dieux; The Iliad 2/3: The War of the Gods	Pierre Taranzano	Stambecco	13 September 2017	ISBN 978-2-344-01193-5
Antigone; Antigone	Giuseppe Baiguera	Ruby	8 November 2017	ISBN 978-2-344-01259-8
La Naissance des Dieux; The Birth of the Gods	Dim. D Federico Santagati	Scarlett Smulkowski	8 November 2017	ISBN 978-2-344-00163-9
Jason et la toison d'or 2/3: Le Voyage de l'Argo; Jason and the Golden Fleece 2/3: The Voyage of the Argo	Alexandre Jubran	Scarlett Smulkowski	30 May 2018	ISBN 978-2-7234-9953-8
Œdipe; Oedipus	Diego Oddi	Ruby	30 May 2018	ISBN 978-2-344-01222-2
L'Illiade 3/3: La Chute de Troie; The Iliad 3/3: The Fall of Troy	Pierre Taranzano	Stambecco	19 September 2018	ISBN 978-2-344-02064-7
Dédale et Icare; Daedalus and Icarus	Giulia Pellegrini	Chiara Zeppegno; Arancia Studio	19 September 2018	ISBN 978-2-344-01419-6
Les Mésaventures du Roi Midas; The Misadventures of King Midas	Stefano Garau	Ruby	14 November 2018	ISBN 978-2-344-01076-1
L'Illiade: Coffret Tomes 01 à 03; The Iliad: Box Set Volumes 1 to 3	Pierre Taranzano	Stambecco	21 November 2018	ISBN 978-2-344-03185-8
Jason et la toison d'or 3/3: Les Maléfices de Médée; Jason and the Golden Fleece 3/3: The Wicked Spells of Medea	Alexandre Jubran	Scarlett Smulkowski	3 April 2019	ISBN 978-2-344-02387-7
Tantale et autres mythes de l'orgueil Tantalus and Other Myths of Pride	Carlos Rafael Duarte	Simon Champelovier	3 April 2019	ISBN 978-2-344-01423-3
Orphée et Eurydice; Orpheus and Eurydice	Diego Oddi	Ruby	5 June 2019	ISBN 978-2-344-01422-6
L'Odyssée 2/4: Circé la magicienne The Odyssey 2/4: Circe the Sorceress	Giuseppe Baiguera	Scarlett Smulkowski	4 September 2019	ISBN 978-2-344-01194-2
Héraclès 2/3: Les Douze travaux Heracles 2/3: The Twelve Labours	Carlos Rafael Duarte	Ruby	4 September 2019	ISBN 978-2-344-01192-8
Jason et la toison d'or: Coffret Tomes 01 à 03; Jason and the Golden Fleece: Box Set Volumes 1 to 3	Alexandre Jubran	Scarlett Smulkowski	13 November 2019	ISBN 978-2-344-03905-2
Gilgamesh 1/3: Les Frères ennemis Gilgamesh 1/3: The Enemy Brothers	Pierre Taranzano	Stambecco	13 November 2019	ISBN 978-2-344-02389-1
Eros et Psyché; Eros and Psyche	Diego Oddi	Ruby	13 November 2019	ISBN 978-2-344-01421-9
L'Odyssée 3/4: La Ruse de Pénélope; The Odyssey 3/4: The Cunning of Penelope	Giuseppe Baiguera	Scarlett Smulkowski	4 March 2020	ISBN 978-2-344-02254-2
Dionysos; Dionysus	Gianenrico Bonacorsi	Ruby	4 March 2020	ISBN 978-2-344-01420-2
Bellérophon et la chimère Bellerophon and the Chimera	Fabio Mantovani	Ruby	9 September 2020	ISBN 978-2-344-02385-3
Héraclès 3/3: L'Apothéose du demi-dieu Heracles 3/3: The Apotheosis of the Demigod	Carlos Rafael Duarte	Ruby	9 September 2020	ISBN 978-2-344-02338-9
Gilgamesh 2/3: La Fureur d'Ishtar; Gilgamesh 2/3: The Fury of Ishtar	Pierre Taranzano	Stambecco	25 November 2020	ISBN 978-2-344-02384-6
Héraclès: Coffret Tomes 01 à 03; Heracles: Box Set Volumes 1 to 3	Annabel Blusseau; Carlos Rafael Duarte	Chiara Zeppegno; Arancia Studio; Ruby	25 November 2020	ISBN 978-2-344-04491-9
L'Odyssée 4/4: Le Triomphe d'Ulysse; The Odyssey 4/4: The Triumph of Odysseus	Giuseppe Baiguera	Scarlett Smulkowski	25 November 2020	ISBN 978-2-331-04985-9
L'Odyssée: Coffret Tomes 01 à 04; The Odyssey: Box Set Volumes 1 to 4	Giuseppe Baiguera; Giovanni Lorusso	Scarlett Smulkowski	25 November 2020	ISBN 978-2-344-04516-9
Athéna; Athena	Carlos Rafael Duarte	Ruby	3 March 2021	ISBN 978-2-723-49955-2
Narcisse & Pygmalion; Narcissus & Pygmalion	Diego Oddi	Ruby	3 March 2021	ISBN 978-2-344-03841-3
Les Guerres de Zeus; The Wars of Zeus	Carlos Rafael Duarte		8 September 2021	ISBN 978-2-344-04086-7
Sisyphe & Asclépios; Sisyphus & Asclepius	Gianenrico Bonacorsi		8 September 2021	ISBN 978-2-344-03842-0
Apollon; Apollo	Luca Erbetta	Scarlett Smulkowski	1 December 2021	ISBN 978-2-344-04274-8
Les Enfers: Au royaume d'Hadès; The Underworld: In the Kingdom of Hades	Diego Oddi	Ruby	1 December 2021	ISBN 978-2-723-49954-5
Aphrodite 1/2: Née de l'écume Aphrodite 1/2: Born from the Foam	Giuseppe Baiguera	Scarlett Smulkowski	23 March 2022	ISBN 978-2-344-04396-7
Gilgamesh 3/3: La Quête de l'immortalité Gilgamesh 3/3: The Quest for Immortality	Pierre Taranzano	Filippo Rizzu	23 March 2022	ISBN 978-2-344-02386-0
Les Amours de Zeus; The Loves of Zeus	Carlos Rafael Duarte	Véronique Dorey	22 June 2022	ISBN 978-2-344-04085-0
Typhon; Typhon	Federico Santagati		28 September 2022	ISBN 978-2-344-01623-7
Aphrodite 2/2: Les Enfants de la déesse Aphrodite 2/2: The Children of the Goddess	Giuseppe Baiguera	Scarlett Smulkowski	9 November 2022	ISBN 978-2-344-04678-4
Roméo & Juliette; Romeo & Juliet	Gianenrico Bonacorsi		26 April 2023	ISBN 978-2-344-04885-6
Lancelot 1: Le Chevalier de la charrette Lancelot 1: The Knight of the Cart	Carlos Rafael Duarte		26 April 2023	ISBN 978-2-344-04884-9
Don Juan 1: L'Abuseur de Séville; Don Juan 1: The Abuser of Seville	Diego Oddi		20 September 2023	ISBN 978-2-344-04883-2
Adam et Ève; Adam and Eve	Gianenrico Bonacorsi	Jean-Luc Simon	20 September 2023	ISBN 978-2-344-04810-8
Lancelot 2: Le Pays de Gorre; Lancelot 2: The Land of Gorre	Carlos Rafael Duarte		2 November 2023	ISBN 978-2-344-05447-5
Carmen; Carmen	Gianenrico Bonacorsi		2 November 2023	ISBN 978-2-344-04886-3
Don Juan 2: L'Invité de pierre Don Juan 2: The Stone Guest	Diego Oddi		17 April 2024	ISBN 978-2-344-05446-8
L'Arche de Noé; Noah's Ark	Gianenrico Bonacorsi		17 April 2024	ISBN 978-2-344-04634-0
Lancelot 3: La Reine Guenièvre; Lancelot 3: Queen Guinevere	Carlos Rafael Duarte		4 September 2024	ISBN 978-2-344-05942-5
Tristan & Iseult 1: Le Château de Tintagel; Tristan and Iseult 1: The Castle of Tintagel	Giuseppe Baiguera		4 September 2024	ISBN 978-2-344-04812-2
La Belle au bois dormant The Sleeping Beauty in the Forest	Gianenrico Bonacorsi		13 November 2024	ISBN 978-2-344-06087-2
Yvain, le chevalier au lion 1: La Fontaine magique Yvain, the Knight of the Lion 1: The Magic Fountain	Diego Oddi		13 November 2024	ISBN 978-2-344-06077-3
Yvain, le chevalier au lion 2: Le Serment du preux Yvain, the Knight of the Lion 2: The Oath of the Valiant	Diego Oddi		9 April 2025	ISBN 978-2-344-06078-0
Lancelot 4: La ruse de Méléagant; Lancelot 4: The Cunning of Maleagant	Carlos Rafael Duarte		9 April 2025	ISBN 978-2-344-06349-1
Tristan & Iseult 2: La Blessure du Morholt; Tristan and Iseult 2: The Morholt's Wound	Giuseppe Baiguera		3 September 2025	ISBN 978-2-331-08870-4

Prométhée et la boîte de Pandore, Thésée et le Minotaure, Persée et la Gorgone Méduse, Antigone, La Naissance des dieux, Tantale et autres mythes de l'orgueil and Orphée et Eurydice have also been republished through the book club France Loisirs.
