= Madeline Miller =

American writer (born 1978)

- Miller in 2013
- Born: July 24, 1978 (age 48); Boston, Massachusetts, U.S.
- Education: Brown University (BA, MA); University of Chicago (attended); Yale University (attended)
- Writing career
- Notable works: The Song of Achilles; Circe
- Notable awards: Orange Prize for Fiction (2012)
- Website: Official website

Madeline Miller (born July 24, 1978) is an American novelist, author of The Song of Achilles (2011) and Circe (2018). Miller spent ten years writing The Song of Achilles while she worked as a teacher of Latin and Greek. The novel tells the story of the love between the mythological figures Achilles and Patroclus; it won the Orange Prize for Fiction, making Miller the fourth debut novelist to win the prize. She is a 2019 recipient of the Alex Awards.

== Early life and family ==
Miller was born on July 24, 1978, in Boston and grew up in New York City and Philadelphia. Miller attended Brown University, completing both a bachelor's and master's degree in classics (2000 and 2001, respectively). She started writing her first novel, The Song of Achilles, during the final year of her bachelor's after codirecting a production of Troilus and Cressida. She has said that the scene in the play that shows Patroclus' death sparked her interest in telling his story and pushed her to start writing. Prior to this moment, she already had a deep interest in Greek mythology and classics. Her mother, a librarian, started reading her The Iliad at five years old and she started learning Latin at 11.

As a little girl she had a keen fascination for Greek mythology. Growing up on the Upper East Side, she spent a lot of her time at the Metropolitan Museum of Art. One of her favorite warriors at the Met is a marble statue of a wounded Amazon warrior which has blood drops on the side of her breast.

After completing her degrees, Miller then went on to teach Latin, Greek, and Shakespeare to high school students. While working as a teacher, Miller continued work on her novel.

She later studied for a year at the University of Chicago's Committee on Social Thought working towards a PhD and from 2009 to 2010 at the Yale School of Drama for an MFA in dramaturgy and dramatic criticism.

She has discussed how long COVID has affected her life since a February 2020 COVID-19 infection. In an op-ed in The Washington Post in August 2023, she said that having had the disease for three years, she had regained the ability to write but her fatigue had worsened.

== Novels ==
=== The Song of Achilles ===
The Song of Achilles, Miller's debut novel, was released in September 2011. The book took her ten years to write. Set during the Greek Heroic Age, the novel tells the story from Patroclus' point of view and the bond that grew between him and Achilles.

The novel won many rewards and honors, including:

- The 17th annual Orange Prize for Fiction.
- New York Times Bestseller
- Massachusetts Must-Read of 2013; Finalist for the Mass Book Award
- Stonewall Honor Book, American Library Association
- Shortlisted for the UK Independent Bookseller Award
- Shortlisted for Stonewall's Writer of the Year
- Finalist for the Chautauqua Prize
- Semi-finalist for the VCU Cabell First Novelist Award

=== Circe ===
Circe, Miller's second novel, was released on April 10, 2018. The book is a modern reimagining told from the perspective of Circe, an enchantress in Greek mythology who is featured in Homer's Odyssey. Circe was ranked the second-greatest book of the 2010s by Paste. Tutor House ranked Circe in its top books for Classics students in 2021. An 8-part miniseries adaptation of the book has been green-lit for HBO Max. Rick Jaffa and Amanda Silver are set to write and produce the adaptation.

Miller was motivated to write Circe in part out of disappointment in the character's role in the Odyssey. She explained in an interview, “Odysseus has told his story for the last 3,000 years ... It was time for Circe to speak for herself.” Circe focuses on the titular character, with Odysseus only playing a minor role. Miller in Circe channels many feminist themes: rejection of patriarchal norms, empowerment, and self-reliance. Miller said that Circe is "a story about a woman coming into her power and into her voice in a world hostile to women in power and the female voice".

The novel won the following awards and honors:

- #1 New York Times Bestseller
- #1 Indie Bestseller
- Publishers Weekly *Starred* Review
- Library Journal *Starred* Review
- NPR's "Weekend Edition Saturday": Books to Look Forward in 2018
- Esquire: The 27 Most Anticipated Books of 2018
- Boston Globe: 25 Books We Can't Wait to Read in 2018
- The Millions: The Most Anticipated: The Great 2018 Book Review
- Cosmopolitan: 33 Books to Get Excited About in 2018
- Vox: Five New Books to Purchase This Spring
- The Guardian (UK): Unmissable Culture of 2018
- Southern Living: Best New Books Coming in Spring 2018
- Book Riot: Most Anticipated Books of 2018
- TOR: The Books We're Looking Forward to in 2018

=== Galatea ===
A short story originally released as an e-book in 2013. It was later released in hardback in March 2022. The novel is a retelling of the Greek myth Pygmalion from the perspective of the sculptor's statue.

=== Heracles' Bow ===
A short story contained within The Song of Achilles and published in a Waterstones Special edition of The Song of Achilles on August 7, 2012, Heracles' Bow takes from the perspective of Philoctetes, how he suffered his snake bite, and his abandonment by his companions. Much of the story takes place as a dialogue between Philoctetes and an imaginary Heracles, though other characters from The Song of Achilles also appear in it.

=== Persephone ===
In December 2021, Miller announced via an Instagram post that she was working on her new novel, about the goddess Persephone.

=== Mestra: A Short Story ===
In January 2026, Miller announced via an Instagram post the release of her latest fictional short story about the forgotten myth of Mestra.

== Inspiration ==
Miller is known for writing mythological realism. Miller's novels re-imagine stories from Greek mythology, while focusing on themes that she considers timeless, like dysfunctional families and homesickness. She has said that she finds relevance to retelling The Odyssey because it related to "universal human experiences." In an interview, Miller said that she sees genre as "permeable and changeable" but said that her books could be characterized as "either literary adaptation or mythological realism. Or just plain old fiction!". Miller has said though that her approach to the original material was quite different for her two novels. In The Song of Achilles, she took an existing story "hidden in the material already", and for Circe, she challenged the classic texts by taking out Odysseus's voice and replacing it with Circe's, a more "subversive retelling".

Homer has always been a guide for Miller. In reading the Iliad she wondered constantly about who the man in the shadows was. She noted in an interview with Women's Prize titled, "Archives: Q&A with Madeline Miller" that she took great inspiration to write The Song of Achilles after finishing directing her production of Troilus and Cressida. Her main concern for The Song of Achilles was Patroclus. The character of Patroclus came from Homer, but she used Homer as a guide to elaborate more on Patroclus and Achilles' characters. Patroclus' character was created by hints given from Homer: his gentleness and kindness.

Song plays a big role in The Song of Achilles. In the interview with Women's Prize, Miller notes how her knowledge of Achilles being a talented singer is what let her to include songs being significant in the novels. In addition to this, she goes on to note how the word Illiad literally means "The Song of Troy," hence giving her the idea for the book's title. Just how she grew up honoring the deities, warriors, and heroes of Ancient Greek mythology, she felt that she needed to honor the name Illiad in her novel.

Miller told a reporter from The Guardian that her inspirations include David Mitchell, Lorrie Moore, Anne Carson, and Virgil. Miller expressed "hate" and "visceral disgust" towards Ayn Rand's book The Fountainhead. As she herself indicated, she hates the "ideas behind it". Instead, she prefers books by James Herriot and Chinua Achebe.

== Awards ==
Year	Work	Award	Category	Result	Ref.
2012	The Song of Achilles	Orange Prize for Fiction	—	Won	
2013	The Song of Achilles	ALA Rainbow Book List	Young Adult/Crossover Fiction	Top Ten	
2013	The Song of Achilles	Chautauqua Prize	—	Shortlisted	
2013	The Song of Achilles	Gaylactic Spectrum Award	Novel	Won	
2013	The Song of Achilles	Independent Booksellers' Book Prize	—	Shortlisted	
2013	The Song of Achilles	Massachusetts Book Award	Must-Read	Longlisted	
2013	The Song of Achilles	RUSA CODES Reading List	Historical Fiction	Shortlisted	
2013	The Song of Achilles	Stonewall Book Award	Literature	Honor	
2018	Circe	Athenaeum Literary Award	—	Won	
2018	Circe	Goodreads Choice Awards	Fantasy	Won	
2018	Circe	Kitschies	Red Tentacle (Novel)	Won	
2018	Circe	Waterstones Book of the Year	—	Shortlisted	
2019	Circe	Andrew Carnegie Medals for Excellence	Fiction	Longlisted	
2019	Circe	Australian Book Industry Awards	International Book	Shortlisted	
2019	Circe	Books Are My Bag Readers' Awards	Fiction	Won	
2019	Circe	Books Are My Bag Readers' Awards	Beautiful Book	Shortlisted	
2019	Circe	Indies Choice Book Awards	Adult Fiction	Won	
2019	Circe	Joyce Carol Oates Literary Prize	—	Longlisted	
2019	Circe	Mythopoeic Awards	—	Shortlisted	
2019	Circe	RUSA CODES Reading List	Historical Fiction	Shortlisted	
2019	Circe	Women's Prize for Fiction	—	Shortlisted	
2020	Circe	International Dublin Literary Award	—	Longlisted	

== Published works ==
=== Novels ===
- —— (2011). The Song of Achilles. London: Bloomsbury. ISBN 9781408816035.
- —— (2018). Circe: A Novel. New York: Little, Brown and Company. ISBN 9780316556347.

Short novels

- (2022) Galatea. London: Bloomsbury. ISBN 978-1-5266-5206-5
- (2026) Mestra. London: Bloomsbury. ISBN 978-1-0372-0612-2

=== Other works ===
- From Circe to Clinton
- The Wily Wife
- Review of The Odyssey, translated by Emily Wilson
- Buddy Holly
- Writing at Six Miles an Hour
- Five Great Books Inspired by the Classics
- Wisteria and Sunshine
- Traveling to Troy
- Review of The Sweet Girl, by Annabel Lyon
- Learning to Love Adaptation
- Homer, My Hero
- In Praise of Literary Adaptations
