= Das Schweigen der Sirenen (Riehm) =

Opera and symphonic composition

- Opera by Rolf Riehm
- Language: German
- Based on: Kafka's short story "Das Schweigen der Sirenen"
- Premiere: 9 October 1994; Staatsoper Stuttgart

Das Schweigen der Sirenen
- Symphonic work with voices
- Scoring: soprano; tenor; orchestra

Premiere
- Date: 9 October 1994
- Location: Frankfurt

Das Schweigen der Sirenen (The Silence of the Sirens) is the title of two compositions by Rolf Riehm, based on Kafka's short story "Das Schweigen der Sirenen" which relates to the Greek myth of Odysseus, Circe and the Sirens.

Riehm composed a symphonic work with voices, premiered in Frankfurt on 9 February 1991, and an opera, premiered in Stuttgart on 9 October 1994. Both compositions were published by Casa Ricordi.

== History ==
=== Background ===
The composer Rolf Riehm used ancient myths in several of his compositions. The Greek myth of Odysseus, Circe and the Sirens is a frequent topic in his works, including the 2002 Fremdling rede - Ballade Furor Odysseus and the 2014 opera Sirenen. He used the text of Kafka's 1917 short story "Das Schweigen der Sirenen" in two works, a symphonic work with voices and an opera.

=== Symphonic work ===
Riehm composed Das Schweigen der Sirenen in 1987, a symphonic work with voices on a commission by the Alban Berg Foundation. It was published by Ricordi, dedicated to Thomas Jahn. The work of about 40 minutes was premiered on 9 February 1991 by Christine Whittlesey, Christer Bladin and the Radio Symphony Orchestra Frankfurt, conducted by Lothar Zagrosek.

=== Opera ===
Riehm wrote an opera Das Schweigen der Sirenen, based on Kafka's short story. It was published by Ricordi, dedicated to Hilde Riehm. premiered by the Staatsoper Stuttgart on 9 October 1994. It was staged by Christof Nel and conducted by Bernhard Kontarsky, with singers and actors including Susan Roberts, Urszula Koszut, Armin Dallapiccola, Gogo Hübner and Ulrich Mühe.

== Recording ==
The symponic work Das Schweigen der Sirenen was recorded by Christine Whittlesey, Christer Bladin and the Radio Symphony Orchestra Frankfurt, conducted by Lothar Zagrosek, taken from live recordings from the 1991 premiere and 1998, released in 2012.
