= Tanja Ariane Baumgartner =

German operatic mezzo-soprano

- Education: Hochschule für Musik Freiburg; Hochschule für Musik Karlsruhe
- Occupation: Operatic mezzo-soprano
- Organizations: Oper Frankfurt
- Website: tanjaarianebaumgartner.com

Tanja Ariane Baumgartner is a German operatic mezzo-soprano. A member of the Oper Frankfurt since 2009, she has enjoyed an international career, appearing in major European and American opera houses and the Salzburg Festival.

== Career ==
Baumgartner grew up in Rheinfelden, the daughter of a teacher who conducted several choirs. She first studied violin, graduating from the Hochschule für Musik Freiburg. She then studied voice at the Hochschule für Musik Karlsruhe and at the Musikhochschule Wien with Helena Lazarska. She was first engaged at the Lucerne Opera from 2002 to 2008 where she learned many roles of the mezzo-soprano repertoire, including Dorabella in Mozart's Così fan tutte, Charlotte in Massenet's Werther, Mrs. Quickly in Verdi's Falstaff, Giulietta in Offenbach's Les contes d'Hoffmann, and Baba the Turc in Stravinsky's The Rake's Progress. In 2008, she studied the title role of Othmar Schoeck's Penthesilea with Hans Neuenfels for the Basel Opera, a production that received the award Inszenierung des Jahres (production of the year) by Opernwelt.

Baumgartner has been a member of the ensemble of the Oper Frankfurt from the 2009/10 season, where her roles included Bizet's Carmen, Mary in Wagner's Der fliegende Holländer, Eboli in Verdi's Don Carlos, Lisa in Mieczysław Weinberg's The Passenger, the Nurse in Die Frau ohne Schatten by Richard Strauss, again Penthesilea and Fricka in Wagner's Der Ring des Nibelungen. She appeared as Circe in the world premiere of Rolf Riehm's Sirenen in 2014.

She made her debut at the Salzburg Festival in 2010 as Geschwitz in Alban Berg's Lulu, followed in 2012 by Charlotte in Bernd Alois Zimmermann's Die Soldaten, staged by Alvis Hermanis and conducted by Ingo Metzmacher. She appeared at the Hamburg Opera in the premiere of Beat Furrer's La bianca notte, and as Ortrud in Wagner's Lohengrin. Fricka was her role again for her debut at the Lyric Opera of Chicago.

She performed in 2017 in Frankfurt the role of Cassandre in Les Troyens by Berlioz, staged by Eva-Maria Höckmayr and conducted by John Nelson. A reviewer noted that her dramatic mezzo-soprano expressed both, the visionary close to madness and the sorrowful lover. Also in 2017, she appeared as Fricka at the Bayreuth Festival.

== Discography ==
=== Recitals & Orchestral Works ===
- Mahler's Das klagende Lied (CD, Capriccio 2017). Live recording from 1./2.12.2016 in the Konzerthaus Wien with Vienna Radio Symphony Orchestra, conducted by Cornelius Meister.
- Mahler's Second Symphony "Resurrection" (2 CD, DreyerGaido 2019). Recording from 2018 with Stuttgart Philharmonic, conducted by Gabriel Feltz.
- Pfitzner's Complete Songs, Vol. 3 - Die schlanke Wasserlilie, Weihnachtslied (CD, Naxos 2019).
- Trojahn's String Quartet No. 2 with clarinet & mezzo-soprano (CD, Wergo 2019).
- Schulhoff's Complete songs (3 CD, bastille musique 2020). Production of SWR and recorded in the Hans-Rosbaud-Studio Baden-Baden from 2016 to 2018. Its a complete recording of all 89 songs by Erwin Schulhoff – together with Sunhae Im, Britta Stallmeister (both soprano) and Hans Christoph Begemann (Baritone). This SWR-Project was initiated by Klaus Simon, who published the scores 2017 with Schott Music.

=== Opera ===
Following stage appearances were recorded and published on CD or DVD/ Blu-Ray:

- Reimann's Medea as Gora (2 CD, OehmsClassics 2011). Recording of the opening night on 5.9.2010 at Oper Frankfurt. Frankfurter Opern- und Museumsorchester, conducted by Erik Nielsen.
- Berg's Lulu as Countess Geschwitz (DVD, EuroArts 2012). Recorded 2010 during Salzburg Festival. Vienna Philharmonic, conducted by Marc Albrecht.
- Wagner's Die Walküre as Grimgerde (4 CD, OehmsClassics 2011). Recorded 2010 at Oper Frankfurt. Frankfurter Opern- und Museumsorchester, conducted by Sebastian Weigle.
- Wagner's Die Walküre as Grimgerde (DVD, OehmsClassics 2014). Recorded in June/ July 2012 at Oper Frankfurt. Frankfurter Opern- und Museumsorchester, conducted by Sebastian Weigle.
- Reimann's Die Soldaten as Charlotte (DVD/Blu-Ray, Unitel Edition 2013). Recorded 2012 during Salzburg Festival. Vienna Philharmonic, conducted by Ingo Metzmacher.
- Strauss' Die Frau ohne Schatten as Nurse (3 CD, OehmsClassics 2015). Recorded 2014 at Oper Frankfurt. Frankfurter Opern- und Museumsorchester, conducted by Sebastian Weigle.
- Handel's Serse as Amastre (DVD/Blu-Ray, C Major Entertainment 2018). Recorded 2010 in January 2017 at Oper Frankfurt. Frankfurter Opern- und Museumsorchester, conducted by Constantinos Carydis.
- Henze's The Bassardis as Agave/ Venus (DVD/Blu-Ray, Arthaus Musik 2019). Recorded 2018 during Salzburg Festival. Vienna Philharmonic, conducted by Kent Nagano.
- Strauss' Elektra as Klytaemnestra (DVD/Blu-Ray, Unitel Edition 2021). Recorded 2020 during Salzburg Festival. Vienna Philharmonic, conducted by Franz Welser-Möst.

=== Guest appearances ===
- "Love and Despair" by Andreas Bauer Kanabas (CD, OehmsClassics 2021). Recorded on 20.-22.6.2019 in the Great Concert Hall Riga with Latvian Festival Orchestra (LF), conducted by Karsten Januschke. Excerpt from Bartók's Bluebeard's Castle, op. 11, scene 48. Bluebeard and Judith. Door 7: “Lásd a régi asszonyokat”.
