= Christof Nel =

German director and theatre director (1944–2024)

- Nel in the 2010s
- Born: 7 April 1944; Stuttgart, Gau Württemberg-Hohenzollern, Germany
- Died: 6 August 2024 (aged 80)
- Occupations: Actor; Theatre director; Opera director
- Organizations: Schauspiel Frankfurt; Oper Frankfurt; Mannheim National Theatre; Akademie für Darstellende Kunst Baden-Württemberg

Christof Nel (7 April 1944 – 6 August 2024) was a German theatre and opera director. He began his career as an actor but moved on to direct opera productions at major opera houses. Plays that he directed were invited to the Berliner Theatertreffen, such as the world premiere of Thomas Brasch's Rotter in 1978 and Thomas Bernhard's Alte Meister in 1998. Nel directed the world premiere of Rolf Riehm's Das Schweigen der Sirenen at the Staatstheater Stuttgart in 1994. His works at Oper Frankfurt included Puccini's Madama Butterfly in 2001, Wagner's Tristan und Isolde in 2003 and the first production in German of Aulis Sallinen's Kullervo in 2011. He taught at the Akademie für Darstellende Kunst Baden-Württemberg from 2011 to 2022.

== Life and career ==
Nel was born in Stuttgart on 7 April 1944; his father was a violist and his mother a singer. He studied art history and theatre in Munich. He began his theatre career as an actor, engaged at the Schaubühne am Halleschen Ufer by Peter Stein. Nel began directing in the 1970s.

His first plays were produced at the Theater Köln, including the first performance in Germany of Occupations (Roter Sonntag in Turin) by Trevor Griffiths in 1973. He was successful in productions for the Schauspiel Frankfurt with Peter Palitzsch. Nel collaborated in interdisciplinary and experimental work with Heiner Goebbels and William Forsythe at the Theater am Turm in Frankfurt. Several of the plays he directed were invited to the Berliner Theatertreffen, such as the world premiere of Thomas Brasch's Rotter in a Frankfurt production in 1978, his production of Antigone by Sophocles/Hölderlin in 1979, and Thomas Bernhard's Alte Meister at Deutsches Schauspielhaus in Hamburg in 1998. Nel directed also in Berlin, at Theater Bochum and Theater Basel.

From the 1980s, Nel staged music theatre, among others at the Oper Frankfurt, where he directed Weber's Der Freischütz in 1983, Verdi's Falstaff and Smetana's Die verkaufte Braut both in 1985, and Wagner's Die Meistersinger von Nürnberg in 1993. He directed there Salome by Richard Strauss in 1999, Puccini's Madama Butterfly in 2001, Wagner's Tristan und Isolde in 2003 and Parsifal in 2006. He staged Die Frau ohne Schatten by Richard Strauss, and the first production in German of Aulis Sallinen's Kullervo in 2011.

Nel directed world premieres, of Rolf Riehm's Das Schweigen der Sirenen at the Staatstheater Stuttgart in 1994, and of Mauricio Kagel's TheaterKonzert at the Deutsche Oper am Rhein in Duisburg, as part of the 2003 Ruhrtriennale. Nel returned to Schauspiel Frankfurt in 2005 with a production of Bakchen by Euripides, collaborating with his wife, the psychologist Martina Jochem. He directed, often with her assistance, Offenbach's Hoffmanns Erzählungen at the Nationaltheater Mannheim, Verdi's Don Carlo at the Staatsoper Hannover, Elektra by Strauss at the Grand Théâtre de Genève, Verdi's Aida at the Bavarian State Opera, and Schoenberg's Moses und Aron at the Deutsche Oper am Rhein.

Nel taught at the Akademie für Darstellende Kunst Baden-Württemberg from 2011 to 2022, from 2012 to 2014 heading the department of direction. He taught as a guest in Essen and Hamburg, among others.

Nel died on 6 August 2024, at the age of 80.
