= Circe and Her Lovers in a Landscape =

Painting by Dosso Dossi

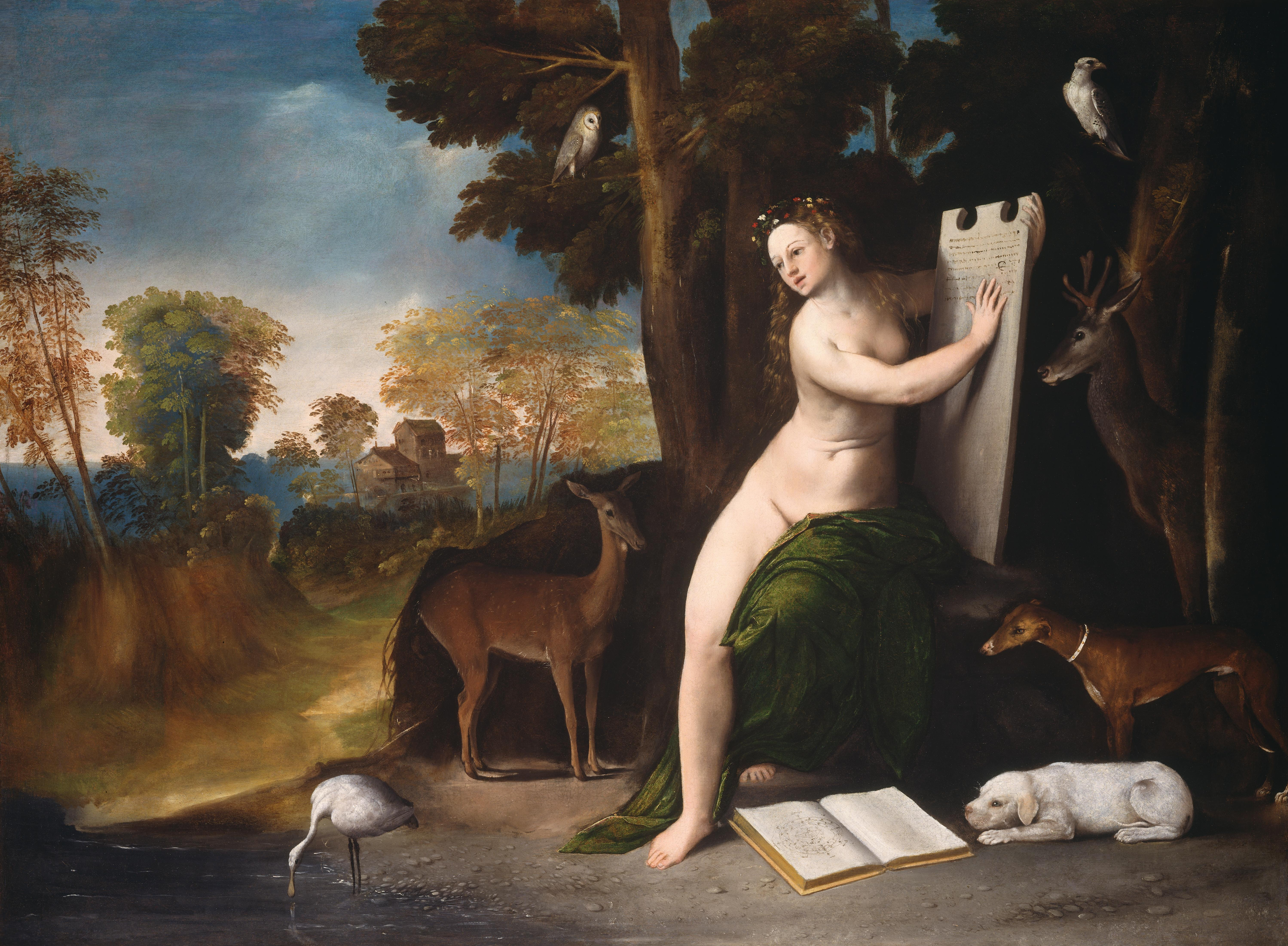
- Artist: Dosso Dossi
- Year: c. 1525
- Medium: Oil on canvas
- Dimensions: 100.8 cm × 136.1 cm (39.7 in × 53.6 in)
- Location: National Gallery of Art, Washington, D.C.
- Accession: 1943.4.49

Circe and Her Lovers in a Landscape is an oil painting by the Italian Renaissance painter Dosso Dossi. It is dated to about 1525. The painting is in the collection of the National Gallery of Art in Washington, D.C.

== Description ==
The sorceress Circe is represented crowned with flowers, half sitting, half standing, to left beneath a group of trees, and nude except for green drapery that falls over her left leg; she points to a stone tablet of laws held with her left arm. Around are her lovers changed to birds and beasts, a greyhound, a white puppy, a stag with horns in the velvet, a hawk, an owl, and a spoonbill. Her familiar hind stands before her, and at her feet is an open book of spells. Wooded landscape and buildings to the left, against a horizon flushed with light and blue sky.

== Analysis ==
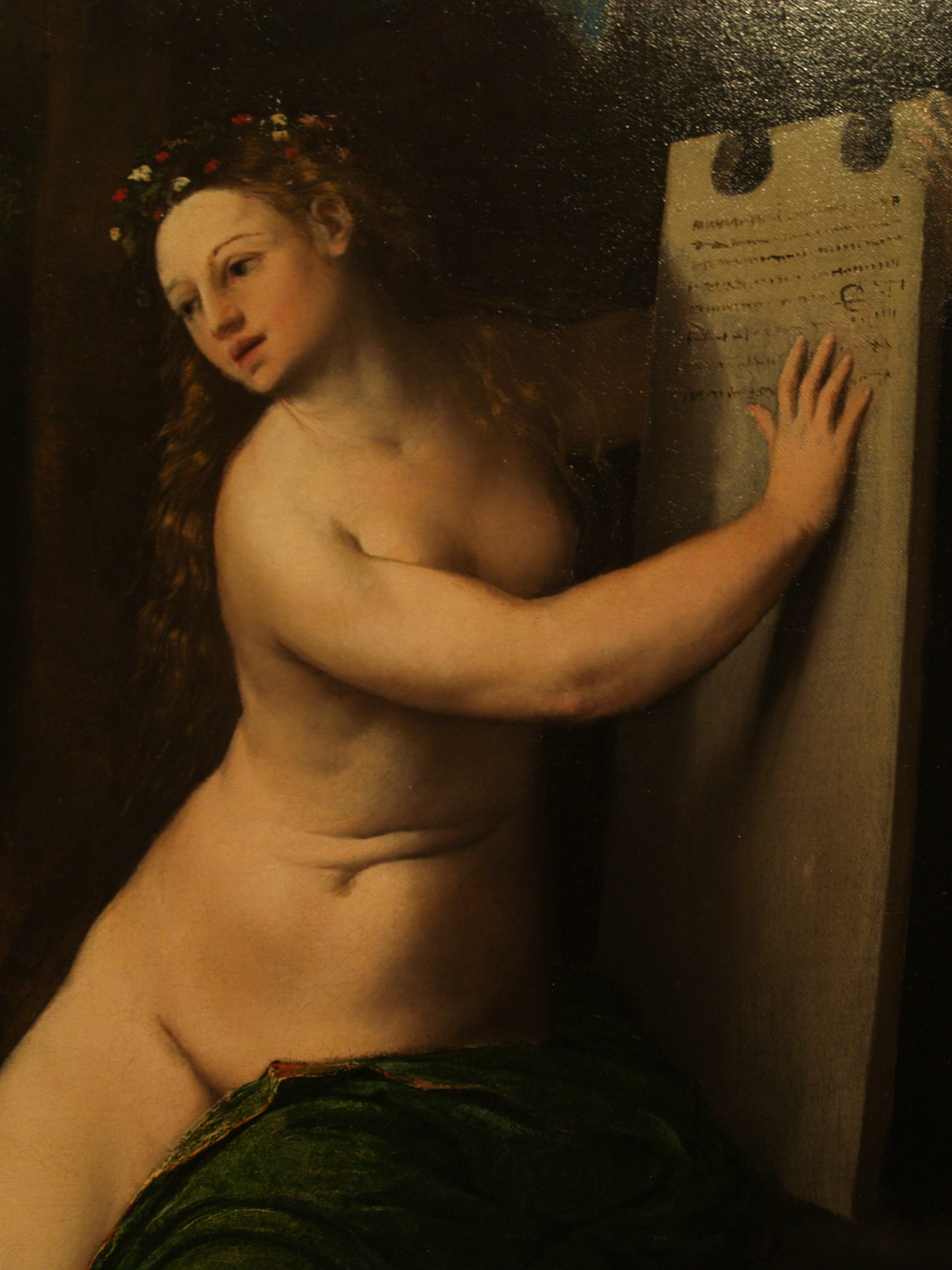
Circe (detail)

According to Robert Henry Benson, this is probably an early work painted under the inspiration of Giorgione and Titian. The same critic notes that the choice and treatment of the subject suggest a sense of humour in Dossi.

== Sources ==
- Benson, Robert Henry (1914). Catalogue of Italian Pictures at 16 South Street, Park Lane, London and Buckhurst in Sussex. London: Chiswick Press. pp. 115–116, no. 60.
