= Paavo Järvi =

Estonian conductor

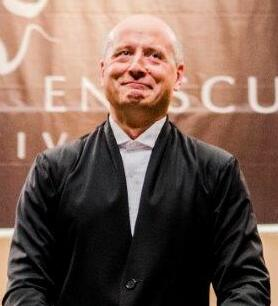
- Järvi in 2013
- Born: 30 December 1962 (age 63); Tallinn, then part of Estonian SSR, Soviet Union
- Occupation: Conductor
- Organizations: Cincinnati Symphony Orchestra; Deutsche Kammerphilharmonie Bremen; Frankfurt Radio Symphony; Tonhalle-Orchester Zürich
- Website: paavojarvi.com

Paavo Järvi (Estonian pronunciation: [ˈpɑːʋo ˈjærʋi]; born 30 December 1962) is an Estonian and American conductor. He currently serves as chief conductor and music director of the Tonhalle-Orchester Zürich, artistic director of the Deutsche Kammerphilharmonie Bremen and as founder and artistic director of the Estonian Festival Orchestra. In March 2026 he was announced as the next chief conductor and artistic advisor of the London Philharmonic Orchestra from the 2028/29 season.

== Early life ==
Järvi was born in Tallinn on 30 December 1962, Estonia to Liilia Järvi and the Estonian conductor Neeme Järvi. His siblings, Kristjan Järvi and Maarika Järvi, are also musicians. After leaving Estonia in 1980, the family settled in the United States. Järvi studied privately with Leonid Grin in Philadelphia, at the Curtis Institute of Music with Max Rudolf and Otto-Werner Mueller, and at the Los Angeles Philharmonic Institute with Leonard Bernstein.

Anton Bruckner: Symphony no. 3, third movement, excerpt from a 2006 recording with the Frankfurt Radio Symphony

== Career ==
From 1994 to 1997, Järvi was principal conductor of the Malmö Symphony Orchestra. From 1995 to 1998, he shared the title of principal guest conductor of the Royal Stockholm Philharmonic Orchestra with Andrew Davis. From 2001 to 2011 he was music director of the Cincinnati Symphony Orchestra and subsequently named music director laureate.

Since 2004, Järvi has been the artistic director of the Deutsche Kammerphilharmonie Bremen and an artistic advisor to the Estonian National Symphony Orchestra. In 2006, he became the chief conductor of the Frankfurt Radio Symphony, and served in the post until 2014, following which he was named conductor laureate. In 2010, he became music director of the Orchestre de Paris, concluding his tenure in 2016, the same year in which he was named Artist of the Year by both Gramophone and Diapason magazines.

Järvi is the founder and artistic director of both the Pärnu Music Festival and Estonian Festival Orchestra. Launched in 2011, the festival is recognised as Estonia's leading classical music event, with 10 days of concerts every July on the Baltic coast. In addition to festival performances, Paavo Järvi regularly leads the Estonian Festival Orchestra on tour in Europe and Asia. In 2025, the orchestra made its New York debut, headlining Carnegie Hall's 90th birthday tribute to Arvo Pärt.

In June 2012, the NHK Symphony Orchestra appointed Järvi its chief conductor from the 2015–2016 season. Järvi held the post through August 2022, after which he was named honorary conductor.

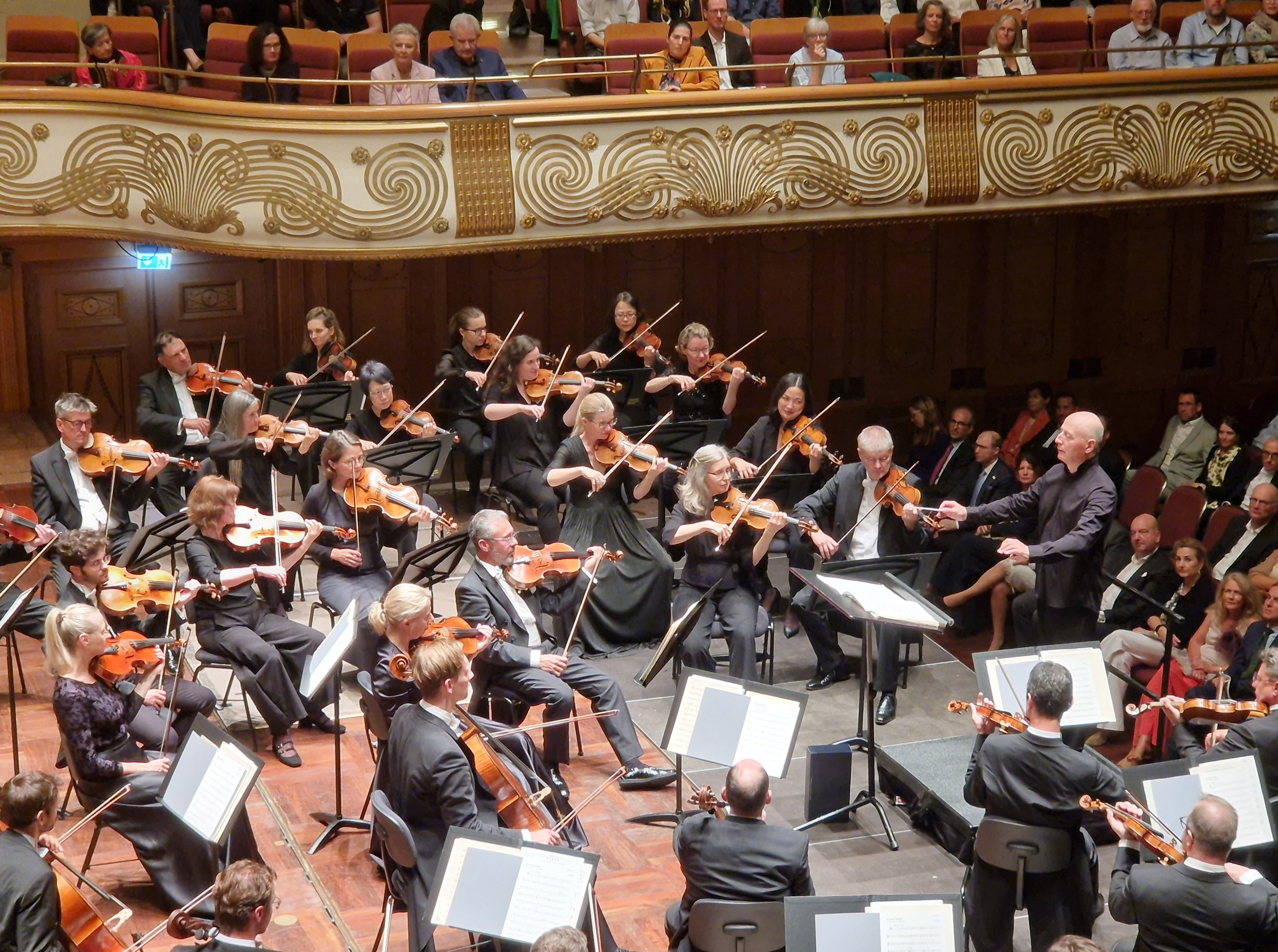
Järvi conducting the Tonhalle-Orchester Zürich at the Kurhaus, Wiesbaden, 2026

Järvi first guest-conducted the Tonhalle-Orchester Zürich in 2009, and returned in December 2016. He commenced his tenure as the orchestra's chief conductor and music director in September 2019. In 2022, the Tonhalle-Orchester Zürich extended his contract through the 2028–2029 season.

In March 2026, the London Philharmonic Orchestra announced the appointment of Järvi as its next chief conductor and artistic advisor, effective with the 2028–2029 season, with an initial contract of five seasons.

Järvi has recorded for such labels as Alpha Classics, RCA, Deutsche Grammophon, PENTATONE, Telarc, ECM, BIS and Virgin Records. His Virgin Classics recording of Sibelius Cantatas with the Estonian National Symphony Orchestra, Estonian National Male Choir and Ellerhein Girls Choir won a Grammy Award for "Best Choral Performance".

== Personal life ==
Järvi has two daughters from his past marriage to the violinist Tatiana Berman. Järvi was featured in the documentary Maestro, directed by David Donnelly. He obtained American citizenship in 1985.

== Discography ==
=== Studio albums ===
Year	Album details
2005	Schumann: Cello Concerto; Bloch: Schelomo; Bruch: Kol Nidrei: Release date: 17 January 2005; Label: Virgin Classics
2007	Tüür: Magma: Release date: 6 August 2007; Label: Virgin Classics
2009	Beethoven: Symphonies Nos. 6 & 2: Release date: 12 October 2009; Label: RCA Red Seal
2015	Rachmaninoff: Symphonie No. 3; Caprice Bohémien; Danses Symphoniques; Le Rocher; Vocalise: Release date: 2 October 2015; Label: Erato Records

== Awards ==
- 2002: Award of the Estonian Cultural Endowment for the Performing Arts (outstanding performances of Estonian music abroad)
- 2004: Grammy Awards
- 2012: Hindemith Prize of the City of Hanau
- 2012: Estonian Radio – Musician of the Year
- 2012: Commandeur de L'Ordre des Arts et des Lettres
- 2012: Award of the Estonian Cultural Endowment for the Performing Arts (for organizing the Järvi Festival and the spectacular introduction of Estonian music on world stages)
- 2013: Order of the White Star, Estonia
- 2015: Sibelius Medal
- 2017: Estonian Music Council Music Award (for keeping Estonian music on the world map as a top conductor)
- 2019: Echo Klassik German major classical music award in the category "Conductor of the Year" for his recording of all of Jean Sibelius' symphonies with l'Orchestre de Paris
- 2024: Postimees Award for Cultural Mover for bringing Estonian music to the world, launching the Estonian Festival Orchestra and making it influential
- 2024: International Classical Music Award (ICMA) for the best symphonic music recording of the year (to Paavo Järvi and the Tonhalle Symphony Orchestra of Zurich for their recording of Anton Bruckner's Symphony No. 8)
- 2026: Order of the Rising Sun, Gold Rays with Neck Ribbon

Cultural offices
Preceded by James DePreist	Principal Conductor, Malmö Symphony Orchestra; 1995–1998	Succeeded by Christoph König
Preceded by Daniel Harding	Artistic Director, Deutsche Kammerphilharmonie, Bremen; 2004–present	Succeeded by incumbent
Preceded by Vladimir Ashkenazy (music director)	Chief Conductor, NHK Symphony Orchestra; 2016–2022	Succeeded by Fabio Luisi
