= David Donnelly =

American filmmaker and writer

- Born: Kentucky, U.S.
- Occupations: Director; writer; producer; artist
- Years active: 2003–present

David Donnelly is an American filmmaker, writer, and artist. He has written, directed, and produced music videos, video installation art, short films, and feature-length documentaries. His work has been featured in Forbes, Playbill, and NPR. He has directed 3 feature-length films and worked on 4 as head producer. He is also the co-founder of CultureNet, an interactive subscription service.

== Early career ==
Donnelly graduated from the International Baccalaureate program and continued his education at Washington University in St. Louis.

In his mid-twenties, Donnelly began directing commercials and educational films, selling his first short film series, Think About It, in 2008. In 2010, the Miami-based Consequences Foundation commissioned Donnelly to write and direct a short film about South Florida's juvenile crime epidemic. The film, which features a message from the rapper Ludacris and convicted felons, was screened to Miami area juveniles after their arrest, in hopes of inspiring them to stay out of jail.

== Music and art-related works ==
In late 2015, Donnelly released his first feature-length documentary: Maestro. The crew followed several Grammy award-winning musicians across the globe. Maestro has been translated into ten languages and aired on international networks. It is utilized as a resource for music educators. Donnelly is also the author of a Huffington Post essay "Why Failing Orchestras are the Problem of Every American".

Donnelly directed the first music video "High Done No Why To" for ensemble Roomful of Teeth. His music video "Vitali Variations", featuring violinist Tatiana Berman, was aired in twenty-six countries. Donnelly is the creator of the concert series Not So Classical, which is a hybrid film/concert experience and has starred saxophonist Amy Dickson and The Masked Singer judge Ken Jeong.

Donnelly's conceptual art has been featured at the Constella Festival of Music and Fine Art and has been acquired by collectors. Donnelly has been a guest speaker at the Curtis Institute of Music and Cincinnati College Conservatory of Music. He is also a visual artist.

Donnelly is also a co-founder of CultureNet, an interactive subscription service for music-lovers and educators. CultureNet has been featured on CBS News, Thrive Global, Billboard, Digital Trends, and the Penn Law Journal.

== Film projects ==
Donnelly is the executive producer of the documentary Gabe (2017). Gabe tells the story of a young man battling muscular dystrophy which premiered at the Whitney Museum in 2016. He is the director of Forte and Nordic Pulse starring Kristjan Järvi & Paavo Järvi, feature-length documentaries focusing on classical music and scheduled for international release throughout 2020.
