= Ephippus of Athens =

Ancient Greek comic poet

Ephippus of Athens (Ancient Greek: Ἔφιππος ὁ Ἀθηναῖος) was an Ancient Greek comic poet of the middle comedy.

He is known from the testimonies of Suidas and Antiochus of Alexandria, and from the allusions in his fragments to Plato, and the Academic philosophers, and to Alexander of Pherae and his contemporaries, Dionysius the Elder, Cotys, Theodorus, and others.

The following twelve titles of his plays are the known to us: Artemis, Bousiris, Gêruonês ("The Geryons"), Empolê ("Merchandise"), Ephêboi ("Adolescents"), Kirkê ("Circe"), Kudôn, Nauagos ("Shipwrecked"), Obeliaphoroi ê Homoioi, Peltastês, Sapphô, and Philura. An epigram which Eustathius ascribes to Ephippus is not his, but the production of some unknown author. There are some fragments also extant from the unknown plays of Ephippus.
