= Hindemith Prize of the City of Hanau =

German music award

- Awarded for: "outstanding musical achievement"
- Sponsored by: City of Hanau, Hindemith Foundation in Blonay (Switzerland)
- Location: Hanau
- Country: Germany
- Presented by: Lord mayor of Hanau
- Rewards: €10,000, Certificate, Medal of honor in silver
- First award: 2000
- Website: www.hanau.de/aktuelles/preise-und-ehrungen/paul-hindemith-preis/index.html

The Hindemith Prize of the City of Hanau is a music prize given by Hanau, Hesse, Germany and the Hindemith Foundation in Blonay (Switzerland), since 2000. Until 2004 the prize was called Paul Hindemith Prize for Art and Humanity of the City of Hanau in honour and remembrance of the composer Paul Hindemith. The prize consists of a certificate, a medal of honor in silver and €10,000. It is awarded biennially in recognition of outstanding musical achievement.

== Recipients ==
- 2000: Albert Mangelsdorff
- 2002: Rolf Riehm
- 2004: Daniel Barenboim
- 2006: Tabea Zimmermann
- 2008: Gerd Albrecht
- 2010: Frank Peter Zimmermann
- 2012: Paavo Järvi
- 2014: Zehetmair Quartet
- 2016: Christoph Eschenbach
- 2019: Olli Mustonen
- 2022: Antoine Tamestit
- 2025: Juliane Banse
