= Circe =

Enchantress-goddess in Greek mythology

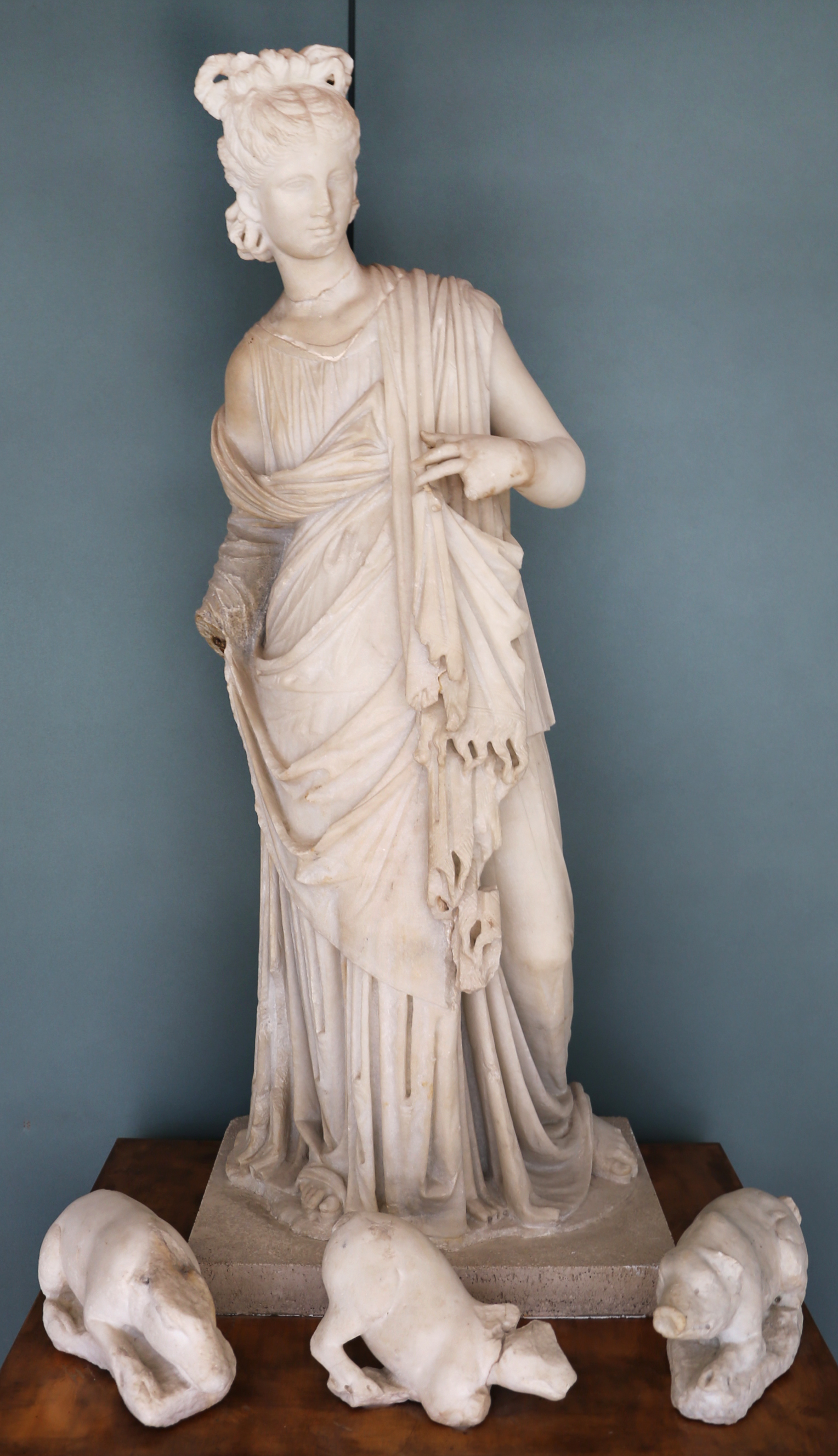
- Statuette of Circe and pigs from the Sperlonga sculptures, 2nd–3rd century CE
- Abode: Aeaea

Genealogy
- Parents: Helios and Perse
- Siblings: Aeëtes, Pasiphaë, Aloeus, Perses, Phaethon, the Heliades, the Heliadae and others
- Consort: Odysseus, Telemachus
- Children: Latinus, Telegonus, Cassiphone, Rhomos, Ardeas, Anteias

In Greek mythology, Circe (Ancient Greek pronunciation: [kírkɛː], Greek pronunciation: [ˈcir.ci] pronounced /ˈsɜːr.siː/; Ancient Greek: Κίρκη, romanized: Kírkē) is a witch and goddess. In most accounts, Circe is described as a daughter of the sun god Helios and the Oceanid Perse. Circe was renowned for her vast knowledge of potions and herbs. Through the use of these and a magic wand or staff, she transformed her enemies, or those who offended her, into animals. Some sources call her a nymph.

The best known of her legends is told in Homer's Odyssey when Odysseus visits her island of Aeaea on the way back from the Trojan War and she changes most of his crew into swine. He manages to persuade her to return them to human shape, lives with her for a year and has sons by her, including Latinus and Telegonus. Her ability to change others into animals is further highlighted by the story of Picus, an Italian king whom she turns into a woodpecker for resisting her advances. Another story tells of her falling in love with the sea-god Glaucus, who prefers the nymph Scylla to her. In revenge, Circe poisoned the water where her rival bathed and turned her into a dreadful monster.

Depictions, even in Classical times, diverged from the detail in Homer's narrative, which was later to be reinterpreted morally as a cautionary story against drunkenness. Early philosophical questions were also raised about whether the change from being a human endowed with reason to being an unreasoning beast might not be preferable after all, and the resulting debate was to have a powerful impact during the Renaissance. Circe was also taken as the archetype of the predatory female. In the eyes of those from a later age, this behaviour made her notorious both as a magician and as a type of sexually free woman. She has been frequently depicted as such in all the arts from the Renaissance down to modern times.

Western paintings established a visual iconography for the figure, but also went for inspiration to other stories concerning Circe that appear in Ovid's Metamorphoses. The episodes of Scylla and Picus added the vice of violent jealousy to her bad qualities and made her a figure of fear as well as of desire.

== Classical literature ==
=== Family and attributes ===
By most accounts, she was the daughter of the sun god Helios and Perse, one of the three thousand Oceanid nymphs. In Orphic Argonautica, her mother is called Asterope instead. Her brother was Aeëtes, keeper of the Golden Fleece and father of Medea, and some late sources add also Perses, who is sometimes only her brother on her mother's side. Pasiphaë, the wife of King Minos and mother of the Minotaur, is sometimes listed as her half or full sister. Other accounts by Dionysius Scytobrachion and Diodorus Siculus make her and Medea the daughters of Hecate, by Aeëtes. However, both authors were attempting to rationalise Greek myth by removing supernatural elements and attributing them to mere misunderstandings; thus although they have Hecate as Circe's mother, both characterise Hecate as a mortal woman who discovered drugs and their properties with no relation to actual magic, instead of an immortal goddess. Circe was often confused with Calypso, due to her shifts in behavior and personality, and the association that both of them had with Odysseus.

According to Greek legend, Circe lived on the island of Aeaea. Although Homer is vague when it comes to the island's whereabouts, the early 3rd BC author Apollonius of Rhodes's epic poem Argonautica locates Aeaea somewhere south of Aethalia (Elba), within view of the Tyrrhenian shore (that is, the western coast of Italy). In the same poem, Circe's brother Aeëtes describes how Circe was transferred to Aeaea: "I noted it once after taking a ride in my father Helios' chariot, when he was taking my sister Circe to the western land and we came to the coast of the Tyrrhenian mainland, where she dwells to this day, very far from the Colchian land." A scholiast on Apollonius Rhodius claims that Apollonius is following Hesiod's tradition in making Circe arrive in Aeaea on Helios' chariot, while Valerius Flaccus writes that Circe was borne away by winged dragons. Roman poets associated her with the most ancient traditions of Latium, and made her home to be on the promontory of Circeo.

Homer describes Circe as "a dreadful goddess with lovely hair and human speech". Apollonius writes that she (just like every other descendant of Helios) had flashing golden eyes that shot out rays of light, with the author of Argonautica Orphica noting that she had hair like fiery rays. Ovid's The Cure for Love implies that Circe might have been taught the knowledge of herbs and potions from her mother Perse, who seems to have had similar skills.

Circe's family tree

Gaia
Uranus
Hyperion	Theia	Oceanus	Tethys
Helios	Perse
Circe	Aeëtes	Pasiphaë	Perses	Aloeus

=== Pre-Odyssey ===
In the Argonautica, Apollonius relates that Circe purified the Argonauts for the murder of Medea's brother Absyrtus, possibly reflecting an early tradition. In this poem, the Argonauts find Circe bathing in salt water; the animals that surround her are not former lovers transformed but primeval "beasts, not resembling the beasts of the wild, nor yet like men in body, but with a medley of limbs." Circe invites Jason, Medea and their crew into her mansion; uttering no words, they show her the still bloody sword they used to cut Absyrtus down, and Circe immediately realizes they have visited her to be purified of murder. She purifies them by slitting the throat of a suckling pig and letting the blood drip on them. Afterwards, Medea tells Circe their tale in great detail, albeit omitting the part of Absyrtus' murder; nevertheless, Circe is not fooled, and greatly disapproves of their actions. However, out of pity for the girl, and on account of their kinship, she promises not to be an obstacle on their way, and orders Jason and Medea to leave her island immediately.

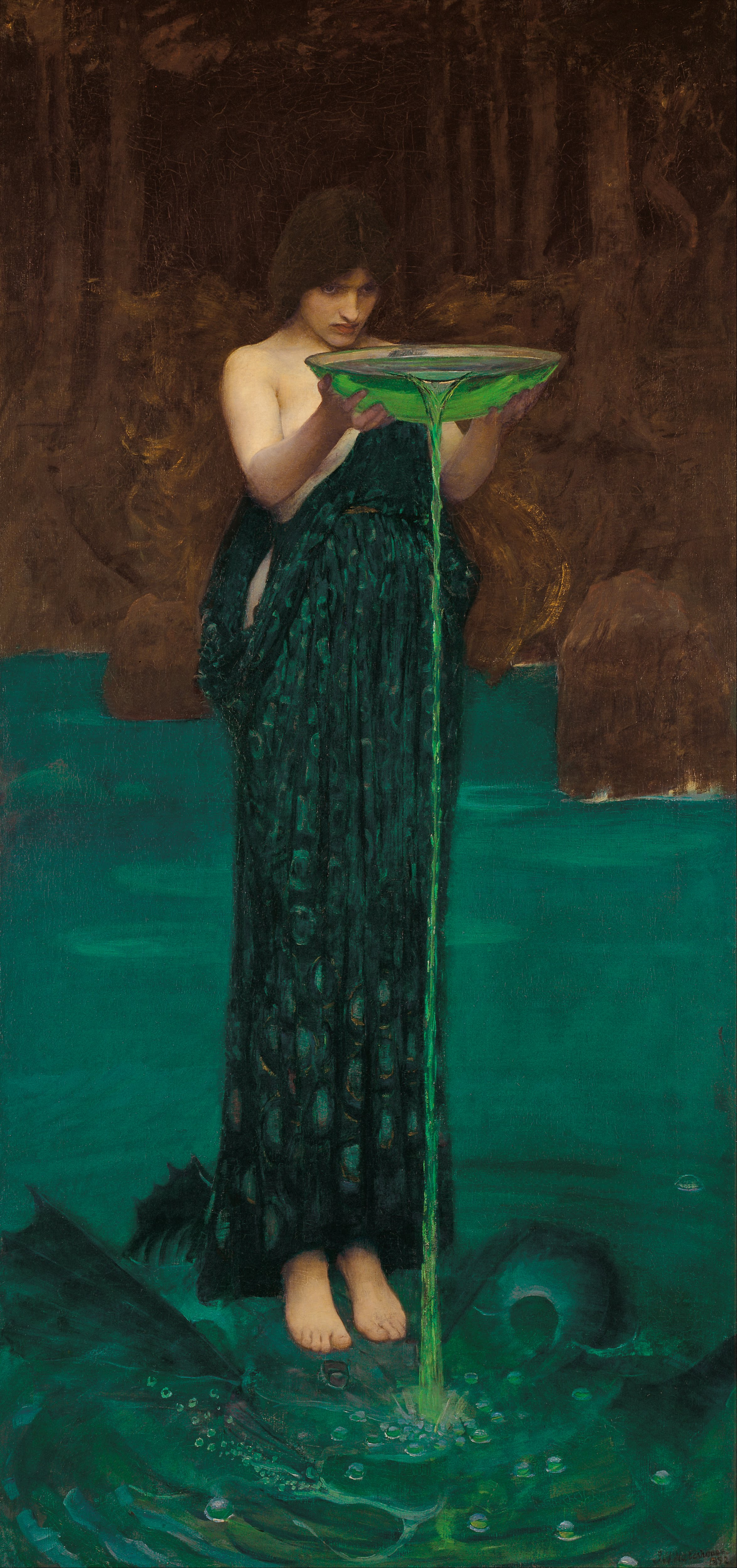
Circe and Scylla in John William Waterhouse's Circe Invidiosa (1892)

The sea-god Glaucus was in love with a beautiful maiden, Scylla, but she spurned his affections no matter how he tried to win her heart. Glaucus went to Circe, and asked her for a magic potion to make Scylla fall in love with him too. But Circe was smitten by Glaucus herself, and fell in love with him. Glaucus did not love her back, and turned down her offer of marriage. Enraged, Circe used her knowledge of herbs and plants to take her revenge; she found the spot where Scylla usually took her bath, and poisoned the water. When Scylla went down to it to bathe, dogs sprang from her thighs and she was transformed into the familiar monster from the Odyssey. In another, similar story, Picus was a Latian king whom Circe turned into a woodpecker. He was the son of Saturn, and a king of Latium. He fell in love and married a nymph, Canens, to whom he was utterly devoted. One day as he was hunting boars, he came upon Circe, who was gathering herbs in the woods. Circe fell immediately in love with him; but Picus, just like Glaucus before him, spurned her and declared that he would remain forever faithful to Canens. Circe, furious, turned Picus into a woodpecker. His wife Canens eventually wasted away in her mourning.

During the war between the gods and the giants, one of the giants, Picolous, fled the battle against the gods and came to Aeaea, Circe's island. He attempted to chase Circe away, only to be killed by Helios, Circe's ally and father. From the blood of the slain giant, a herb came into existence; moly, named thus from the battle (malos) and with a white-coloured flower, either for the white Sun who had killed Picolous or the terrified Circe who turned white; the very plant, which mortals are unable to pluck from the ground, that Hermes would later give to Odysseus in order to defeat Circe.

=== Homer's Odyssey ===
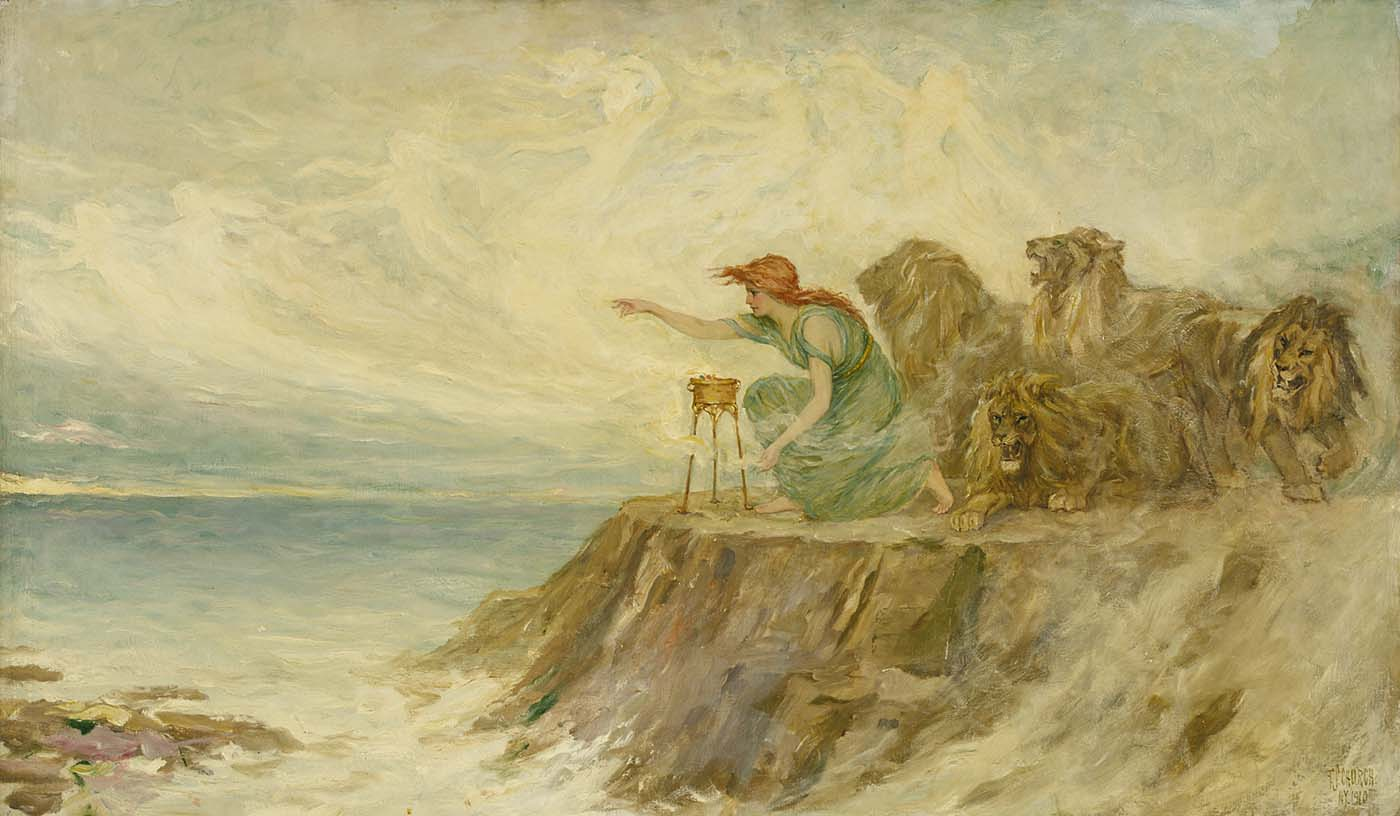
Frederick S. Church's Circe (1910)

In Homer's Odyssey, an 8th-century BC sequel to his Trojan War epic Iliad, Circe is initially described as a beautiful goddess living in a palace isolated in the midst of a dense wood on her island of Aeaea. Around her home prowl strangely docile lions and wolves. She lures any who land on the island to her home with her lovely singing while weaving on an enormous loom, but later drugs them so that they change shape. One of her Homeric epithets is polypharmakos, "knowing many drugs or charms".

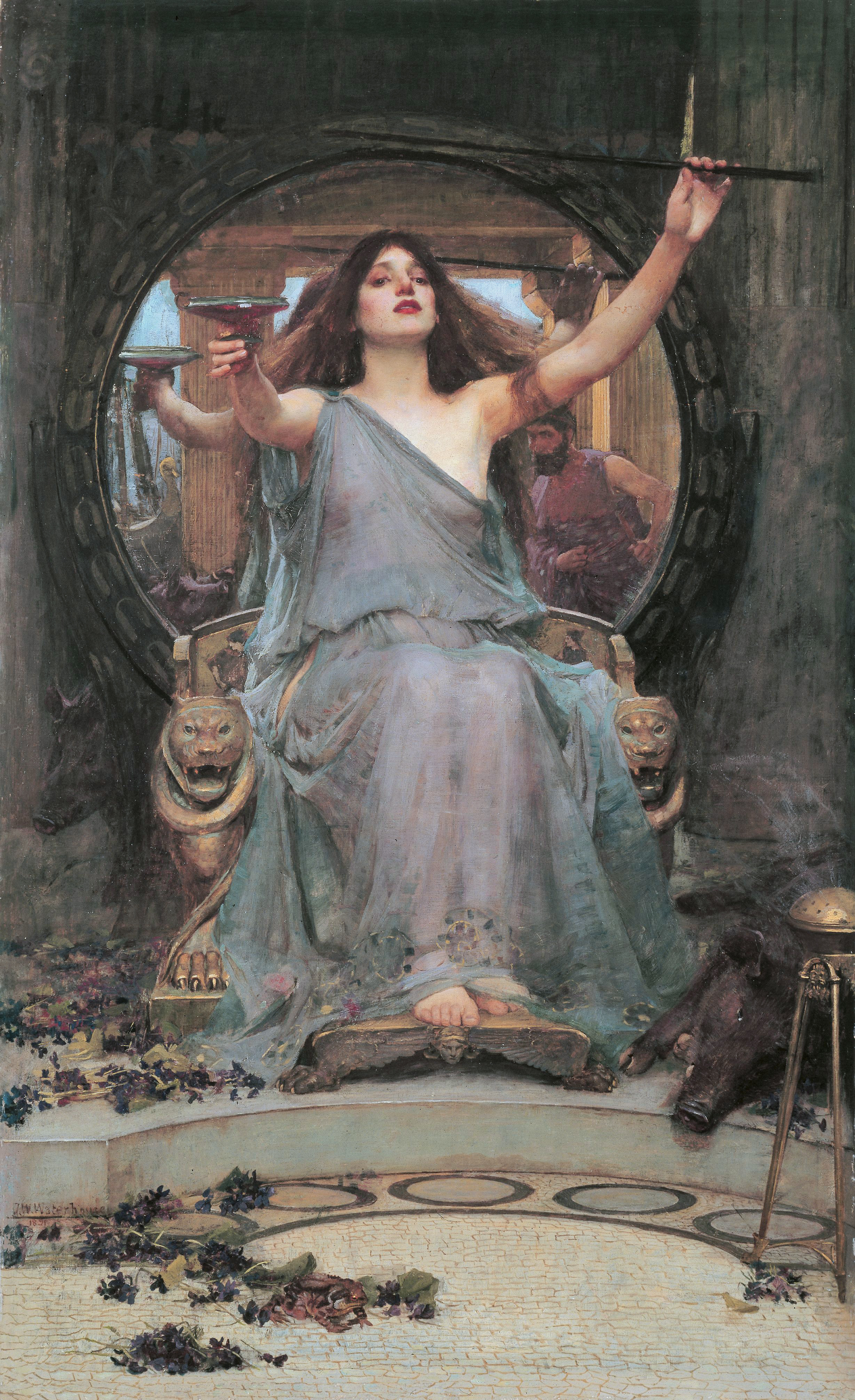
Circe Offering the Cup to Ulysses by John William Waterhouse, 1891

Circe invites the hero Odysseus's crew to a feast of familiar food, a pottage of cheese and meal, sweetened with honey and laced with wine, but also mixed with one of her magical potions that turns them into swine. Only Eurylochus, who suspects treachery, does not go in. He escapes to warn Odysseus and the others who have remained with the ship. Before Odysseus reaches Circe's palace, Hermes, the messenger god sent by the goddess of wisdom Athena, intercepts him and reveals how he might defeat Circe in order to free his crew from their enchantment. Hermes provides Odysseus with moly to protect him from Circe's magic. He also tells Odysseus that he must then draw his sword and act as if he were going to attack her. From there, as Hermes foretold, Circe would ask Odysseus to bed, but Hermes advises caution, for the treacherous goddess could still "unman" him unless he has her swear by the names of the gods that she will not take any further action against him. Following this advice, Odysseus is able to free his men.

After they have all remained on the island for a year, Circe advises Odysseus that he must first visit the Underworld, something a mortal has never yet done, in order to gain knowledge about how to appease the gods, return home safely and recover his kingdom. Circe also advises him on how this might be achieved and furnishes him with the protections he will need and the means to communicate with the dead. On his return, she further advises him about two possible routes home, warning him, however, that both carry great danger.

=== Post-Odyssey ===
Towards the end of Hesiod's Theogony (c. 700 BC), it is stated that Circe bore Odysseus three sons: Agrius (otherwise unknown); Latinus; and Telegonus, who ruled over the Tyrsenoi, that is the Etruscans. The Telegony, an epic now lost, relates the later history of the last of these. Circe eventually informed her son who his absent father was and, when he set out to find Odysseus, gave him a poisoned spear. When Telegonus arrived in Ithaca, Odysseus was away in Thesprotia, fighting the Brygi. Telegonus began to ravage the island; Odysseus came to defend his land. With the weapon Circe gave him, Telegonus killed his father unknowingly. Telegonus then brought back his father's corpse to Aeaea, together with Penelope and Odysseus' son by her, Telemachus. After burying Odysseus, Circe made the other three immortal.

Circe married Telemachus, and Telegonus married Penelope by the advice of Athena. According to an alternative version depicted in Lycophron's 3rd-century BC poem Alexandra (and John Tzetzes' scholia on it), Circe used magical herbs to bring Odysseus back to life after he had been killed by Telegonus. Odysseus then gave Telemachus to Circe's daughter Cassiphone in marriage. Sometime later, Telemachus had a quarrel with his mother-in-law and killed her; Cassiphone then killed Telemachus to avenge her mother's death. On hearing of this, Odysseus died of grief.

Dionysius of Halicarnassus (1.72.5) cites Xenagoras, the 2nd-century BC historian, as saying that Odysseus and Circe had three different sons: Rhomos, Anteias, and Ardeias, who respectively founded three cities called by their names: Rome, Antium, and Ardea. In the later 5th-century CE epic Dionysiaca, its author Nonnus mentions Phaunus, Circe's son by the sea god Poseidon.

=== Other works ===
Three ancient plays about Circe have been lost: the work of the tragedian Aeschylus and of the 4th-century BC comic dramatists Ephippus of Athens and Anaxilas. The first told the story of Odysseus' encounter with Circe. Vase paintings from the period suggest that Odysseus' half-transformed animal-men formed the chorus in place of the usual Satyrs. Fragments of Anaxilas also mention the transformation and one of the characters complains of the impossibility of scratching his face now that he is a pig.

The theme of Circe turning men into a variety of animals was elaborated by later writers. In his episodic work The Sorrows of Love (first century BC), Parthenius of Nicaea interpolated another episode into the time that Odysseus was staying with Circe. Pestered by the amorous attentions of King Calchus the Daunian, the sorceress invited him to a drugged dinner that turned him into a pig and then shut him up in her sties. He was only released when his army came searching for him on the condition that he would never set foot on her island again.

Among Latin treatments, Virgil's Aeneid relates how Aeneas skirts the Italian island where Circe dwells and hears the cries of her many male victims, who now number more than the pigs of earlier accounts: "The roars of lions that refuse the chain, / The grunts of bristled boars, and groans of bears, / And herds of howling wolves that stun the sailors' ears". In Ovid's 1st-century poem Metamorphoses, the fourth episode covers Circe's encounter with Ulysses (the Roman name of Odysseus), whereas book 14 covers the stories of Picus and Glaucus.

Plutarch took up the theme in a lively dialogue that was later to have several imitators. Contained in his 1st-century Moralia is the Gryllus episode in which Circe allows Odysseus to interview a fellow Greek turned into a pig. After his interlocutor informs Odysseus that his present existence is preferable to the human, they engage in a philosophical dialogue in which every human value is questioned and beasts are proved to be of superior wisdom and virtue.

== Ancient cult ==
Strabo writes that a tomb-shrine of Circe was attended in one of the Pharmacussae islands, off the coast of Attica, typical for hero-worship. Circe was also venerated in Mount Circeo, in the Italian peninsula, which took its name after her according to ancient legend. Strabo says that Circe had a shrine in the small town, and that the people there kept a bowl they claimed belonged to Odysseus. The promontory is occupied by ruins of a platform attributed with great probability to a temple of Venus or Circe.

== Later literature ==
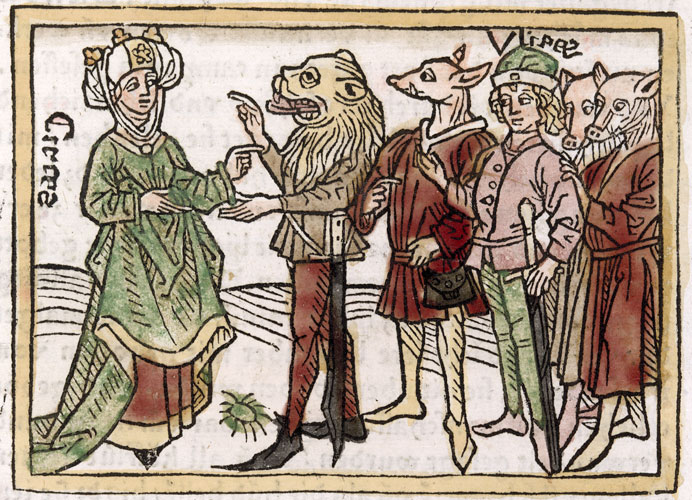
"Circea" in Boccaccio's c. 1365 De Claris Mulieribus, a catalogue of famous women, from a 1474 edition

Giovanni Boccaccio provided a digest of what was known of Circe during the Middle Ages in his De mulieribus claris (Famous Women, 1361–1362). While following the tradition that she lived in Italy, he comments wryly that there are now many more temptresses like her to lead men astray.

There is a very different interpretation of the encounter with Circe in John Gower's long didactic poem Confessio Amantis (1380). Ulysses is depicted as deeper in sorcery and readier of tongue than Circe and through this means he leaves her pregnant with Telegonus. Most of the account deals with the son's later quest for and accidental killing of his father, drawing the moral that only evil can come of the use of sorcery.

The story of Ulysses and Circe was retold as an episode in Georg Rollenhagen's German verse epic, Froschmeuseler (The Frogs and Mice, Magdeburg, 1595). In this 600-page expansion of the pseudo-Homeric Batrachomyomachia, it is related at the court of the mice and takes up sections 5–8 of the first part.

In Lope de Vega's miscellany La Circe – con otras rimas y prosas (1624), the story of her encounter with Ulysses appears as a verse epic in three cantos. This takes its beginning from Homer's account, but it is then embroidered; in particular, Circe's love for Ulysses remains unrequited.

As "Circe's Palace", Nathaniel Hawthorne retold the Homeric account as the third section in his collection of stories from Greek mythology, Tanglewood Tales (1853). The transformed Picus continually appears in this, trying to warn Ulysses, and then Eurylochus, of the danger to be found in the palace, and is rewarded at the end by being given back his human shape. In most accounts Ulysses only demands this for his own men.

In her survey of the Transformations of Circe, Judith Yarnall comments of this figure, who started out as a comparatively minor goddess of unclear origin, that "What we know for certain – what Western literature attests to – is her remarkable staying power…These different versions of Circe's myth can be seen as mirrors, sometimes clouded and sometimes clear, of the fantasies and assumptions of the cultures that produced them." After appearing as just one of the characters that Odysseus encounters on his wandering, "Circe herself, in the twists and turns of her story through the centuries, has gone through far more metamorphoses than those she inflicted on Odysseus's companions."

=== Reasoning beasts ===
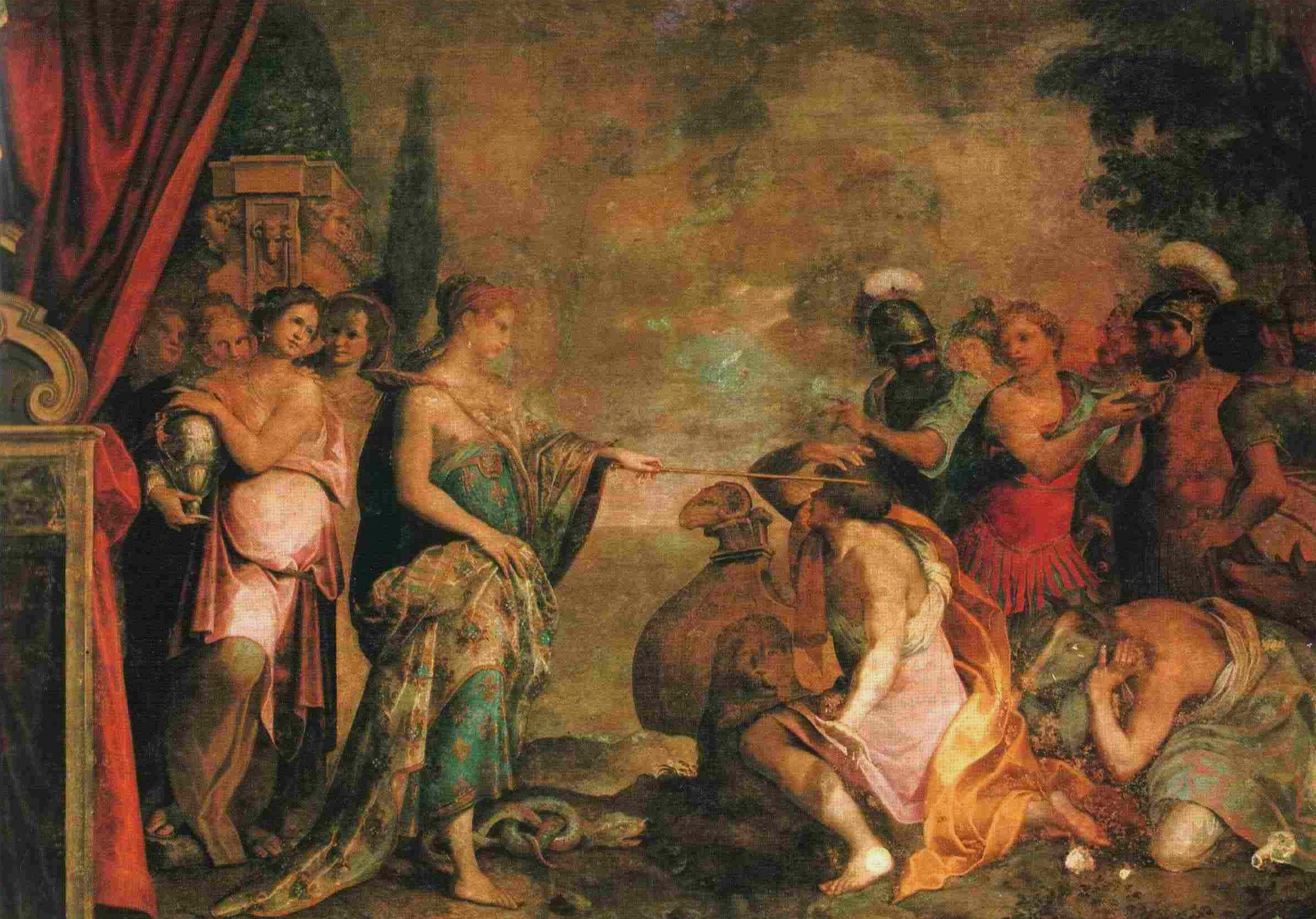
Giovanni Battista Trotti's fresco of Circe returning Ulysses' followers to human form (c. 1610)

One of the most enduring literary themes connected with the figure of Circe was her ability to change men into animals. There was much speculation concerning how this could be, whether the human consciousness changed at the same time, and even whether it was a change for the better. The Gryllus dialogue was taken up by another Italian writer, Giovan Battista Gelli, in his La Circe (1549). This is a series of ten philosophical and moral dialogues between Ulysses and the humans transformed into various animals, ranging from an oyster to an elephant, in which Circe sometimes joins. Most argue against changing back; only the last animal, a philosopher in its former existence, wants to. The work was translated into English soon after in 1557 by Henry Iden. Later the English poet Edmund Spenser also made reference to Plutarch's dialogue in the section of his Faerie Queene (1590) based on the Circe episode which appears at the end of Book II. Sir Guyon changes back the victims of Acrasia's erotic frenzy in the Bower of Bliss, most of whom are abashed at their fall from chivalric grace,

"But one above the rest in speciall,
That had an hog beene late, hight Grille by name,
Repined greatly, and did him miscall,
That had from hoggish forme him brought to naturall."

Two other Italians wrote rather different works that centre on the animal within the human. One was Niccolò Machiavelli in his unfinished long poem, L'asino d'oro (The Golden Ass, 1516). The author meets a beautiful herdswoman surrounded by Circe's herd of beasts. After spending a night of love with him, she explains the characteristics of the animals in her charge: the lions are the brave, the bears are the violent, the wolves are those forever dissatisfied, and so on (Canto 6). In Canto 7 he is introduced to those who experience frustration: a cat that has allowed its prey to escape; an agitated dragon; a fox constantly on the look-out for traps; a dog that bays the moon; Aesop's lion in love that allowed himself to be deprived of his teeth and claws. There are also emblematic satirical portraits of various Florentine personalities. In the eighth and last canto he has a conversation with a pig that, like the Gryllus of Plutarch, does not want to be changed back and condemns human greed, cruelty and conceit.

The other Italian author was the esoteric philosopher Giordano Bruno, who wrote in Latin. His Cantus Circaeus (The Incantation of Circe) was the fourth work on memory and the association of ideas by him to be published in 1582. It contains a series of poetic dialogues, in the first of which, after a long series of incantations to the seven planets of the Hermetic tradition, most humans appear changed into different creatures in the scrying bowl. The sorceress Circe is then asked by her handmaiden Moeris about the type of behaviour with which each is associated. According to Circe, for instance, "fireflies are the learned, wise, and illustrious amidst idiots, asses, and obscure men" (Question 32). In later sections different characters discuss the use of images in the imagination in order to facilitate use of the art of memory, which is the real aim of the work.

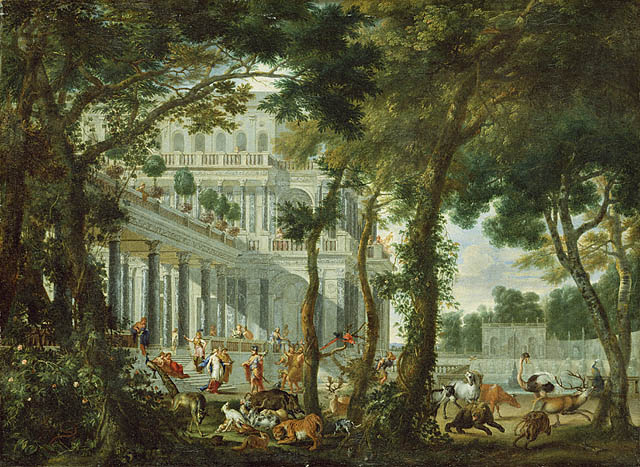
Wilhelm Schubert van Ehrenberg's Ulysses at the Palace of Circe (1667)

French writers were to take their lead from Gelli in the following century. Antoine Jacob wrote a one-act social comedy in rhyme, Les Bestes raisonnables (The Reasoning Beasts, 1661) which allowed him to satirise contemporary manners. On the isle of Circe, Ulysses encounters an ass that was once a doctor, a lion that had been a valet, a female doe and a horse, all of whom denounce the decadence of the times. The ass sees human asses everywhere, "Asses in the town square, asses in the suburbs, / Asses in the provinces, asses proud at court, / Asses browsing in the meadows, military asses trooping, / Asses tripping it at balls, asses in the theatre stalls." To drive the point home, in the end it is only the horse, formerly a courtesan, who wants to return to her former state.

The same theme occupies La Fontaine's late fable, "The Companions of Ulysses" (XII.1, 1690), which also echoes Plutarch and Gelli. Once transformed, every animal (which includes a lion, a bear, a wolf and a mole) protests that their lot is better and refuses to be restored to human shape. Charles Dennis shifted this fable to stand at the head of his translation of La Fontaine, Select Fables (1754), but provides his own conclusion that "When Mortals from the path of Honour stray, / And the strong passions over reason sway, / What are they then but Brutes? / 'Tis vice alone that constitutes / Th'enchanting wand and magic bowl, The exterior form of Man they wear, / But are in fact both Wolf and Bear, / The transformation's in the Soul."

Louis Fuzelier and Marc-Antoine Legrand titled their comic opera of 1718 Les animaux raisonnables. It had more or less the same scenario transposed into another medium and set to music by Jacques Aubert. Circe, wishing to be rid of the company of Ulysses, agrees to change back his companions, but only the dolphin is willing. The others, who were formerly a corrupt judge (now a wolf), a financier (a pig), an abused wife (a hen), a deceived husband (a bull) and a flibbertigibbet (a linnet), find their present existence more agreeable.

The Venetian Gasparo Gozzi was another Italian who returned to Gelli for inspiration in the 14 prose Dialoghi dell'isola di Circe (Dialogues from Circe's Island) published as journalistic pieces between 1760 and 1764. In this moral work, the aim of Ulysses in talking to the beasts is to learn more of the human condition. It includes figures from fable (The fox and the crow, XIII) and from myth to illustrate its vision of society at variance. Far from needing the intervention of Circe, the victims find their natural condition as soon as they set foot on the island. The philosopher here is not Gelli's elephant but the bat that retreats from human contact into the darkness, like Bruno's fireflies (VI). The only one who wishes to change in Gozzi's work is the bear, a satirist who had dared to criticize Circe and had been changed as a punishment (IX).

There were two more satirical dramas in later centuries. One modelled on the Gryllus episode in Plutarch occurs as a chapter of Thomas Love Peacock's late novel, Gryll Grange (1861), under the title "Aristophanes in London". Half Greek comedy, half Elizabethan masque, it is acted at the Grange by the novel's characters as a Christmas entertainment. In it Spiritualist mediums raise Circe and Gryllus and try to convince the latter of the superiority of modern times, which he rejects as intellectually and materially regressive. An Italian work drawing on the transformation theme was the comedy by Ettore Romagnoli, La figlia del Sole (The Daughter of the Sun, 1919). Hercules arrives on the island of Circe with his servant Cercopo and has to be rescued by the latter when he too is changed into a pig. But, since the naturally innocent other animals had become corrupted by imitating human vices, the others who had been changed were refused when they begged to be rescued.

Also in England, Austin Dobson engaged more seriously with Homer's account of the transformation of Odysseus' companions when, though "Head, face and members bristle into swine, / Still cursed with sense, their mind remains alone". Dobson's "The Prayer of the Swine to Circe" (1875) depicts the horror of being imprisoned in an animal body in this way with the human consciousness unchanged. There appears to be no relief, for only in the final line is it revealed that Odysseus has arrived to free them. But in Matthew Arnold's dramatic poem "The Strayed Reveller" (1849), in which Circe is one of the characters, the power of her potion is differently interpreted. The inner tendencies unlocked by it are not the choice between animal nature and reason but between two types of impersonality, between divine clarity and the poet's participatory and tragic vision of life. In the poem, Circe discovers a youth laid asleep in the portico of her temple by a draught of her ivy-wreathed bowl. On awaking from possession by the poetic frenzy it has induced, he craves for it to be continued.

=== Sexual politics ===
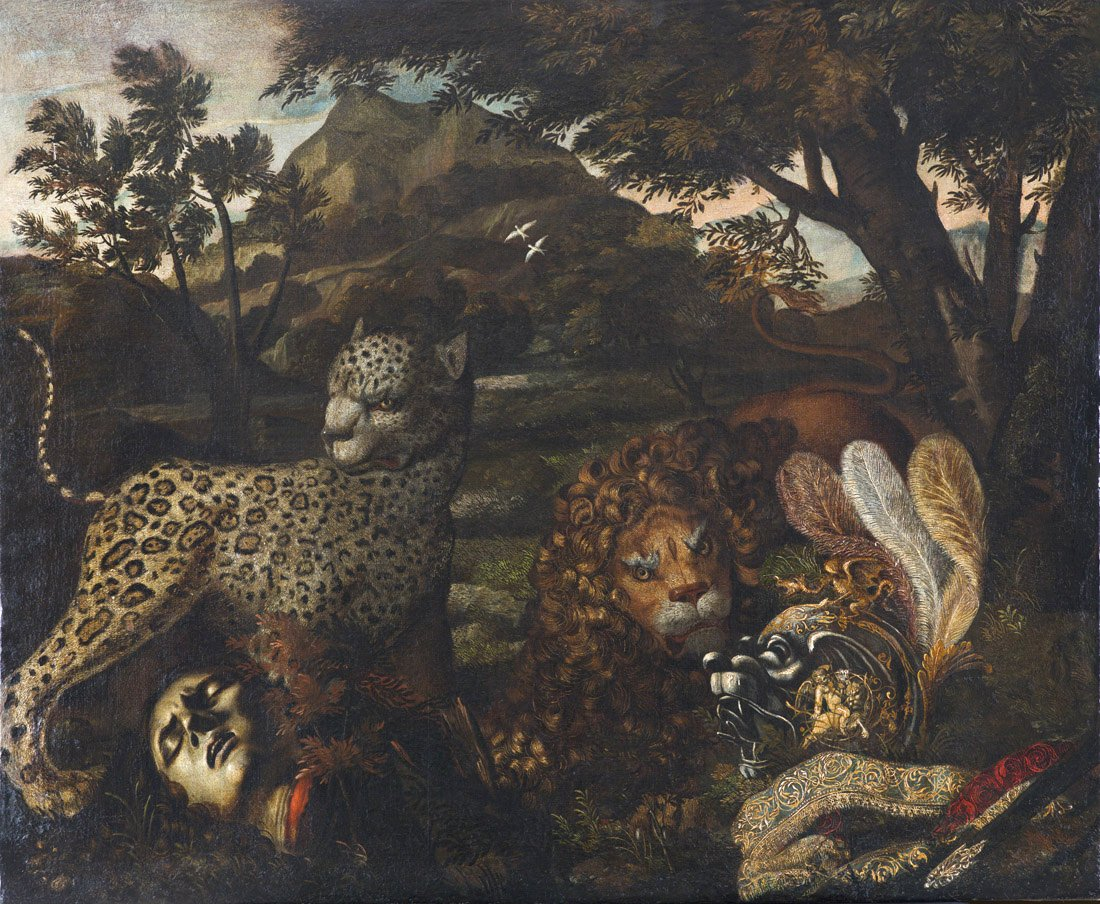
The Kingdom of Sorceress Circe by Angelo Caroselli (c. 1630)

With the Renaissance there began to be a reinterpretation of what it was that changed the men, if it was not simply magic. For Socrates, in Classical times, it had been gluttony overcoming their self-control. But for the influential emblematist Andrea Alciato, it was unchastity. In the second edition of his Emblemata (1546), therefore, Circe became the type of the prostitute. His Emblem 76 is titled Cavendum a meretricibus; its accompanying Latin verses mention Picus, Scylla and the companions of Ulysses, and concludes that "Circe with her famous name indicates a whore and any who loves such a one loses his reason". His English imitator Geoffrey Whitney used a variation of Alciato's illustration in his own Choice of Emblemes (1586) but gave it the new title of Homines voluptatibus transformantur, men are transformed by their passions. This explains her appearance in the Nighttown section named after her in James Joyce's novel Ulysses. Written in the form of a stage script, it makes of Circe the brothel madam, Bella Cohen. Bloom, the book's protagonist, fantasizes that she turns into a cruel man-tamer named Mr Bello who makes him get down on all fours and rides him like a horse.

By the 19th century, Circe was ceasing to be a mythical figure. Poets treated her either as an individual or at least as the type of a certain kind of woman. The French poet Albert Glatigny addresses "Circé" in his Les vignes folles (1857) and makes of her a voluptuous opium dream, the magnet of masochistic fantasies. Louis-Nicolas Ménard's sonnet in Rêveries d'un païen mystique (1876) describes her as enchanting all with her virginal look, but appearance belies the accursed reality. Poets in English were not far behind in this lurid portrayal. Lord de Tabley's "Circe" (1895) is a thing of decadent perversity likened to a tulip, "A flaunting bloom, naked and undivine... / With freckled cheeks and splotch'd side serpentine, / A gipsy among flowers".

That central image is echoed by the blood-striped flower of T. S. Eliot's student poem "Circe's Palace" (1909) in The Harvard Advocate. Circe herself does not appear, her character is suggested by what is in the grounds and the beasts in the forest beyond: panthers, pythons, and peacocks that "look at us with the eyes of men whom we knew long ago". Rather than a temptress, she has become an emasculatory threat.

Several female poets make Circe stand up for herself, using the soliloquy form to voice the woman's position. The 19th-century English poet Augusta Webster, much of whose writing explored the female condition, has a dramatic monologue in blank verse titled "Circe" in her volume Portraits (1870). There the sorceress anticipates her meeting with Ulysses and his men and insists that she does not turn men into pigs—she merely takes away the disguise that makes them seem human. "But any draught, pure water, natural wine, / out of my cup, revealed them to themselves / and to each other. Change? there was no change; / only disguise gone from them unawares". The mythological character of the speaker contributes at a safe remove to the Victorian discourse on women's sexuality by expressing female desire and criticizing the subordinate role given to women in heterosexual politics.

Two American poets also explored feminine psychology in poems ostensibly about the enchantress. Leigh Gordon Giltner's "Circe" was included in her collection The Path of Dreams (1900), the first stanza of which relates the usual story of men turned into swine by her spell. But then a second stanza presents a sensuous portrait of an unnamed woman, very much in the French vein; once more, it concludes, "A Circe's spells transform men into swine". This is no passive victim of male projections but a woman conscious of her sexual power. So too is H.D.'s "Circe", from her collection Hymen (1921). In her soliloquy she reviews the conquests with which she has grown bored, then mourns the one instance when she failed. In not naming Ulysses himself, Doolittle universalises an emotion with which all women might identify. At the end of the century, British poet Carol Ann Duffy wrote a monologue entitled Circe which pictures the goddess addressing an audience of "nereids and nymphs". In this outspoken episode in the war between the sexes, Circe describes the various ways in which all parts of a pig could and should be cooked.

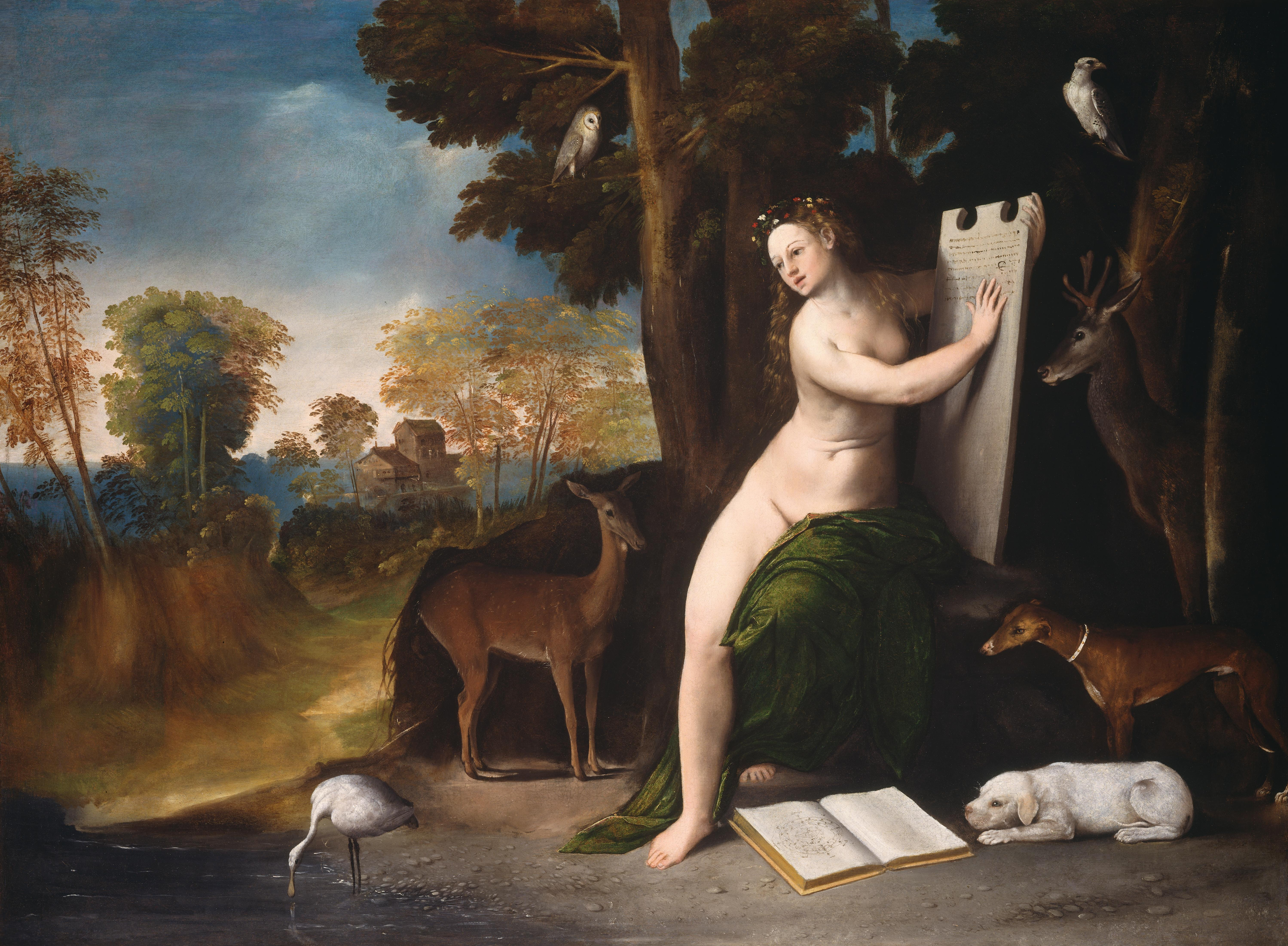
Dosso Dossi's Circe and Her Lovers in a Landscape (c. 1525)

Another indication of the progression in interpreting the Circe figure is given by two poems a century apart, both of which engage with paintings of her. The first is the sonnet that Dante Gabriel Rossetti wrote in response to Edward Burne-Jones' "The Wine of Circe" in his volume Poems (1870). It gives a faithful depiction of the painting's Pre-Raphaelite mannerism but its description of Circe's potion as "distilled of death and shame" also accords with the contemporary (male) identification of Circe with perversity. This is further underlined by his statement (in a letter) that the black panthers there are "images of ruined passion" and by his anticipation at the end of the poem of "passion's tide-strown shore / Where the disheveled seaweed hates the sea". The Australian poet A. D. Hope's "Circe – After the Painting by Dosso Dossi", on the other hand, frankly admits humanity's animal inheritance as natural and something in which even Circe shares. In the poem, he links the fading rationality and speech of her lovers to her own animal cries in the act of love.

There remain some poems that bear her name that have more to do with their writers' private preoccupations than with reinterpreting her myth. The link with it in Margaret Atwood's "Circe/Mud Poems", first published in You Are Happy (1974), is more a matter of allusion and is nowhere overtly stated beyond the title. It is a reflection on contemporary gender politics that scarcely needs the disguises of Augusta Webster's. With two other poems by male writers it is much the same: Louis Macneice's, for example, whose "Circe" appeared in his first volume, Poems (London, 1935); or Robert Lowell's, whose "Ulysses and Circe" appeared in his last, Day by Day (New York, 1977). Both poets have appropriated the myth to make a personal statement about their broken relationships.

=== Parallels and sequels ===
Several Renaissance epics of the 16th century include lascivious sorceresses based on the Circe figure. These generally live in an isolated spot devoted to pleasure, to which lovers are lured and later changed into beasts. They include the following:

- Alcina in the Orlando Furioso (Mad Roland, 1516, 1532) of Ludovico Ariosto, set at the time of Charlemagne. Among its many sub-plots is the episode in which the Saracen champion Ruggiero is taken captive by the sorceress and has to be freed from her magic island.
- The lovers of Filidia in Il Tancredi (1632) by Ascanio Grandi (1567–1647) have been changed into monsters and are liberated by the virtuous Tancred.
- Armida in Torquato Tasso's La Gerusalemme liberata (Jerusalem Delivered, 1566–1575, published 1580) is a Saracen sorceress sent by the infernal senate to sow discord among the Crusaders camped before Jerusalem, where she succeeds in changing a party of them into animals. Planning to assassinate the hero, Rinaldo, she falls in love with him instead and creates an enchanted garden where she holds him a lovesick prisoner who has forgotten his former identity.
- Acrasia in Edmund Spenser's Faerie Queene, mentioned above, is a seductress of knights and holds them enchanted in her Bower of Bliss.

Later scholarship has identified elements from the character of both Circe and especially her fellow enchantress Medea as contributing to the development of the mediaeval legend of Morgan le Fay. In addition, it has been argued that the fairy Titania in William Shakespeare's A Midsummer Night's Dream (1600) is an inversion of Circe. Titania (daughter of the Titans) was a title by which the sorceress was known in Classical times. In this case the tables are turned on the character, who is queen of the fairies. She is made to love an ass after, rather than before, he is transformed into his true animal likeness.

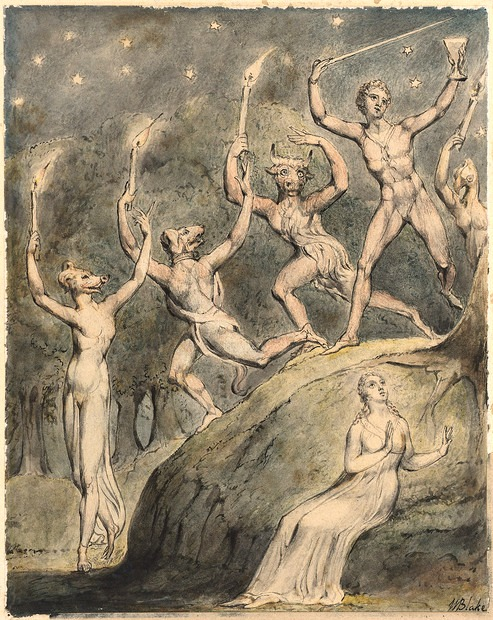
William Blake's 1815 watercolour of Comus and his animal-headed revellers

It has further been suggested that John Milton's Mask Presented at Ludlow Castle (1634) is a sequel to Tempe Restored, a masque in which Circe had figured two years earlier, and that the situation presented there is a reversal of the Greek myth. At the start of the masque, the character Comus is described as the son of Circe by Bacchus, god of wine, and the equal of his mother in enchantment. He too changes travelers into beastly forms that "roll with pleasure in a sensual sty". Having waylaid the heroine and immobilized her on an enchanted chair, he stands over her, wand in hand, and presses on her a magical cup (representing sexual pleasure and intemperance), which she repeatedly refuses, arguing for the virtuousness of temperance and chastity. The picture presented is a mirror image of the Classical story. In place of the witch who easily seduces the men she meets, a male enchanter is resisted by female virtue.

In the 20th century, the Circe episode was to be re-evaluated in two poetic sequels to the Odyssey. In the first of these, Giovanni Pascoli's L'Ultimo Viaggio (The Last Voyage, 1906), the aging hero sets out to rediscover the emotions of his youth by retracing his journey from Troy, only to discover that the island of Eea is deserted. What in his dream of love he had taken for the roaring of lions and Circe's song was now no more than the sound of the sea-wind in autumnal oaks (Cantos 16–17).

This melancholy dispelling of illusion is echoed in The Odyssey: A Modern Sequel (1938) by Nikos Kazantzakis. The fresh voyage in search of new meaning to life recorded there grows out of the hero's initial rejection of his past experiences in the first two sections. The Circe episode is viewed by him as a narrow escape from death of the spirit: With twisted hands and thighs we rolled on burning sands, / a hanging mess of hissing vipers glued in sun!... / Farewell the brilliant voyage, ended! Prow and soul / moored in the muddy port of the contented beast! / O prodigal, much-traveled soul, is this your country? His escape from this mire of sensuality comes one day when the sight of some fishermen, a mother and her baby enjoying the simple comforts of food and drink, recalls him to life, its duties and delights. Where the attempt by Pascoli's hero to recapture the past ended in failure, Kazantzakis' Odysseus, already realising the emptiness of his experiences, journeys into what he hopes will be a fuller future.

== Visual representations ==
=== Ancient art ===
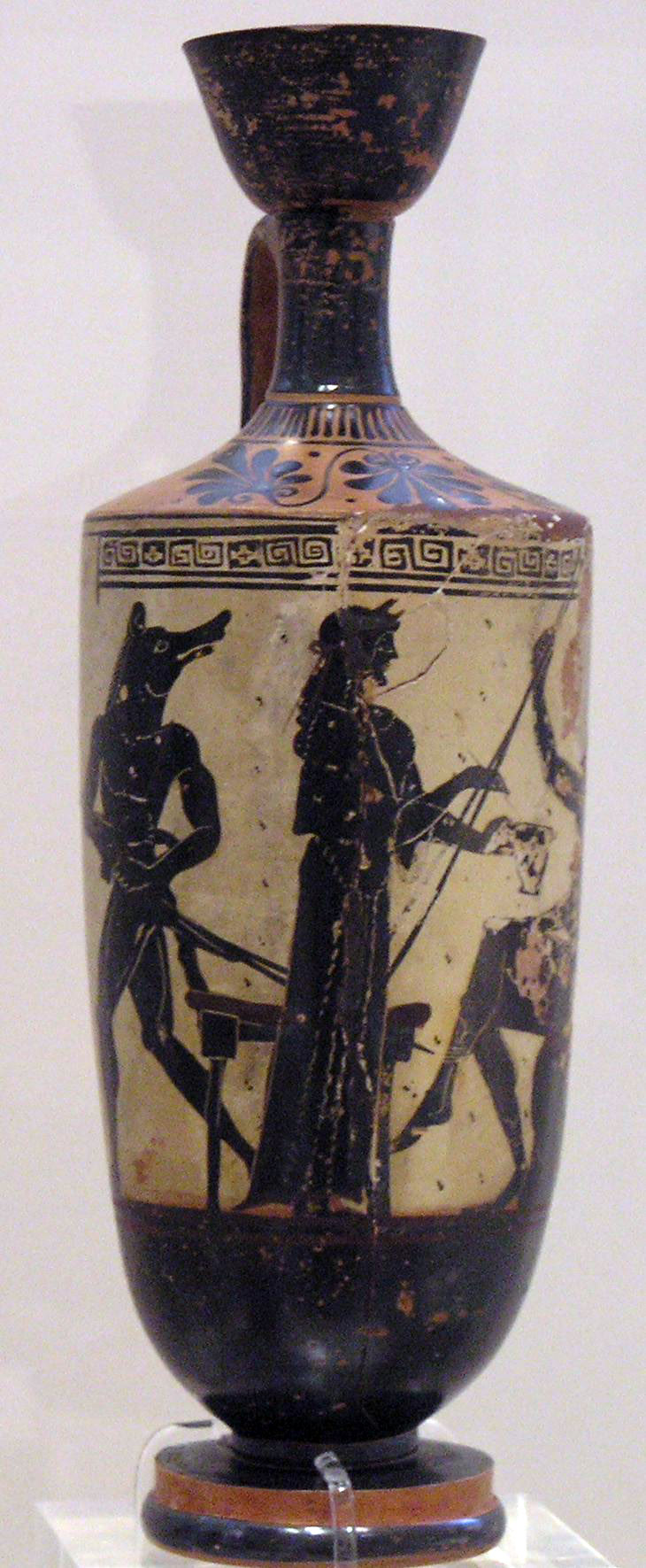
Circe on a 490–480 BC oil jar, Athens-National Archaeological Museum

Scenes from the Odyssey are common on Greek pottery, the Circe episode among them. The two most common representations have Circe surrounded by the transformed sailors and Odysseus threatening the sorceress with his sword. In the case of the former, the animals are not always boars but also include, for instance, the ram, dog and lion on the 6th-century BC Boston kylix. Often the transformation is only partial, involving the head and perhaps a sprouting tail, while the rest of the body is human. In describing an otherwise obscure 5th-century Greek bronze in the Walters Art Museum that takes the form of a man on all fours with the foreparts of a pig, the commentator asks in what other way could an artist depict someone bewitched other than as a man with an animal head. In these scenes Circe is shown almost invariably stirring the potion with her wand, although the incident as described in Homer has her use the wand only to bewitch the sailors after they have refreshed themselves. One exception is the Berlin amphora on which the seated Circe holds the wand towards a half-transformed man.

In the second scene, Odysseus threatens the sorceress with a drawn sword, as Homer describes it. However, he is sometimes depicted carrying spears as well, as in the Athens lekythos, while Homer reports that it was a bow he had slung over his shoulder. In this episode Circe is generally shown in flight, and on the Erlangen lekythos can clearly be seen dropping the bowl and wand behind her. Two curiously primitive wine bowls incorporate the Homeric detail of Circe's handloom, at which the men approaching her palace could hear her singing sweetly as she worked. In the 5th-century skyphos from Boeotia an apparently crippled Odysseus leans on a crutch while a woman with African features holds out a disproportionately large bowl. In the other, a pot-bellied hero brandishes a sword while Circe stirs her potion. Both these may depict the scene as represented in one or other of the comic satyr plays which deal with their encounter. Little remains of these now beyond a few lines by Aeschylus, Ephippus of Athens and Anaxilas. Other vase paintings from the period suggest that Odysseus' half-transformed animal-men formed the chorus in place of the usual satyrs. The reason that it should be a subject of such plays is that wine drinking was often central to their plot. Later writers were to follow Socrates in interpreting the episode as illustrating the dangers of drunkenness.

Other artefacts depicting the story include the chest of Cypselus described in the travelogue by Pausanias. Among its many carvings "there is a grotto and in it a woman sleeping with a man upon a couch. I was of opinion that they were Odysseus and Circe, basing my view upon the number of the handmaidens in front of the grotto and upon what they are doing. For the women are four, and they are engaged on the tasks which Homer mentions in his poetry". The passage in question describes how one of them "threw linen covers over the chairs and spread fine purple fabrics on top. Another drew silver tables up to the chairs, and laid out golden dishes, while a third mixed sweet honeyed wine in a silver bowl, and served it in golden cups. The fourth fetched water and lit a roaring fire beneath a huge cauldron". This suggests a work of considerable detail, while the Etruscan coffin preserved in Orvieto's archaeological museum has only four figures. At the centre Odysseus threatens Circe with drawn sword while an animal headed figure stands on either side, one of them laying his hand familiarly on the hero's shoulder. A bronze mirror relief in the Fitzwilliam Museum is also Etruscan and is inscribed with the names of the characters. There a pig is depicted at Circe's feet, while Odysseus and Elpenor approach her, swords drawn.

=== Portraits in character ===
During the 18th century painters began to portray individual actors in scenes from named plays. There was also a tradition of private performances, with a variety of illustrated works to help with stage properties and costumes. Among these was Thomas Jefferys' A Collection of the Dresses of Different Nations, Antient and Modern (1757–1772) which included a copperplate engraving of a crowned Circe in loose dress, holding a goblet aloft in her right hand and a long wand in her left. Evidence of such performances during the following decades is provided by several portraits in character, of which one of the earliest was the pastel by Daniel Gardner (1750–1805) of "Miss Elliot as Circe". The artist had been a pupil of both George Romney and Joshua Reynolds, who themselves were soon to follow his example. On the 1778 engraving based on Gardner's portrait appear the lines from Milton's Comus: "The daughter of the Sun, whose charmed cup / Whoever tasted, lost his upright shape / And downward fell into a grovelling swine", in compliment to the charm of this marriageable daughter of a country house. As in the Jefferys' plate, she wears a silver coronet over tumbled dark hair, with a wand in the right hand and a goblet in the left. In hindsight the frank eyes that look directly at the viewer and the rosebud mouth are too innocent for the role Miss Elliot is playing.

The subjects of later paintings impersonating Circe have a history of sexual experience behind them, starting with "Mary Spencer in the character of Circe" by William Caddick, which was exhibited at the Royal Academy in 1780. The subject here was the mistress of the painter George Stubbs. A portrait of "Mrs Nesbitt as Circe" by Reynolds followed in 1781. Though this lady's past was ambiguous, she had connections with those in power and was used by the Government as a secret agent. In the painting she is seated sideways, wearing a white, loose-fitting dress, with a wand in her right hand and a gilded goblet near her left. A monkey is crouching above her in the branches of a tree and a panther fraternizes with the kitten on her knee. While the painting undoubtedly alludes to her reputation, it also places itself within the tradition of dressing up in character.

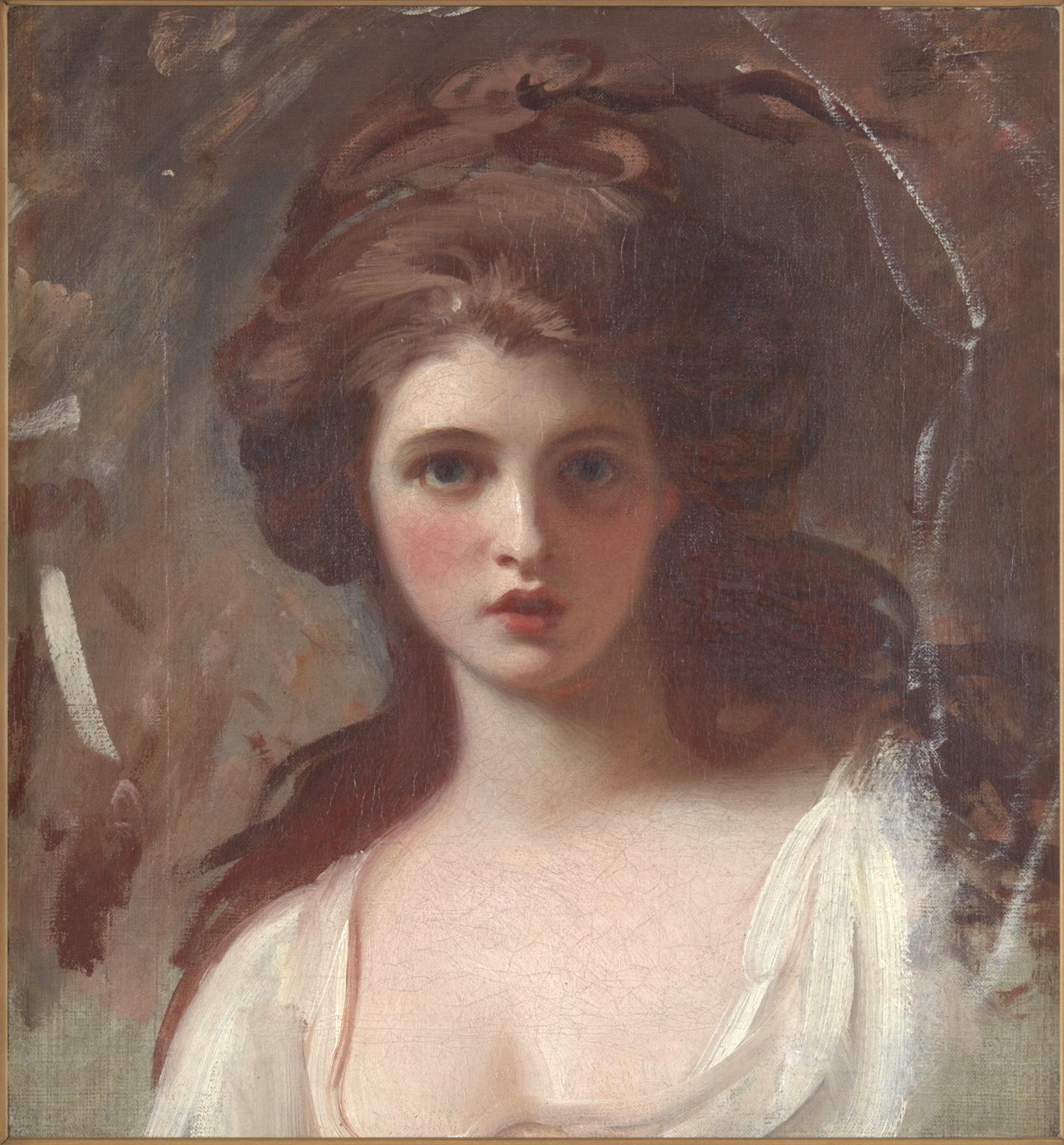
George Romney's c. 1782 portrait of Emma Hamilton as Circe

Soon afterwards, the notorious Emma Hamilton was to raise this to an art form, partly by the aid of George Romney's many paintings of her impersonations. Romney's preliminary study of Emma's head and shoulders, at present in the Tate Gallery, with its piled hair, expressive eyes and mouth, is reminiscent of Samuel Gardener's portrait of Miss Elliot. In the full-length "Lady Hamilton as Circe" at Waddesdon Manor, she is placed in a wooded landscape with wolves snarling to her left, although the tiger originally there has now been painted out. Her left arm is raised to cast a spell while the wand points downward in her right. After Emma moved to Naples and joined Lord Hamilton, she developed what she called her "Attitudes" into a more public entertainment. Specially designed, loose-fitting tunics were paired with large shawls or veils as she posed in such a way as to evoke figures from Classical mythology. These developed from mere poses, with the audience guessing the names of the classical characters and scenes that she portrayed, into small, wordless charades.

The tradition of dressing up in character continued into the following centuries. One of the photographic series by Julia Margaret Cameron, a pupil of the painter George Frederic Watts, was of mythical characters, for whom she used the children of friends and servants as models. Young Kate Keown sat for the head of "Circe" in about 1865 and is pictured wearing a grape and vineleaf headdress to suggest the character's use of wine to bring a change in personality. The society portrait photographer Yevonde Middleton, also known as Madame Yevonde, was to use a 1935 aristocratic charity ball as the foundation for her own series of mythological portraits in colour. Its participants were invited to her studio afterwards to pose in their costumes. There Baroness Dacre is pictured as Circe with a leafy headdress about golden ringlets and clasping a large Baroque porcelain goblet.

A decade earlier, the illustrator Charles Edmund Brock extended into the 20th century what is almost a pastiche of the 18th-century conversation piece in his "Circe and the Sirens" (1925). In this the Honourable Edith Chaplin (1878–1959), Marchioness of Londonderry, and her three youngest daughters are pictured in a garden setting grouped about a large pet goat. Three women painters also produced portraits using the convention of the sitter in character. The earliest was Beatrice Offor (1864–1920), whose sitter's part in her 1911 painting of Circe is suggested by the vine-leaf crown in her long dark hair, the snake-twined goblet she carries and the snake bracelet on her left arm. Mary Cecil Allen was of Australian origin but was living in the United States at the time "Miss Audrey Stevenson as Circe" was painted (1930). Though only a head and shoulders sketch, its colouring and execution suggest the sitter's lively personality. Rosemary Valodon (born 1947), from the same country, painted a series of Australian personalities in her goddess series. "Margarita Georgiadis as Circe" (1991) is a triptych, the central panel of which portrays an updated, naked femme fatale reclining in tropical vegetation next to a pig's head.

One painting at least depicts an actress playing the part of Circe. This is Franz von Stuck's striking portrait of Tilla Durieux as Circe (1913). She played this part in a Viennese revival of Calderon's play in 1912 and there is a publicity still of her by Isidor Hirsch in which she is draped across a sofa and wearing an elaborate crown. Her enticing expression and the turn of her head there is almost exactly that of Van Stuck's enchantress as she holds out the poisoned bowl. It suggests the use of certain posed publicity photos in creating the same iconic effect as had paintings in the past. A nearly contemporary example was the 1907 photo of Mme Geneviève Vix as Circe in the light opera by Lucien Hillenacher at the Opéra-Comique in Paris. The posing of the actress and the cropping of the image so as to highlight her luxurious costume demonstrates its ambition to create an effect that goes beyond the merely theatrical. A later example is the still of Silvana Mangano in her part as Circe in the 1954 film Ulysses, which is as cunningly posed for effect.

== Musical treatments ==
=== Cantata and song ===
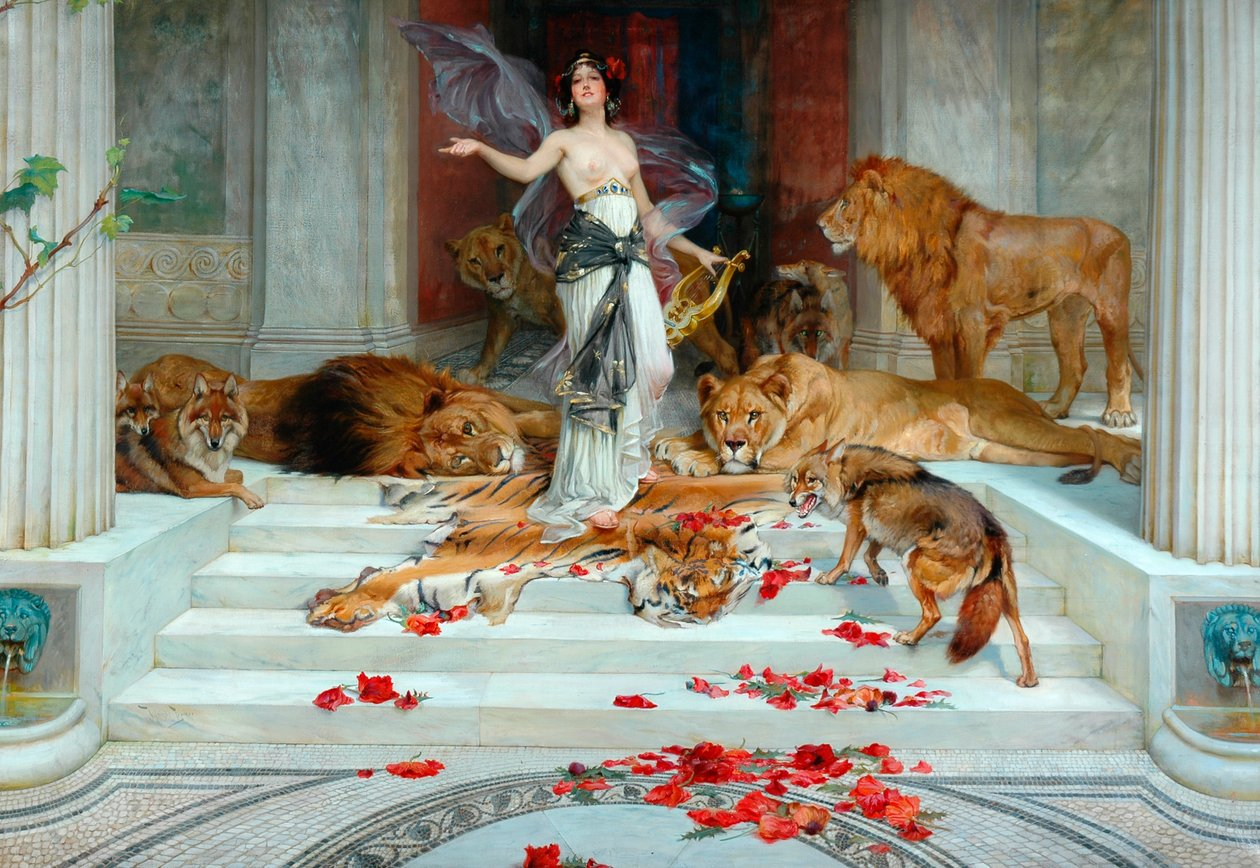
Wright Barker's 1889 painting of Circe as musician

Beside the verse dramas, with their lyrical interludes, on which many operas were based, there were poetic texts which were set as secular cantatas. One of the earliest was Alessandro Stradella's La Circe, in a setting for three voices that bordered on the operatic. It was first performed at Frascati in 1667 to honour Cardinal Leopoldo de Medici and contained references to its surroundings. In the opening recitative, Circe explains that it was her son Telegonus who founded Frascati. The other characters with whom she enters into dialogue are the south wind (Zeffiro) and the local river Algido. In the following century, Antonio Vivaldi's cantata All'ombra di sospetto (In the shadow of doubt, RV 678) is set for a single voice and depicts Circe addressing Ulysses. The countertenor part is accompanied by flute, harpsichord, cello, and theorbo and features two recitatives and two arias. The piece is famous for the dialogue created between flute and voice, conjuring the moment of flirtation before the two become lovers.

A prominent treatment of the Ulysses episode in French was Jean-Baptiste Rousseau's poem Circé (1703), that was specifically written to be a cantata. The different verse forms employed allow the piece to be divided by the musicians that set it in order to express a variety of emotions. The poem opens with the abandoned Circe sitting on a high mountain and mourning the departure of Ulysses. The sorceress then calls on the infernal gods and makes a terrible sacrifice: "A myriad vapours obscure the light, / The stars of the night interrupt their course, / Astonished rivers retreat to their source / And even Death's god trembles in the dark". But though the earth is shaken to its core, Love is not to be commanded in this way and the wintery fields come back to life.

The earliest setting was by Jean-Baptiste Morin in 1706 and was popular for most of the rest of the century. One of its final moralising minuets, Ce n'est point par effort qu'on aime (Love won't be forced) was often performed independently and the score reprinted in many song collections. The flautist Michel Blavet arranged the music for this and the poem's final stanza, Dans les champs que l'Hiver désole (In the fields that Winter wastes), for two flutes in 1720. The new setting of the cantata three years later by Francois Collin de Blamont was equally successful and made the name of its nineteen-year-old composer. Originally for voice and bass continuo, it was expanded and considerably revised in 1729, with parts for flute, violin and viol added. Towards the end of the century, the choral setting by Georges Granges de Fontenelle (1769–1819) was equally to bring its young composer fame.

Rousseau's poem was also familiar to composers of other nationalities. Set for mezzo-soprano and full orchestra, it was given almost operatic treatment by the court composer Luigi Cherubini in 1789. Franz Seydelmann set it for soprano and full orchestra in Dresden in 1787 at the request of the Russian ambassador to the Saxon Court, Prince Alexander Belosselsky, who spoke highly of Seydelmann's work. A later setting by Austrian composer Sigismond von Neukomm for soprano and full orchestra (Op. 4, 1810) was judged favorably by French musicologist Jacques Chailley in his 1966 article for the journal Revue des études slaves.

Recent treatments of the Circe theme include the Irish composer Gerard Victory's radio cantata Circe 1991 (1973–1975), David Gribble's A Threepenny Odyssey, a fifteen-minute cantata for young people which includes the episode on Circe's Isle, and Malcolm Hayes' Odysseus remembers (2003–2004), which includes parts for Circe, Anticleia and Tiresias. Gerald Humel's song cycle Circe (1998) grew out of his work on his 1993 ballet with Thomas Höft. The latter subsequently wrote seven poems in German featuring Circe's role as seductress in a new light: here it is to freedom and enlightenment that she tempts her hearers. Another cycle of Seven Songs for High Voice and Piano (2008) by the American composer Martin Hennessey includes the poem "Circe's Power" from Louise Glück's Meadowlands (1997).

There have also been treatments of Circe in popular music, in particular the relation of the Odysseus episode in Friedrich Holländer's song of 1958. In addition, text in Homeric Greek is included in the "Circe's Island" episode in David Bedford's The Odyssey (1976). This was the ancestor of several later electronic suites that reference the Odysseus legend, with "Circe" titles among them, having little other programmatic connection with the myth itself.

=== Classical ballet and programmatic music ===
After classical ballet separated from theatrical spectacle into a wordless form in which the story is expressed solely through movement, the subject of Circe was rarely visited. It figured as the first episode of three with mythological themes in Les Fêtes Nouvelles (New Shows), staged by Sieur Duplessis le cadet in 1734, but the work was taken off after its third performance and not revived. The choreographer Antoine Pitrot also staged Ulysse dans l'isle de Circée, describing it as a ballet sérieux, heroï-pantomime in 1764. Thereafter there seems to be nothing until the revival of ballet in the 20th century.

Circe enchanting Ulysses in the 2012 revival of Martha Graham's Circe

In 1963, the American choreographer Martha Graham created her Circe with a score by Alan Hovhaness. Its theme is psychological, representing the battle with animal instincts. The beasts portrayed extend beyond swine and include a goat, a snake, a lion and a deer. The theme has been described as one of "highly charged erotic action", although set in "a world where sexual frustration is rampant". In that same decade Rudolf Brucci composed his Kirka (1967) in Croatia.

There is a Circe episode in John Harbison's Ulysses (Act 1, scene 2, 1983) in which the song of the enchantress is represented by ondes Martenot and tuned percussion. After the sailors of Ullyses are transformed into animals by her spell, a battle of wills follows between Circe and the hero. Though the men are changed back, Ulysses is charmed by her in his turn. In 1993, a full scale treatment of the story followed in Gerald Humel's two-act Circe und Odysseus. Also psychological in intent, it represents Circe's seduction of the restless hero as ultimately unsuccessful. The part played by the geometrical set in its Berlin production was particularly notable.

While operas on the subject of Circe did not cease, they were overtaken for a while by the new musical concept of the symphonic poem which, whilst it does not use a sung text, similarly seeks a union of music and drama. A number of purely musical works fall into this category from the late 19th century onwards, of which one of the first was Heinrich von Herzogenberg's Odysseus (Op.16, 1873). A Wagnerian symphony for large orchestra, dealing with the hero's return from the Trojan war, its third section is titled "Circe's Gardens" (Die Gärten der Circe).

In the 20th century, Ernst Boehe's cycle Aus Odysseus Fahrten (From Odysseus' Voyage, Op. 6, 1903) was equally programmatic and included the visit to Circe's Isle (Die Insel der Circe) as its second long section. After a depiction of the sea voyage, a bass clarinet passage introduces an ensemble of flute, harp and solo violin over a lightly orchestrated accompaniment, suggesting Circe's seductive attempt to hold Odysseus back from traveling further. Alan Hovhaness' Circe Symphony (No.18, Op. 204a, 1963) is a late example of such programmatic writing. It is, in fact, only a slightly changed version of his ballet music of that year, with the addition of more strings, a second timpanist and celesta.

With the exception of Willem Frederik Bon's prelude for orchestra (1972), most later works have been for a restricted number of instruments. They include Hendrik de Regt's Circe (Op. 44, 1975) for clarinet, violin and piano; Christian Manen's Les Enchantements De Circe (Op. 96, 1975) for bassoon and piano; and Jacques Lenot's Cir(c)é (1986) for oboe d'amore. The German experimental musician Dieter Schnebel's Circe (1988) is a work for harp, the various sections of which are titled Signale (signals), Säuseln (whispers), Verlockungen (enticements), Pein (pain), Schläge (strokes) and Umgarnen (snare), which give some idea of their programmatic intent.

Thea Musgrave's "Circe" for three flutes (1996) was eventually to become the fourth piece in her six-part Voices from the Ancient World for various combinations of flute and percussion (1998). Her note on these explains that their purpose is to "describe some of the personages of ancient Greece" and that Circe was "the enchantress who changed men into beasts". A recent reference is the harpsichordist Fernando De Luca's Sonata II for viola da gamba titled "Circe's Cave" (L'antro della maga Circe).

=== Opera ===
The figure of Circe has inspired a number of opera works in different periods. One early example is La Circe by Pietro Andrea Ziani, first performed in Vienna in 1665 for the birthday of Leopold I, Holy Roman Emperor. In 1694, an opera titled Circe was composed by Henri Desmarets. In 1779, Josef Mysliveček wrote an opera seria also titled La Circe. Rolf Riehm's 2014 opera Sirenen is based on Homer's account as well as several modern texts related to the meeting of Odysseus and Circe.

== Scientific interpretations ==
In later Christian opinion, Circe was an abominable witch using miraculous powers to evil ends. When the existence of witches came to be questioned, she was reinterpreted as a depressive suffering from delusions.

In botany, the Circaea are plants belonging to the enchanter's nightshade genus. The name was given by botanists in the late 16th century in the belief that this was the herb used by Circe to charm Odysseus' companions. Medical historians have speculated that the transformation to pigs was not intended literally but refers to anticholinergic intoxication with the plant Datura stramonium. Symptoms include amnesia, hallucinations, and delusions. The description of "moly" fits the snowdrop, a flower that contains galantamine, which is a long lasting anticholinesterase and can therefore counteract anticholinergics that are introduced to the body after it has been consumed.

== Other influence ==
The gens Mamilia – described by Livy as one of the most distinguished families of Latium – claimed descent from Mamilia, a granddaughter of Odysseus and Circe through Telegonus. One of the most well known of them was Octavius Mamilius (died 498 BC), princeps of Tusculum and son-in-law of Lucius Tarquinius Superbus the seventh and last king of Rome.

- Linnaeus named a genus of the Venus clams (Veneridae) after Circe in 1778 (species Circe scripta (Linnaeus, 1758) and others).
- Her name has been given to 34 Circe, a large, dark main-belt asteroid first sighted in 1855.
- There are a variety of chess variants named Circe in which captured pieces are reborn on their starting positions. The rules for this were formulated in 1968.
- The Circe effect, coined by the enzymologist William Jencks, refers to a scenario where an enzyme lures its substrate towards it through electrostatic forces exhibited by the enzyme molecule before transforming it into a product. Where this takes place, the catalytic velocity (rate of reaction) of the enzyme may be significantly faster than that of others.

== See also ==
- Greek Magical Papyri
- Nostalgie de la boue
- Perimede – a Greek mythological witch.
- Urganda – a figure in Iberian myth often identified as Circe.

== Bibliography ==
=== Ancient ===
- Apollodorus, Apollodorus, The Library, with an English Translation by Sir James George Frazer, F.B.A., F.R.S. in 2 Volumes. Cambridge, MA, Harvard University Press; London, William Heinemann Ltd. 1921. Online version at the Perseus Digital Library.
- Apollonius of Rhodes, Argonautica; with an English translation by R. C. Seaton. William Heinemann, 1912.
- Hesiod, Theogony, in The Homeric Hymns and Homerica with an English Translation by Hugh G. Evelyn-White, Cambridge, MA., Harvard University Press; London, William Heinemann Ltd. 1914. Online version at the Perseus Digital Library.
- Homer; The Odyssey with an English Translation by A.T. Murray, Ph.D. in two volumes. Cambridge, MA., Harvard University Press; London, William Heinemann, Ltd. 1919. Online version at the Perseus Digital Library.
- Hyginus, Gaius Julius, The Myths of Hyginus. Edited and translated by Mary A. Grant, Lawrence: University of Kansas Press, 1960.
- Publius Ovidius Naso, "Remedia Amoris" in The Love Poems: The Amores, Ars Amatoria and Remedia Amoris, with an English translation by A. S. Kline. 2001. Full text available at poetryintranslation.com.
- Ovid. Metamorphoses. Translated by A. D. Melville; introduction and notes by E. J. Kenney, Oxford University Press, 2008.
- Diodorus Siculus, Bibliotheca Historica. Vol 1–2. Immanel Bekker. Ludwig Dindorf. Friedrich Vogel. in aedibus B. G. Teubneri. Leipzig. 1888–1890. Greek text available at the Perseus Digital Library.
- Parthenius of Nicaea, Parthenius of Nicaea: the poetical fragments and the Erōtika pathēmata J.L. Lightfoot, 2000, ISBN 0-19-815253-1. Reviewed by Christopher Francese at The Bryn Mawr Classical Review
- Lactantius Placidus, Commentarii in Statii Thebaida.
- Plutarch, Moralia. 16 vols. (vol. 13: 13.1 & 13.2, vol. 16: index), transl. by Frank Cole Babbitt (vol. 1–5) et al., series: "Loeb Classical Library" (LCL, vols. 197–499). Cambridge, MA: Harvard University Press, 1927–2004.
- Maurus Servius Honoratus, In Vergilii carmina comentarii. Servii Grammatici qui feruntur in Vergilii carmina commentarii; recensuerunt Georgius Thilo et Hermannus Hagen. Georgius Thilo. Leipzig. B. G. Teubner. 1881. Online version at the Perseus Digital Library.
- Strabo, The Geographica, published in Vol. II of the Loeb Classical Library edition, 1923.
- Vergil, Aeneid. Theodore C. Williams. trans. Boston. Houghton Mifflin Co. 1910. Online version at the Perseus Digital Library.

=== Modern ===
- Grimal, Pierre, The Dictionary of Classical Mythology, Wiley-Blackwell, 1996, ISBN 978-0-631-20102-1. "Circe" p. 104.
- Milton, John, Comus (A Masque Presented at Ludlow Castle, 1634), line 153 "mother Circe".
- Smith, William; Dictionary of Greek and Roman Biography and Mythology, London (1873). "Circe".
- Tripp, Edward (1970). Crowell's Handbook of Classical Mythology. New York: Thomas Y. Crowell. ISBN 069022608X.
