= Sirenen =

German opera

- Opera by Rolf Riehm
- Librettist: Rolf Riehm
- Language: German
- Based on: Odyssey and other text related to Odysseus, Circe and the Sirens
- Premiere: 14 September 2014; Oper Frankfurt

Sirenen – Bilder des Begehrens und des Vernichtens (Sirens – Images of Desire and Destruction) is an opera in three parts and eight scenes by Rolf Riehm, based on the Greek myth of Odysseus, Circe and the Sirens as told in Homer's Odyssey. It was premiered on 14 September 2014 at the Oper Frankfurt, conducted by Martyn Brabbins. The opera was published by Casa Ricordi.

== History ==
Riehm wrote his own libretto based on several texts related to the meeting of Odysseus and Circe with the Sirens as told in Homer's Odyssey. He used text elements related to the story not only from the Odyssey but also by Karoline von Günderrode, Giovanni Pascoli and Isabelle Eberhardt, illuminating various aspects of the myth. Riehm worked on the composition between 2010 and 2013. In 1994, he had composed the music theatre work Das Schweigen der Sirenen (The Silence of the Sirens) after a story by Franz Kafka for soprano and instruments.

The opera was premiered on 14 September 2014 at the Oper Frankfurt, staged by Tobias Heyder and conducted by Martyn Brabbins. The production was the result of a long collaboration of all involved. Riehm worked on the score with the conductor, making changes even during the last phase of rehearsals. The composer met the singers, especially Tanja Ariane Baumgartner and Lawrence Zazzo, who sang the two main characters, and wrote their roles for their specific voices. The opera was published by Casa Ricordi.

== Roles ==
Role	Voice type	Premiere cast, 14 September 2014 Conductor: Martyn Brabbins
Circe	mezzo-soprano	Tanja Ariane Baumgartner
Odysseus	countertenor actor	Lawrence Zazzo; Michael Mendl
Telegonos	actor	Domenic Betz
8 Sirens		Sarah Maria Sun, Annette Schönmüller, Frauke Burg, Britta Stallmeister, Barbara Zechmeister, Nina Tarandek, Maria Pantiukhova, Jessica Strong

== Music and reception ==
A review notes that all the characters are wounded, and their stories are told indirectly through mental associations. The voice of Odysseus is a mix of the actor's speaking voice and the countertenor's expressive singing. Besides strings, instruments include archaic wood planks, a musical saw, accordion and piano.

The first part of the opera plays on Circe's island Aiaia (Circe's Lamento). The second part opens with the "Siren Song". Circe, Odysseus und Telegonos dominate the final scene.
