= Academy of Performing Arts Baden-Wuerttemberg =

Coordinates: 48°53′38″N 09°11′28″E

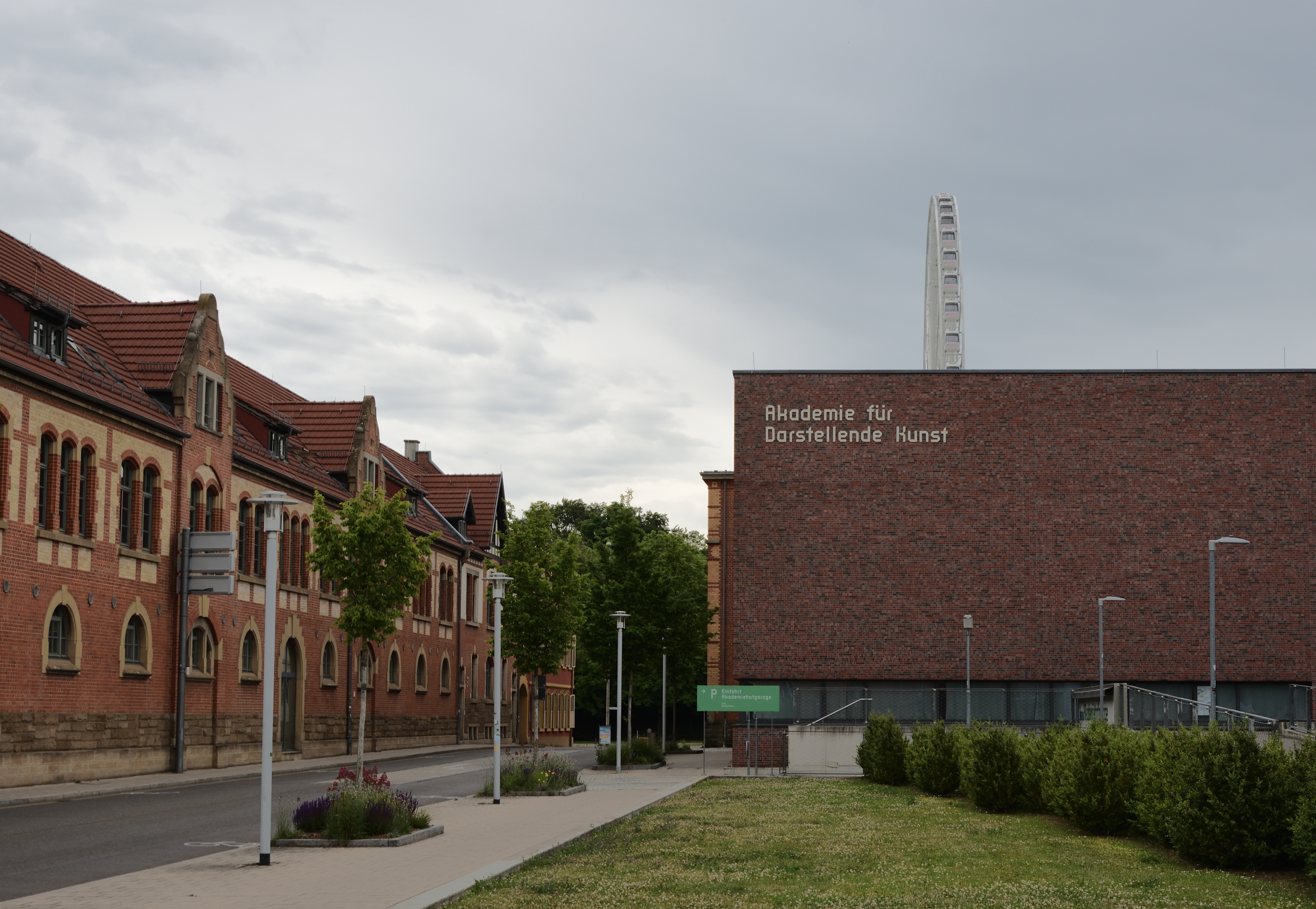
Academy of Performing Arts in June 2022

The Academy of Performing Arts Baden-Wuerttemberg (German: Akademie für Darstellende Kunst Baden-Württemberg) is a public drama school in Ludwigsburg, Germany. Founded in 2007 on the campus of the Film Academy Baden-Wuerttemberg. The Academy of Performing Arts offers an interdisciplinary education, combining acting for theater and film.
