= Rolf Riehm =

German composer and oboist (1937–2026)

- Riehm, c. 2017
- Born: 15 June 1937; Saarbrücken, Gau Saar-Palatinate, German Reich
- Died: 3 January 2026 (aged 88)
- Occupations: Composer; Oboist; Academic teacher
- Organization: Hochschule für Musik und Darstellende Kunst Frankfurt am Main
- Awards: Villa Massimo; Hindemith Prize
- Website: rolfriehm.de

Rolf Riehm (15 June 1937 – 3 January 2026) was a German composer who wrote stage and orchestral works as well as music for ensembles and solo instruments. He began as an oboist and music teacher and was later a professor of music theory at the Hochschule für Musik und Darstellende Kunst Frankfurt am Main from 1974 to 2000. He joined the wind ensemble Sogenanntes Linksradikales Blasorchester from 1976 to 1981 as oboist and arranger; they played at political demonstrations. His opera Sirenen was premiered at the Oper Frankfurt in 2014.

== Life and career ==
Riehm was born in Saarbrücken on 15 June 1937 and grew up in Frankfurt. His father, Karl Riehm, was a school music teacher, and his mother, Elly, was a piano teacher. During his schooling he served already as organist at the American Central Chapel. He completed school with the Abitur in 1957.

Riehm began to study musicology at the Universität Frankfurt. From 1958 to 1961, he studied music pedagogy, with a focus on oboe, at the Musikhochschule Frankfurt. For studies of composition, he moved to Wolfgang Fortner's master class at the Musikhochschule Freiburg.

Riehm worked first as a solo oboist. He wrote a composition for solo oboe in 1964, Ungebräuchliches, which was premiered in Frankfurt in 1965 and won him recognition at the Darmstädter Ferienkurse the following year. Riehm co-founded the Frankfurter Vereinigung für Musik in 1964. After a brief period as a school teacher, he became a lecturer at the Rheinische Musikschule in Cologne in 1968, teaching there until 1974. He was also a member of the Gruppe 8 Köln, an association of Cologne composers, from 1968 to 1972, and is counted as a composer of the Cologne School.

In 1968, he received the award Premio Marzotto and a scholarship from the Villa Massimo. From 1974 to 2000 Riehm was a professor for composition and music theory at the Hochschule für Musik und Darstellende Kunst Frankfurt am Main. From 1976 to 1981, he was a member of the Sogenanntes Linksradikales Blasorchester, a wind band for which he also wrote arrangements; they played at political protest demonstrations. He travelled to Central America, South America, Sweden and Japan for concerts, lectures and workshops. In 1992 he received the Kunstpreis des Saarlandes and in 2002 the Hindemith Prize of the City of Hanau.

From 2010, Riehm was a member of the Academy of Arts, Berlin. His writings were published under the title Texte in 2014.

Riehm's opera Sirenen had its premiere at the Oper Frankfurt in 2014. His orchestral work Die Tode des Orpheus was premiered by the Deutsche Radio Philharmonie Saarbrücken in 2017. On 27 November 2018, the Ensemble Modern held a Porträt Rolf Riehm as a Werkstattkonzert (workshop concert) in the series Happy New Ears at the Oper Frankfurt. The composer was interviewed by Klaus Zehelein, and music including Lenz in Moskau and Adieu, sirènes was performed by soprano Sarah Maria Sun and members of the Ensemble.

Riehm died on 3 January 2026, at the age of 88.

== Works ==
Riehm's compositions deal with philosophical reflection, history, myths, fairy tales, memories, and arguments in the natural sciences. They have combined elements both sublime and trivial and include socio-political findings as well as personal ingredients. His opera Sirenen, subtitled Bilder des Begehrens und des Vernichtens (Sirens, images of desire and destruction), includes text elements not only from Homer's Odyssey but also by Karoline von Günderrode, Giovanni Pascoli and Isabelle Erhardt, illuminating various aspects of the myth.

His works have been published by Ricordi, including:

=== Stage music ===
- Das Schweigen der Sirenen, premiered by Staatsoper Stuttgart (1994)
- Sirenen – Bilder des Begehrens und des Vernichtens, premiered by Oper Frankfurt (2014).

=== Orchestral works ===
- Die Erde ist eine Schale von dunklem Gold (1966/1999), 2 Bach adaptations for soprano, tenor, baritone and orchestra
- Gewidmet (1976)
- He, tres doulz roussignol joly after old French ballades and virelais (1978)
- Tänze aus Frankfurt (1980)
- O Daddy (1984)
- Berceuse (1984/85)
- Das Schweigen der Sirenen (1987) for soprano, tenor, orchestra and electronic recordings
- Les Chants de la Revolution sont des Chants de l'Amour (1989, revised in 1998) for soprano, orchestra and electronic recordings
- Schubert Teilelager (1989) for string orchestra
- Odysseus aber hörte ihr Schweigen nicht (1993)
- Shifting (1995) violin concerto
- Die Tränen des Gletschers (1998)
- Archipel Remix (1999)
- Restoring the Death of Orpheus (2000) Akkordeonkonzert
- Fremdling, rede – Ballade Furor Odysseus (2002) for mezzo-soprano, speaker and orchestra
- Die schrecklich-gewaltigen Kinder (2003) for coloratura soprano and large ensemble
- Ihr, meine und eines ruchlosen Vaters (2006) for soprano, speaker (via feed) and orchestra
- Au bord d'une source (2006) for tenor recorder, orchestra and feeds
- Wer sind diese Kinder (2009) for piano, large orchestra and playback
- Die Tode des Orpheus (2017) for countertenor and orchestra

=== Music for ensemble ===
- Uncertain Melody (1989) for eight instruments
- Double Distant Counterpoint (J. S. Bach, Kunst der Fuge, Contrapunctus XI) (1994) for large ensemble and keyboard
- Sarca – il fiume Sarca (1995) for 7 wind instruments and double bass
- Schlaf, schlaf, John Donne, schlaf tief und quäl dich nicht (1997) for violin, bass clarinet, accordion, keyboard
- Hawking (1998) for piano, bass drum and six instruments
- aprikosenbäume gibt es, aprikosenbäume gibt es (2004) for double bass clarinet, violin, trumpet, violoncello, trombone and playbacks (dedicated to Wolfgang Stryi)
- Der Faden ist gerissen (2005) for seven instrumentalists
- in der luft waren vögel, im wasser waren fische (2006) for piano and eight instruments
- Lenz in Moskau (2011) for trombone, guitar, cello, piano, two percussionists and feeds
- Der Asra (2014) for soprano and piano
- Basar Aleppo oder Die Straße nach Tyros (2015) Sound scenes for tenor saxophone, marimba, piano and playback
- Adieu, sirènes (2015) for mezzo-soprano, 2 cellos, 2 trumpets

=== Chamber music ===
- Ein Sommerabend am Lindleinsee (1976) for violin, cello, piano and playbacks
- Tempo strozzato (1978) for string quartet
- "Ich denk viel." / Mr. President / pizz / 13 (1987) for viola, cello and double bass
- Gracieusement (1990) for viola, cello and double bass
- FIORETTI Within My Bosom (2000) for clarinet, cello and piano
- Short Message Piece (2001) for flute and tenor recorder
- Adieu, Marie, mon amour – Drei Liebeslieder in den Tod (2002) for viola and accordion
- No Velvet Mute For Lullabies (2005) for four trombones
- Pasolini in Ostia (2012) for soprano, piano, cello and percussion

=== Solo music ===
- Ungebräuchliches (1964) for oboe
- Notturno für die trauerlos Sterbenden (1977) for guitar
- Don't cry, mummy isn't here anyway − memories of a temptingly morbid summer (1982) for viola
- Scheherazade (1990) for accordion
- Toccata Orpheus (1990) for guitar
- Weeds in Ophelia's Hair (1991) for alto recorder
- Push Pull (1995) for accordion
- Hamamuth – Stadt der Engel (2005) for piano
- Ach, Königin (2005) for cello
- Ton für Ton (Weiße Straßen Babylons) (2007) for double bass and clarinet
- Im Nachtigallental (2007) for cello
- So ist es (2015) for double bass and clarinet
- Ciao, carissimo Claudio oder Die Steel Drums von San Marco (2017) for piano and playback

== Discography ==
- The Contemporary Accordion Teodoro Anzellotti, Koch Schwann
- Kompositionen für Gitarre, Cybele 260.601
- Dokumentation Wittener Tage für neue Kammermusik 1997, Kulturforum Witten / WDR
- Sogenanntes Linksradikales Blasorchester, Trikont (1976–1981)
- Werke aus den Jahren 1977–1993 – Rundfunk-Sinfonieorchester Baden-Baden und Saarbrücken, conductors: Michael Gielen and Marcello Viotti, the guitarists Wilhelm Bruck and Theodor Ross as well as the Saarbrücken String Quartet. Talking Music TalkM 1006
- Machandelboom, Cybele SACD 960.501
- Das Schweigen der Sirenen / Tänze aus Frankfurt, HR
- O Daddy, col legno
- Gewidmet, cpo
- Orchesterwerke: He, très doulz roussignol joly, Schubert Teilelager, Die Erde ist eine Schale von dunkelm Gold, Cybele 860.401
- Without Compression, Cybele 260.501
- Weeds in Ophelia's Hair, Bayer-Records
- aprikosenbäume gibt es, aprikosenbäume gibt es (Theo Nabicht, ascolta) and two other works: ahi bocca, ahi lingua (Hilliard Ensemble) and schlaf, schlaf, John donne, schlaf tief und quäl dich nicht (ensemble recherche), Cybele records SACD 860.701
- Rolf Riehm Orchesterwerke: Die Tränen des Gletschers, Nuages immortels oder Focusing on Solos (Medea in Avignon) and Berceuse, SWR Symphonieorchester, Gielen, Hans Zender, telos music records TLS 128
- Rolf Riehm: Wer sind diese Kinder, Hamamuth-Stadt der Engel, Nicolas Hodges, piano, SWR Symphonieorchester, Beat Furrer, WERGO 6755 2
- Rolf Riehm: Lenz in Moskau, Im Nachtigallental, Ton für Ton (weiße Straßen Babylons), Au bord d'une source, ascolta, celiist Erik Borgir, Nabicht, Jeremias Schwarzer, hr-Sinfonieorchester, Sian Edwards, WERGO 73142
- Shifting, Guy Braunstein, violin, WDR Sinfonieorchester, conductor Dennis Russell Davies, Archipel Remix, conductor Peter Rundel, WERGO 7357 2

== Bibliography ==
- Rolf Riehm: Texte. Published by Marion Saxer (Edition Neue Zeitschrift für Musik). Schott, Mainz 2014, ISBN 978-3-7957-0868-9.
- Hans-Klaus Jungheinrich (editor): In anderen Räumen – Der Komponist Rolf Riehm (Edition Neue Zeitschrift für Musik). Schott, Mainz 2015, ISBN 978-3-7957-0896-2.
- Tadday, Ulrich, ed. (August 2018). Musik-Konzepte 182 : Rolf Riehm. Munich: edition text + kritik. ISBN 978-3-86916-710-7.
