= Battle of Mycale =

Battle that decisively ended Xerxes's invasion of Greece (479 BC)

Coordinates: 37.6909°N 27.1574°E

- Part of the Second Persian invasion of Greece and the Greek counterattack
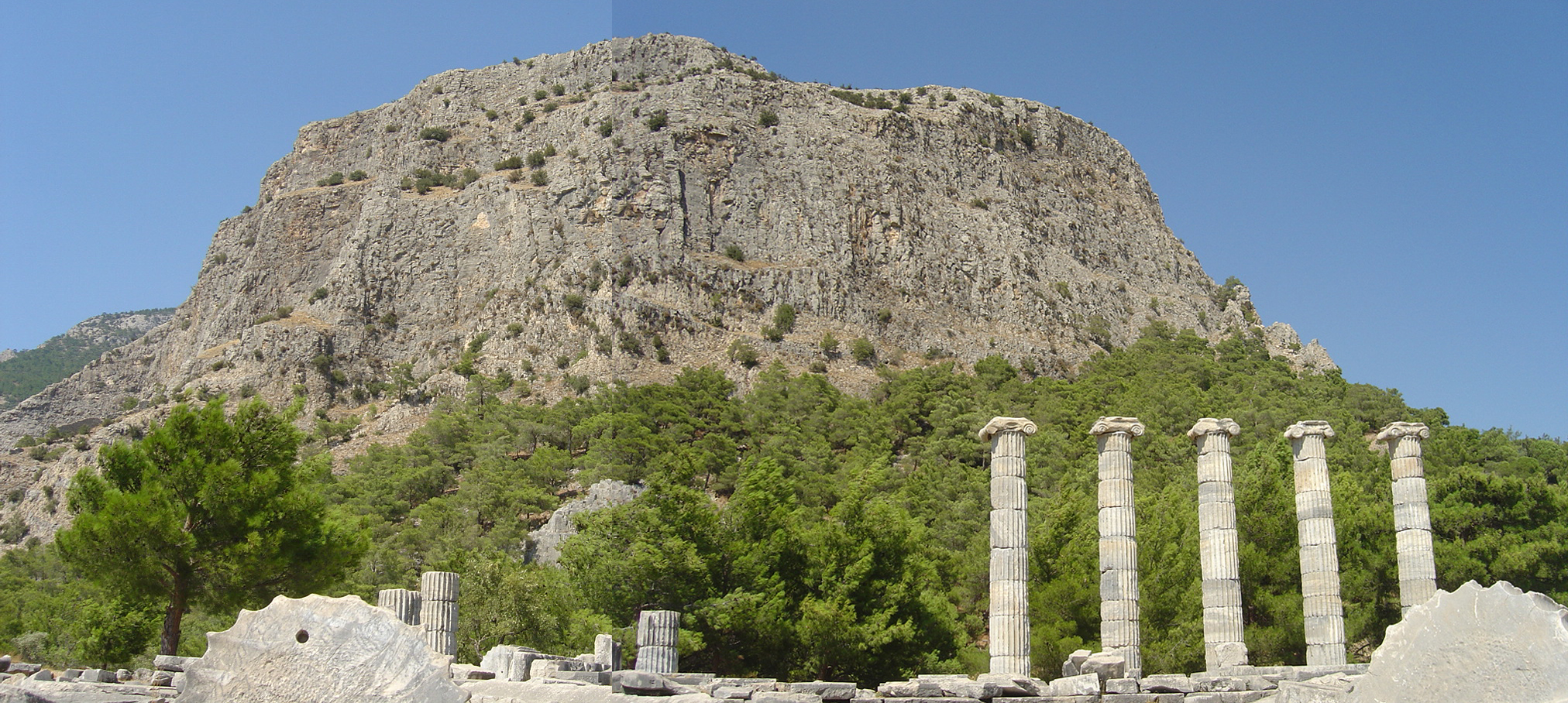
- Part of Mount Mycale, viewed from the ruins of Priene
Date	August 27 or 28, 479 BC
Location	Mycale, Ionia (modern-day Aydın, Turkey)
Result	Greek victory Ionia begins second revolt against Persian rule Effective end of the second Persian invasion of Greece
Territorial changes	Persia loses the Aegean islands

Belligerents
Greek city-states; Sparta; Athens; Corinth; Sicyon; Troezen	Achaemenid Empire

Commanders and leaders
Leotychides; Xanthippus; Perilaus †	Artaÿntes; Masistes; Ithamitres; Mardontes †; Tigranes †

Strength
10,000 – 30,000 combatants (modern estimates)	10,000 – 15,000 combatants (modern estimates)

Casualties and losses
Considerable	4,000 soldiers killed; Burning of the Persian camp and of the ships

The Battle of Mycale was one of the two major battles (the other being the Battle of Plataea) that ended the second Persian invasion of Greece during the Greco-Persian Wars. It took place on 27 or 28 August, 479 BC on the slopes of Mount Mycale, which is located on the coast of Ionia opposite the island of Samos. The battle was fought between an alliance of Greek city-states, including Sparta, Athens and Corinth; and the Persian Empire of Xerxes I.

The previous year, the Persian invasion force, led by Xerxes himself, had scored victories at the battles of Thermopylae and Artemisium, and conquered Thessaly, Boeotia and Attica; however, at the ensuing Battle of Salamis, the Greek navy had won an unlikely victory, and therefore prevented the conquest of the Peloponnese. Xerxes then retreated, leaving his general Mardonius with a substantial army to finish off the Greeks the following year.

In the summer of 479 BC, the Greeks assembled an army, and marched to confront Mardonius at the Battle of Plataea. At the same time, the Greek fleet sailed to Samos, where the demoralized remnants of the Persian navy were based. The Persians, seeking to avoid a battle, beached their fleet below the slopes of Mycale, and built a palisaded camp with the support of a Persian army unit. The Greek commander Leotychides decided to attack the Persians anyway, landing the fleet's complement of marines to do so.

Although the Persian forces put up a sturdy resistance, the heavily armored Greek hoplites eventually routed the Persian troops, who fled to their camp. The Ionian Greek contingents in the Persian army defected, and the Persian camp was attacked, with a large number of Persians slaughtered. The Persian ships were then captured and burned. The complete destruction of the Persian navy, along with the destruction of Mardonius' army at Plataea, allegedly on the same day as the Battle of Mycale, decisively ended the invasion of Greece. After Plataea and Mycale, the Greeks would take the offensive against the Persians, marking a new phase of the Greco-Persian Wars.

== Background ==
After Xerxes I was crowned the emperor of the Achaemenid Empire, he quickly resumed preparations for the invasion of Greece, including building two pontoon bridges across the Hellespont. A congress of city states met at Corinth in late autumn of 481 BC, and a confederate alliance of Greek city-states was formed. In August 480 BC, after hearing of Xerxes' approach, a small Greek army led by Spartan king Leonidas I blocked the Pass of Thermopylae, while an Athenian-dominated navy sailed to the Straits of Artemisium. The vastly outnumbered Greek army held Thermopylae against the Persian army for six days in total before being outflanked by the Persians. The Persians also achieved a costly naval triumph at the Battle of Artemisium, where they forced the Greek fleet to withdraw and thus captured the Euripus Strait.

After Thermopylae, the Persian army burned and sacked the Boeotian cities which had not surrendered, namely Plataea and Thespiae, before taking possession of the now-evacuated city of Athens. The Greek army, meanwhile, prepared to defend the Isthmus of Corinth. The ensuing naval Battle of Salamis ended in a decisive victory for the Greeks, marking a turning point in the conflict. Following the defeat of his navy at Salamis, Xerxes retreated to Asia with a minor portion of his army.

A map showing the position of Mount Mycale in relation to Lade, Samos and Miletus

The Persian fleet was stationed in Samos to defend Ionia and avert an Ionian revolt. The Persians were not expecting the Greeks to mount a naval attack on the other end of the Aegean Sea, because the Greeks had not followed through on their victory at Salamis by chasing the Persian fleet. However, the morale of the Persian fleet was breaking, and they were anxiously awaiting new reports on the status of the land army led by Mardonius. According to historian Charles Hignett, it was clear only the triumph of the Persian land army in Greece could sustain Persian rule in Ionia.

Xerxes left Mardonius with most of his army, and the latter decided to camp for the winter in Thessaly. The 110 ships of the Greek fleet were anchored at Aegina under the command of Spartan king Leotychides in the spring of 479 BC. Six people from Chios who had made an unsuccessful attempt to overthrow Strattis, their ruling tyrant, escaped to Sparta. They requested the Spartan ephors to free Ionia, and the latter sent them to Leotychides. They managed to persuade the Greek fleet to move to Delos. The Greeks hesitated to sail anywhere farther than Delos; because they were unfamiliar with the lands which lay there, thought they were full of armed peoples and believed the journey was too long. The Greek and Persian fleets stayed in their positions, apprehensive of moving closer to their opponents. Meanwhile, the Athenian navy under Xanthippus had joined with the Greek fleet off Delos.

They were then approached by a delegation from Samos under the leadership of Hegesistratos in July, who said the Ionian cities were eager to revolt. (Note: The other two members of the delegation from Samos were Lampon, son of Thrasycles; and Athenagoras of Samos, son of Archestratides.) They also pointed out the poor morale and reduced seaworthiness of the Persian fleet, (Note: Historian Charles Hignett argues the statement about the poor state of the Persian fleet was not applicable to the Ionian squadrons, which had done well at Salamis.) the latter had occurred probably due to the long time it had spent at sea. Leotychides found Hegesistratos' name to be a good omen, since it meant "Army Leader". (Note: Historian Donald Lateiner argues Leotychides had already finalized the naval expedition, but was looking for a kledon (good verbal omen) to provide religious approval of the expedition to the public.) The delegation from Samos, as envoys of their nation, pledged their loyalty to the Hellenic alliance. Leotychides and the council of war decided to exploit this opportunity and sailed for Samos. (Note: Historian Richard Evans argues they could not have stayed at Delos for a long time anyway, because the area of Delos was too small, and water and food were in short supply. Evans claims the Greeks could not have stayed at Delos for more than a day, and most probably did not go to Delos at all because of logistical problems, instead choosing to dock at Naxos or other islands nearby.) The route he took probably began from the Cyclades, then involved sailing for approximately 40 kilometers (22 nautical miles), passing Icaria and Coressia to finally land near Mount Ampelus in Samos.

The Persians withdrew from Samos; Hignett argues that by doing so, they left to the Greeks an advantageous post which was the strongest on the Ionian coast. The Persians at Samos had control of the best harbor in all of the Aegean Sea and a great water supply. Historian John Barron argues their retreat was not absurd: the channel was just about 1 kilometre (0.62 mi) wide at its thinnest point, therefore, the Greeks could not send their entire fleet after the Persians. But the Persians did not force a battle, and did not move to the excellent harbor at Miletus, instead choosing to land at Mycale, where Barron says they could observe the Greeks but the Greeks could not see them. Barron notes the absolute breakdown of the Persians' will to fight at this point.

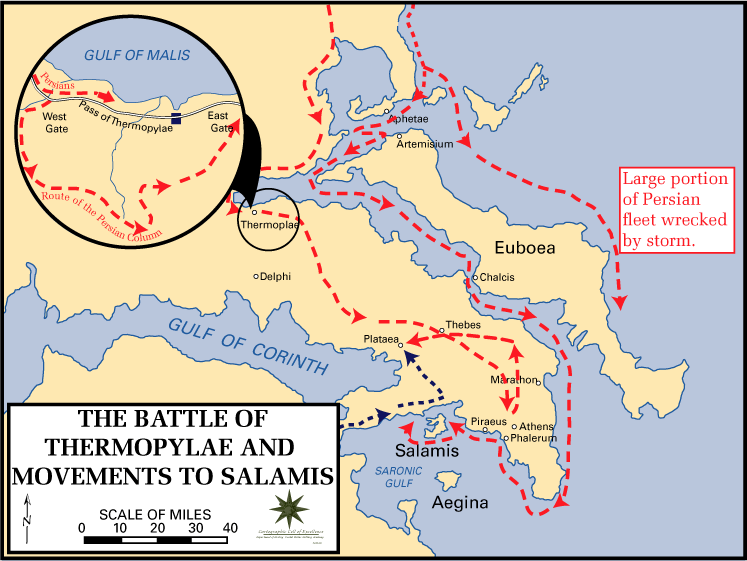
Movements of the Persian and Greek armies in 480–479 BC

Classicists Michael Flower and John Marincola argue the Greeks decided to sail to Samos only because they were told about a potential Ionian revolt and the disrepair of the Persian fleet. They note the Greeks were previously quite hesitant to sail beyond Delos because of the Persian fleet. Historian Marcello Lupi also notes the Greek fleet sailed at the insistence of the Samians and was unwilling to chase the Persians after Salamis, hesitating to move out of Delos. Flower and Marincola argue the envoys from Samos were more reliable than the envoys from Chios, since the latter were "conspirators on the run" while the former were the representatives of their people. They note Hegesistratos claimed there was a chance the Persian fleet could be seized with one maneuver. They argue Leotychides considered this a risk he could take. They also note the Greek fleet had already sailed for Samos when their ambassadors reported the dismissal of the Phoenician ships from the Persian fleet.

Historian Peter Green argues the Phoenician ships were dismissed either to defend the shores of Thrace and the Dardanelles; or because the Persian high command could not trust the Phoenicians after Salamis. Barron argues the Phoenicians were dismissed due to their low morale. Historian Jack Balcer observes the error of the Persians in dismissing the Phoenicians, and claims the battle would have unfolded differently if the Phoenicians were not dismissed. Hignett argues Leotychides was taking the risk of fighting a naval battle where the location and circumstances would be picked by the Persians, who could thus maximize their advantages. Barron argues that passing over the opportunity to destroy their opponent's fleet would be an absurd decision to make for both the Persians and the Greeks, especially since the land war was coming to a close, and because both sides would be expecting the mustering of their opponent's flotillas. Balcer notes the original mission of the Greek fleet was not letting the Persian fleet reinforce Mardonius, and how the fleet took a bold decision to go on the offensive.

== Opposing forces ==
=== Persians ===
Ancient historian Herodotus gives the size of the Persian fleet which wintered at Cyme at 300 ships. The Phoenician ships were dismissed from the Persian fleet before the battle, which reduced its strength. Historian Charles Hignett found the fleet size of 300 ships to be too large, even if this number included the Phoenician ships. Green estimates there were approximately just 100 ships in the Persian fleet after the Phoenicians left. Barron also arrives at an estimate of 100 ships after the dismissal.

Tigranes was the commander of the Persian land forces at Mycale. Artaÿntes was the joint commander of the Persian fleet, and he appointed his nephew Ithamitres as the third commander for the fleet. Herodotus states there were 60,000 soldiers in the Persian army at Mycale. Hignett argues Herodotus' own narrative of the battle contradicts these numbers, and claims Tigranes could not have had more than 10,000 soldiers in his unit. Shepherd also estimates Tigranes had around 10,000 soldiers; with an additional 3,000 Persian infantry who had disembarked from the ships. Shepherd also notes Tigranes notably did not have cavalry contingents among his troops. Green estimates Tigranes had only 6,000 soldiers with him, who were joined by the 4,000 marines in the Persian fleet, for a total of 10,000 combatants. Historian Richard Evans estimates there were around 4,000 total Persian combatants.

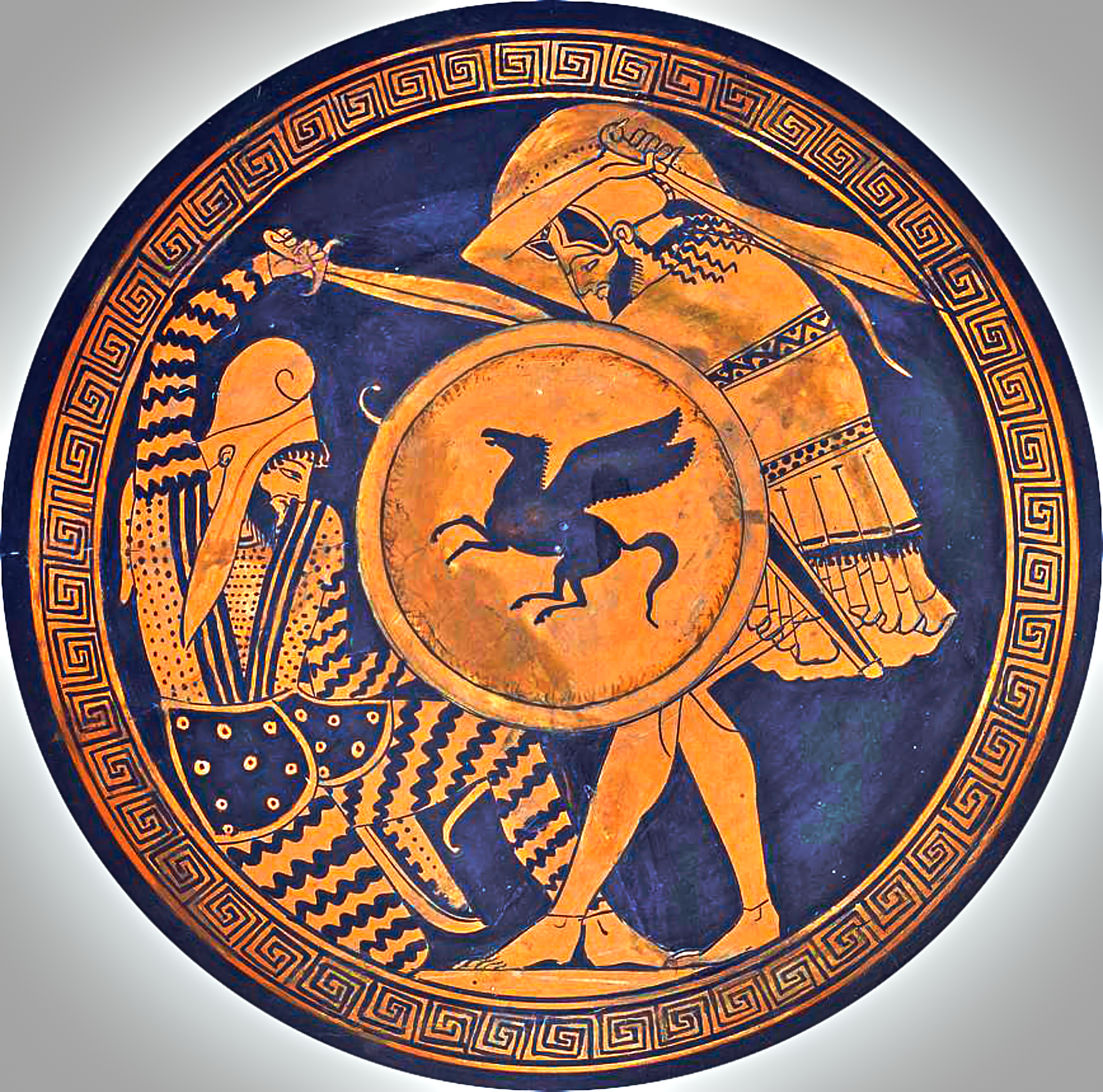
Greek hoplite (right) and Persian warrior (left), depicted fighting each other. Ancient kylix, 5th century BC

=== Greeks ===
Historian Andrew Robert Burn estimates the Greek fleet had 110 ships. Burn notes that the figure of 250 ships is only stated by Ephorus. Flower and Marincola argue the Athenians did not have the numbers to provide marines for 50 triremes and 8,000 hoplites at Plataea both at the same time. They argue the claim of 250 Greek ships is therefore not realistic. Herodotus did not give a precise order of battle for Mycale in his account. Historian William Shepherd estimates Athens provided one-third of the ships; while Sparta and the Peloponnesian poleis may have contributed 10 and 20–30 ships respectively. Shepherd estimates Aegina and Corinth sent 10 ships each. Historian David Asheri posits the Athenians contributed 50 ships to the Greek fleet at Mycale. An epigram from an agora (public square) in Megara says Megarians fought and suffered casualties in the battle of Mycale, but they are not mentioned in any account of the battle.

The standard complement of a trireme was 200 people, including 14 marines. Flower and Marincola estimate the Greeks had 3,300 marines, with the 110 ships having 30 marines each. They note the complement of marines on a trireme was probably not fixed, with Plutarch stating there were 14 marines on each trireme at Salamis. Herodotus had said the Chian ships at the Battle of Lade carried 40 marines each. Hignett also arrives at an estimate of 3,300 marines in the Greek force. He argues there could not have been more than 6,000 marines, even if there were hoplites employed as rowers. Burn notes the Greek contingent of marines was strong, and argues some of the Greek oarsmen served as light infantry. Historian George Cawkwell argues the Greeks had only 2,000 to 3,000 marines, because their ships had mostly naval personnel on board. Flower and Marincola also note Leotychides and Xanthippus probably had equal powers, and posit military decisions were finalized by a majority vote.

Shepherd argues the Greek contingent at Mycale did not have more than 25,000 soldiers. Shepherd arrives at an estimate of 3,000 marines with 30 on each ship; and argues the remaining 22,000 people on board served mostly as light infantry, with some of them being employed as hoplites. Green's estimate for the number of Greek combatants was 5,000 heavy infantry (rigid, heavily armed infantry), and 2,000 to 3,000 sailors serving as light infantry. Evans estimates there were 70 Athenian, 8 Spartan, 20 Corinthian, 3 Troezenian and 8 Sicyonian ships in the Greek fleet at Mycale. Supposing each ship had 10 hoplites on board, he comes up with the following order of battle: 700 hoplites from Athens, 200 from Corinth, 80 from Sicyon, 30 from Troezen and 80 from Sparta (probably helots); for a total of 1,100 hoplites. The triremes did not have weapons on board for the 170 oarsmen who staffed them, and so the oarsmen probably used whatever weapons and armor they could find, assuming they did fight.

== Prelude ==
When the Persians heard the Greek fleet was approaching, they set sail from Samos towards Mycale in the Ionian mainland, possibly because they had decided they could not fight a naval battle. During the chaos of their retreat, the Samians freed 500 Athenian captives. Burn argues the Persian fleet anchored at Mycale because their commanders thought it would be "useless to fight at sea". The Persian fleet moved from Samos to Mycale for protection according to Herodotus. Green argues the Persians retreated to Mycale because they could communicate easily with Sardis and retreat without trouble. The Persians arrived on the southern shore of Mycale, near a temple dedicated to the two Potnia (female goddesses), Demeter and Kore (Persephone). Another temple dedicated to Eleusinian Demeter was nearby; three temples dedicated to these same goddesses were also present on or near the battlefield of Plataea.

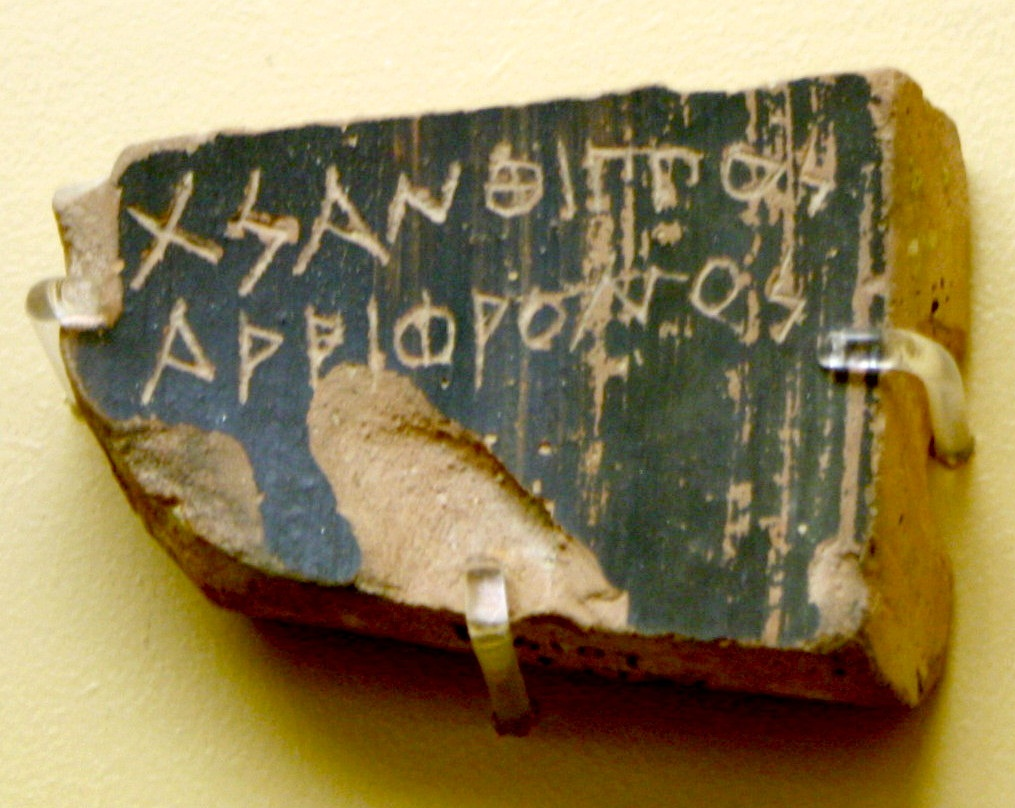
An ostracon (a piece of pottery inscribed with the name of a person the inscriber wanted to exile) which mentions Xanthippus and is dated to 484 BC

The Persians took away the armor and weapons of the Samians in their army, finding them unreliable. Furthermore, they sent the Milesians to their rear to guard the mountain passes of Mycale, suspecting the Milesians wanted to defect. Hignett argues the Persian distrust of the Milesians was invented later, and notes the Milesians were actually guarding the lines of communication and the mountain passes the Persians could use to retreat. To the south of these passes, on the beaches on the route from Samos, the Persians moored their fleet behind the cover of rocks, and built abatis (field fortifications) with the wood they had cut recently. They put up stakes (skolopes) on the ramparts, and as a result, the place where they camped became known as Skolopoeis by Herodotus' time. With their preparations in place, the Persians decided to defend their position, primarily expecting a siege.

The camp was located near the Gaison river. German archaeologist Theodor Wiegand suggested Domatia (modern day Doğanbey, Söke) as the site for the camp; while German classicist Johannes Kromayer proposed a site near the modern village of Ak Bogaz. Shepherd proposes the village of Atburgazı as the site for the Persian camp and battlefield. Historian Jan Zacharias van Rookhuijzen suggests Güllübahçe, Söke, the modern site of the ancient city of New Priene, as another potential location for the battlefield of Mycale. German philologist Dietram Müller suggested a location between Atburgazı and Yuvaca, Söke as the site for the battlefield.

The Greeks encamped at Kalamoi (the Reeds), adjacent to the Heraion of Samos and around 5 kilometers (3.1 mi) from the city. Their opponent was inactive, and thus they were planning to not fight a battle and instead attack the Persian communications center at the Hellespont. However, they decided to attack their opponent and their fleet, and moved towards Mycale, around 1 mile (1.6 km) from Samos by the naval route. Hignett argues this decision indicated the Greeks were sure they could fight a decisive battle. The Greeks prepared for a naval battle in case the Persians decided to fight at sea, but they had resolved to confront the Persian land army in case there was no naval battle. The Greek fleet moved towards the shore and called on the Ionians to revolt. The Greeks then sailed further and their soldiers landed in a location beyond the line of sight of their opponents. Shepherd estimates this location was 3,000–4,000 meters (9,800–13,100 ft) inside the bay and to the immediate west of the city of Priene. Herodotus reports that when the Greeks approached the Persian camp, rumor spread among them of a Greek victory at Plataea earlier on in the day. (Note: Diodorus' account had a gap of one day between the Greek landing and the battle, Herodotus had the battle commencing on the same day after the Greek landing. Historian Richard Evans argues the logistical requirements of the Greek landing imply Diodorus' account was more accurate on this point.)

== The battle ==
The Greeks probably formed into two wings. On the left were the Athenians, Corinthians, Sicyonians and Troezenians; around half of the army, who took up positions starting from the shore and ending at the foothills of Mount Mycale. On the right were the Spartans with the other contingents, deployed on the hills in uneven terrain. (Note: Evans posits the Athenians and the others formed the right wing while the Spartans formed the left wing.) The battle of Mycale commenced in the afternoon on the same day as the battle of Plataea, which historian Paul A. Rahe estimates took place on 27 or 28 August. Hignett also proposes a date in late August. The battle began when the Greek left began fighting with the Persians while their right wing was still crossing the hills. The Persians moved out from their camp and put up their shield wall. Burn argues Tigranes wanted to vanquish half of the Greeks facing him while the other half had still not arrived on the battlefield. Green argues sending only the flank led by the Athenians at first was actually a tactical move by Leotychides, who wanted the Persians to think they had a large advantage in numbers. Green claims the Persians fell for the ruse and rushed to attack the Greeks.

The Greek right, under heavy arrow fire, decided to fight in close quarters. Until the Persian shield wall was not broken, the Persians defended their position. At this point, the contingents on the Greek right encouraged each other by saying the victory should belong to them and not to the Spartans. They increased their efforts, and managed to break through the wall by shoving. Tigranes and Mardontes died in the ensuing combat. The Persians fought back initially, but then broke their lines and escaped to their camp. The soldiers of the right wing followed them into the camp, and most of the Persian soldiers fled from the camp except the ethnic Persian troops, who grouped together and fought the Greek soldiers who entered the camp. Finally, the left wing arrived, outflanking the camp and falling on the rear of the remaining Persian forces, thereby completing the rout.

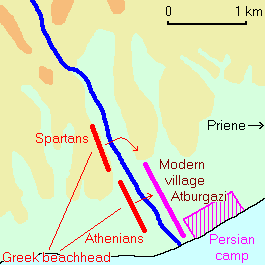
Schematic diagram of the Battle of Mycale

Herodotus says the disarmed Samians joined the Greeks on seeing the outcome of the battle hung in the balance. This inspired the other Ionian contingents to turn on the Persians as well. Meanwhile, the Milesians who were guarding the passes of Mycale also turned on the Persians. At first, they misdirected the fleeing Persian contingents, who then ended up back among the Greeks troops; then, perhaps seeing the outcome of the battle was certain, they began killing the fleeing Persians. The Greeks then burned the Persian fleet after a heavily contested fight with the Persian marines, after taking out the loot from the ships and placing it on the beach. The Persian fortifications were also burnt.

Herodotus does not mention specific figures for casualties, merely saying losses were heavy on both sides. The Sicyonians in particular suffered, also losing their general Perilaus. On the Persian side, admiral Mardontes and general Tigranes were both killed, though Artaÿntes and Ithamitres escaped. Green estimates the Persian casualties at 4,000. Hermolycus, an Athenian from the deme (suburb) of Scambonidae, was considered to have been the most gallant Greek soldier during the battle. The Athenians were considered the most courageous contingent on the battlefield, followed by the soldiers of Corinth, Troezen and Sicyon.

== Aftermath ==
With the twin victories of Plataea and Mycale, the second Persian invasion of Greece was over. Moreover, the threat of a future invasion was abated; although the Greeks were worried Xerxes would try again, over time it was apparent the Persian desire to conquer Greece was much diminished. The Greeks returned to Samos and discussed their next moves. The Greek fleet then moved to the Hellespont, sailed first to Lecton and then to Abydos to break down the pontoon bridges, but found them destroyed.

The Peloponnesians sailed home, but the Athenians remained to attack the Chersonesos, still held by the Persians. The Persians in the region and their Greek vassals made for Sestos, the strongest town in the region, and the Athenians laid siege to them there. After a protracted siege, Sestos fell to the Athenians, marking the beginning of a new phase in the Greco-Persian Wars, the Greek counterattack. The city-states of Chios, Lesbos and Samos joined the Hellenic alliance, and their Persian garrisons were eliminated. Strattis of Chios was overthrown, and it is highly likely the family of the poet Ion of Chios played a role. The Greeks could not subdue Ionia entirely and could only free the Aegean islands. However, Thrace and Macedonia were able to break their alliance with the Persians because of the Greek victories at Plataea and Mycale. Also, the coastal areas of Lydia (Sparda), and the Asiatic Greek polities stretching from the Troad to Caria split off from the Persians.

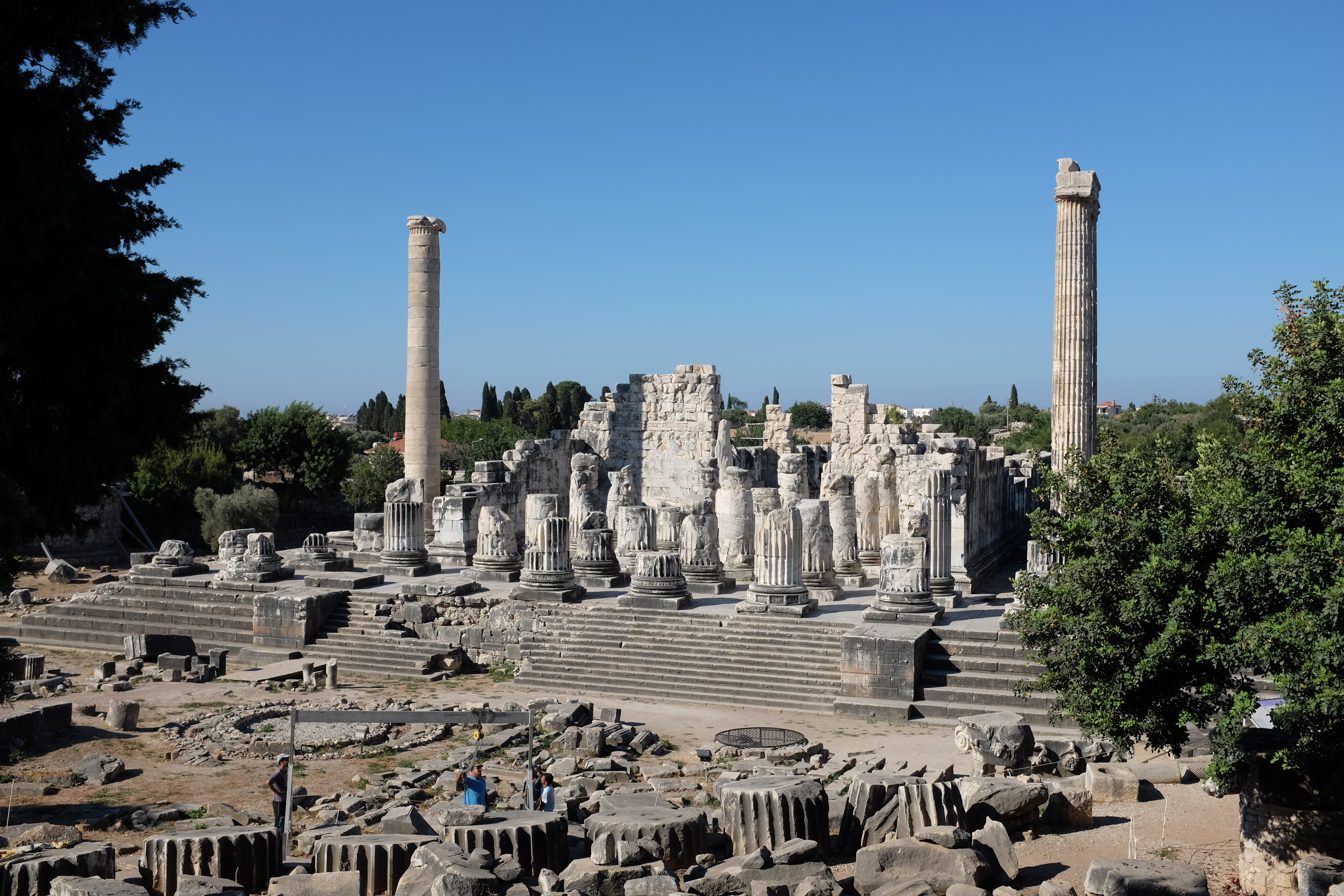
The temple of Apollo at Didyma, destroyed by Xenagoras of Halicarnassus, as revenge for Miletus switching sides at Mycale

After the battle, there were concerns over how the Greeks of Asia Minor could be defended against potential Persian vengeance. The Peloponnesians suggested a population exchange, where the Greeks who did not want to live under Persian rule would be relocated in northern Greece, on the properties of the medizers who would be expelled. However, since all of northern Greece had surrendered to the Persians, this plan was abandoned. Also, Xanthippus claimed the Greeks of Asia Minor were Athenian settlers, and thus Athens would not let their settlements be abandoned. Historian Joshua Nudell argues this debate over the Ionians presaged the future war between Athens and Sparta, namely the Peloponnesian War.

Rahe argues the real reason Athens tried to make its settlers stay in Ionia was to ensure they could defend Athenian food imports from Crimea. Burn found this idea of a population exchange to have parallels with the population exchange between Greece and Turkey implemented 24 centuries later. Burn also found a repeat of the Battle of Mycale in the Battle of the Eurymedon, fought by the Athenian general Cimon against the Persians in 466 BC. After Mycale, the state of Teos would create multiple imprecations to be used on people who exploited the role of the aesymnetes (elected official) to become tyrants.

After the battle, Persian marshal Masistes would accuse surviving naval commanders of being cowards; Burn, however, argues they survived because they were just trying to get their non-Persian soldiers back to the battlefield. In the spring of 488 BC, the tyrant of Cilicia, Xenagoras of Halicarnassus, recently appointed by emperor Xerxes, raided the temple of Apollo at Didyma and seized the bronze idol of the deity, in revenge for the Milesians switching sides at Mycale. Historian Iain Spence argues the victory at Mycale reiterated the maritime supremacy of the Greeks. He further argues the resultant defection of the Aegean states facilitated Greek marine campaigns, thus leading to the establishment of the naval empire of the Delian League and Athens. The Persian Empire's borders were fixed and their successive invasions became rare. After the Persian defeat at Mycale, the satrapy of Bactria began an armed revolt, which may have bolstered the resolve of Artabanus to assassinate Xerxes.

Historian David C. Yates notes the exclusion of the states of Samos and Chios from the list of states on the Serpent Column, even though both had a strong claim. He argues they were excluded because they opposed continued Spartan command of the Hellenic League. Yates also notes the presence of Spartan and Corinthian troops in all five battles of the Persian Wars, the only two states to have this distinction.

=== Spoils ===
Xanthippus captured the cables of the Persian bridges in Cardia after he took the town. Barron posits these cables adorned the stylobates (column bases) of the newly built Temple of Athena Nike on the Acropolis of Athens. Fragments from the cables, mixed with stern decorations taken from the Persian ships at Mycale, were displayed at Delphi near the terrace walls of the Temple of Apollo. An inscription near these displays said the Athenians captured these items from the enemy, without mentioning the other Greek allies. The 4th century BC Athenian orator Demosthenes thought the 30 feet (9.1 m) tall statue of Athena Promachos (forefighter), completed c. 450 BC and displayed on the Acropolis of Athens, was constructed with money from the loot taken at Plataea and Mycale. According to Roman engineer Vitruvius, the "masts and spars" of the Persian ships were incorporated into the roof of the Odeon of Pericles theatre at Athens.

== Analysis ==
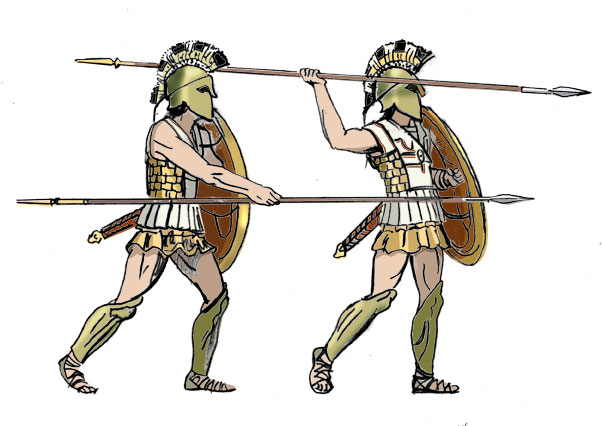
An illustration of the overhand and underhand attack positions of the hoplites

Flower and Marincola observe many of the predictions made by Hegesistratos did not materialise: the Ionians did not revolt when the Greeks arrived in Ionia, and did so only after the people of Samos and Miletus rebelled first. They note how odd it was for the Persians to not have attacked the Greeks while the latter were landing. They quote 5th century BC Athenian general Demosthenes, who said a naval landing could not be executed when an opponent who held the land resolved to fight.

Balcer argues the Persians should have deployed their fleet in the open sea and should not have built their fortifications. He further argues the Persian defeats were the results of military and logistical mistakes committed by the Persians. Historian George Cawkwell argues the numbers given by Herodotus are highly overstated. He further argues the battle was a "very minor affair", but its outcomes were major because it led to an Ionian revolt. Cawkwell observes the withdrawal of the majority of the Persian fleet just before the battle of Mycale was a grave mistake. Cawkwell claims Tigranes didn't have many soldiers with him. He argues the Persian fleet did not have the required number of soldiers to fight the Greek fleet, and sailed to Mycale only because of the presence of Tigranes' troops.

Burn argues the destruction of the Persian fleet at Mycale allowed the Greek fleets absolute freedom of movement. Historian Muhammad Dandamayev agrees with this conclusion. The Persian and Median marines, as well as the Persian units in Tigranes' army, were almost completely massacred. In their absence, the Persian vassals refused to fight and fled. (Note: The presence of 30 Persian marines on board each Persian ship did not allow the Greek vassal soldiers onboard to rebel.) Historian Paul A. Rahe argues the Persians had ten months since the battle of Salamis to repair their fleet. He further argues the Persian hesitation to fight a naval battle, despite their numerical superiority, indicated that either the morale of their commanders was shaken, or they believed the soldiers in their army drawn from their Greek vassals would mutiny. Rahe argues emperor Xerxes could be the one who ordered his soldiers not to fight a naval battle, and instead beach their ships.

Historian J. B. Bury argues the indecisiveness of the Spartans led to the Greeks of Asia Minor joining the Delian League led by Athens. He argues the Spartans left the Greeks of Asia Minor unprotected against the Persians, even though the latter had proposed the creation of a Hellenic League after Mycale. The hesitation of the Spartans to defend the Ionians and the resolve of Athens to do so led to the competition and strife between the two superpowers during the 5th century BC.

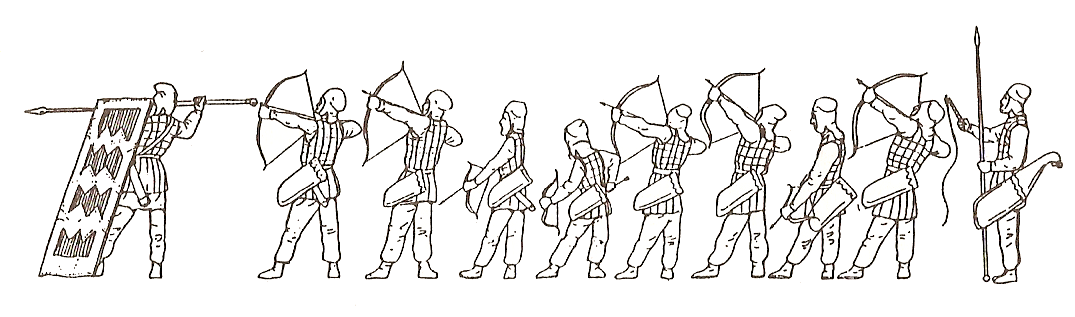
A typical Persian formation, ten ranks deep with sparabara (heavy infantry) in front, eight archers in the middle and a supervisor at the back

Historian Amir Mehdi Badi wonders why the Spartans, forever hesitant of embarking on naval campaigns to remote places, immediately agreed to sail to Samos after the visit of the envoys. Badi observes how strange it is for the Spartans to fight for the liberation of the Ionians at a time when the Greek mainland was still under Persian occupation. According to Diodorus Siculus, it was actually the Samians who persuaded the Greeks to attack the Persian fleet. Badi also questions the narrative of the Greek fleet mobilizing and sailing from Delos to Samos in one day, and says even a modern navy cannot move so quickly. Historian Herman Tammo Wallinga says the Greek triumph at Mycale was a strategic "feat of the first order", however, it was probably not appreciated by contemporary Greeks. He argues most members of the Greek fleet were volunteers, enticed by the spoils they could take. Wallinga argues the Persian commanders made a reasonable decision by stowing their ships, because they could then be used in the future, instead of risking them in a one-sided battle where the Persians had the numerical advantage but the morale of their crews was broken.

=== Formations ===
Historian Richard Evans estimates the length of the beach in Mycale at 20–30 meters (66–98 ft) during low tide. Evans argues the small beach restricted the deployment of a phalanx with a uniform depth of ranks. He posits the Greeks used a wedge formation, with 700 Athenian hoplites deploying 50 ranks deep while the others deployed ten ranks deep. Assuming each hoplite took up 1 meter (3.3 ft) of space, he estimates the Athenians deployed 14 rows and formed a line 14 meters (46 ft) wide. Similarly, he expects the Corinthians deployed 20 rows, the Sicyonians and Spartans deployed 8 rows each, and the Troezenians deployed 3 rows. Evans then estimates the Greek line was 53–58 meters (174–190 ft) long.

== Historiography ==
The main source for the Greco-Persian Wars is ancient Greek historian Herodotus. He gives an account of the battle of Mycale in Book Nine of his Histories. Historian Detlev Fehling noted multiple similarities in Herodotus' accounts, which he argued were arbitrary insertions by Herodotus. Fehling noted the Spartan nauarch (fleet commander) at Mycale used the same plan used by Themistocles at the Battle of Artemisium, and the Ionian tyrants at the Battle of Lade: calling upon the Ionians to switch sides. Fehling also notes how the shield wall fighting is always concluded by the Athenians in Herodotus' accounts, especially at Plataea and Mycale. Shepherd also notes the multiple similarities between Plataea and Mycale. However, he finds some major differences in the latter battle: the absence of cavalry; the Persian command's lack of trust in their Greek vassal soldiers resulting in a lower force strength; and the reversal of Plataea at Mycale where the Greeks were the attackers and the Persians were the defenders.

Classicists Michael Flower and John Marincola also found these similarities between the battles of Plataea and Mycale to be suspicious, especially since the victories there gave both Sparta and Athens, respectively, similar triumphs on the same day. Flower and Marincola note the victory at Mycale was not celebrated by any Athenian orators, who were otherwise proud of their other achievements in the Persian Wars. They argue this omission occurred because the leader at Mycale was a Spartan in what could be considered a naval battle, a domain where the Athenians believed they were better. Flower and Marincola note how the aristeia (heroic moment) of the Athenians takes place on Ionian lands, and wonder whether this part of Herodotus' account is structured to justify the Athenian claim to command of the Delian League. Flower and Marincola find the account of Mycale given by Diodorus Siculus to be unreliable and mixed with arbitrary claims by Ephorus of Cyme, his primary source. Timaeus may also be a source for Diodorus. Flower and Marincola note that in Herodotus' account, he mentions the burial of the fallen Greek soldiers after the battle of Thermopylae, but does not mention any burials after the battles of Mycale, Salamis or Marathon.

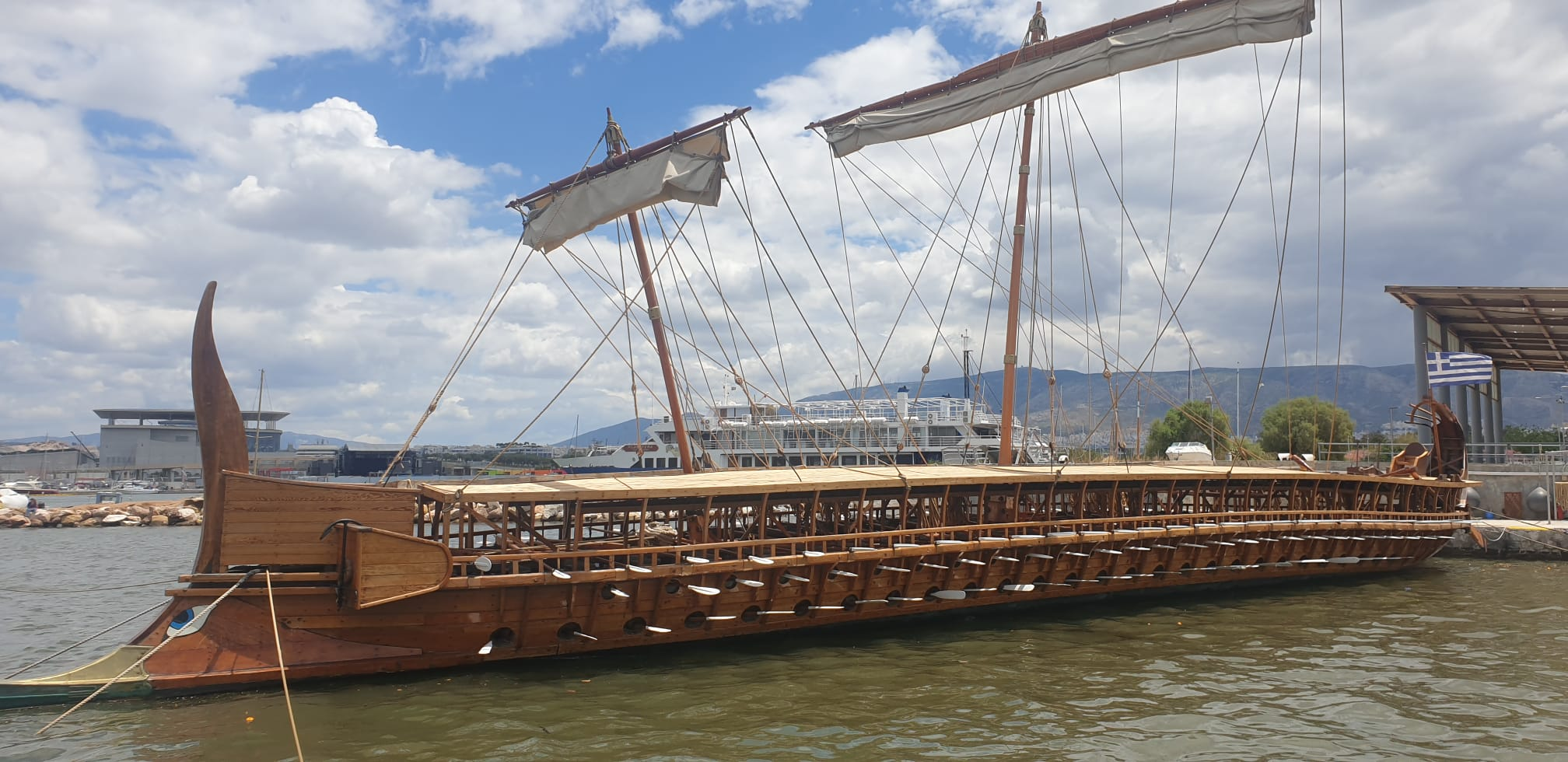
Olympias, a full-scale reconstruction of an ancient Athenian trireme. Schiffsmuseum Trokadero Marina, Athens

Historian David Asheri found other similarities between Plataea and Mycale: the issue of defending the mountain passes, the deployment of the Athenians on the plains and the Spartans on the hills, the concluding heroic resistance of the few remaining Persian fighters and the delayed arrival of other Greek contingents on the battlefield. Asheri also noted a direct comparison between the battles of Mycale and Artemisium. Asheri argues the battle of Mycale was narrated by Herodotus from a religious perspective, and not from a strategic and military perspective. Asheri postulates Herodotus used sources from Athens and Samos because of the biases towards these poleis in his account. Nudell argues the Ionian betrayal of the Persians is overstated, and perhaps invented to salvage the reputation of Greek states which fought for the Persians.

Historian Henry Immerwahr posits the battles of Plataea and Mycale are connected in a manner similar to how the battles of Thermopylae and Artemisium are connected. Badi also made note of these narrative structures, where a land battle and naval battle are fought on the same day. Immerwahr notes the Athenians at Mycale are shown to be better combatants on land than the Spartans, which he believes to be a result of drawing from a pro-Athenian source. Hellanicus of Lesbos is probably the pro-Athenian and anti-Spartan source used by Herodotus.

Immerwahr notes the Athenian victory at Mycale offsets their defeat at Artemisium. Badi argues Herodotus clubbed his account of Mycale with Plataea because he wanted to "superimpose" an Athenian victory on a Spartan one. Badi argues the Athenian victory at Mycale was also given more prestige in Herodotus' account, because the victor was not forced to retreat from their position at any time, unlike at Plataea. Immerwahr observes how the divine was the key element in the accounts of Plataea and Mycale given by Herodotus, whose narrative of the latter battle did not focus at all on military matters. Historian Richard Evans argues Herodotus based his account of Mycale on battle descriptions in Homer's Iliad. Evans also notes the multiple parallels between Mycale and Thermopylae. Evans notes Mycale was the first battle in recorded history fought on a beach.

Historian Jan Zacharias van Rookhuijzen notes how Plutarch is the only ancient writer who described the victory at Mycale as something the Athenians took pride in. Plutarch, in his account, also noted the Corinthian gallantry at Mycale. van Rookhuijzen notes how most ancient writers did not give the battle much thought, with Ephorus of Cyme being the only one who considered it to have some importance. Modern historians like Hignett and Cawkwell claim Herodotus did not have much interest in the battle. Herodotus probably concluded his account with the battle of Mycale and the second Ionian revolt because he wanted to come full circle on the commencement of his account with the first Ionian Revolt.

Burn found Herodotus' account to be biased towards the Athenians. He also finds the battle of Mycale to have parallels with Plataea, as both battles saw only one flank engaged in combat, and both witnessed fighting at the Persian shield walls and camps. Hignett argues the similarities between the two battles are not suspicious and can naturally be expected. Burn says Mycale was a "relatively small battle", and notes Thucydides did not consider it as important as Salamis or Artemisium. In the works of tragic poet Phrynichus, the naval victories at Salamis and Mycale were the results of policies crafted by the Athenian commander Themistocles. Historian Franz Stoessl says Phyrnichus formed his opinions on the Persian Wars by emphasizing the two triumphs of the Greek navy at Salamis and Mycale. Athenian tragedian Aeschylus believed Europeans and Asians should not cross the seas and intervene in each other's countries. Stoessl says this is the reason for Aeschylus not even mentioning the battle of Mycale, because it was fought in Asia Minor.

=== Ships ===
Historian Iain McDougall doubts the narrative of the Persian ships being burnt after the Greek victory at Mycale. He argues the ships were valuable loot, and notes how there is no historical precedent for such actions. German classicist Karl Julius Beloch thought the Persians burned their ships themselves; Italian historian Giulio Giannelli thought the Athenians and especially Themistocles burnt the ships, while Hignett thought only the Ionian ships in the Persian fleet were spared. McDougall argues the ships in the Persian fleet which were burnt primarily belonged to the Ionian Greeks, who he argues contributed most of the ships present at Mycale. McDougall further argues the ships in the Persian fleet were greatly damaged and could not be salvaged, and were therefore burnt. Asheri also says the Greeks did not have the required numbers to staff the ships they could have captured from the Persian fleet; therefore, they preferred to burn the ships instead of letting the Persians take them back.

McDougall and Wallinga argue the Persians used wood from their ships to construct their field fortifications. Evans says this is not plausible, noting the statement by Herodotus, who says stones and tree trunks were used. Evans says the Persians were already quite exhausted, and stripping wood from their ships would have taken them too much time. Evans estimates there were 200 Persian ships, and says constructing a fortification to store all of them would be tough on the beach's terrain. Assuming the ships were stored in columns of 70 and rows of three, and each ship took up 5 meters (16 ft) of length, 40 meters (130 ft) of width and an additional 1 metre (3.3 ft) on both the top and bottom; the total length would be 500 meters (1,600 ft) and the total width would be 120 meters (390 ft). Evans says this is too large a fort to be accommodated on beaches in the Mediterranean, where the length from the land to the water is not more than 120 meters (390 ft) usually.

== Bibliography ==
=== Theses and research papers ===
- Belogiannis, Orestis (2021). "In the Aftermath of Salamis: The Revolt of Potidaea" (PDF). Živa Antika/Antiquité Vivante. 71 (1–2): 85–108. doi:10.47054/ZIVA21711-2085b. Archived (PDF) from the original on 20 June 2024.
- Evans, Richard (2024). "The Battle of Mycale (479 BC). A Fitting Climax to Herodotus' History or Just a Brawl on the Beach?" (PDF). Nuova Antologia Militare. 5 (18): 53–82. doi:10.36158/97888929588453. ISBN 9788892958845. ISSN 2704-9795. Archived from the original on 18 May 2024.
- Lateiner, Donald (2005). "Signifying Names and Other Ominous Accidental Utterances in Classical Historiography" (PDF). Greek, Roman and Byzantine Studies. 45 (1): 35–57. ISSN 0017-3916. S2CID 170499523. Archived from the original on 15 September 2024.
- Stoessl, Franz (1952). "Aeschylus as a Political Thinker". The American Journal of Philology. 73 (2): 113–139. doi:10.2307/291809. JSTOR 291809.
- Tronson, Adrian (1991). "The Hellenic League of 450 B.C. - Fact Or Ideological Fiction?" (PDF). Acta Classica. 34 (1): 93–110. hdl:10520/AJA00651141_386. ISSN 0065-1141.
- van Rookhuijzen, Jan Zacharias (2018). Where Xerxes' Throne Once Stood: Gazing with Herodotus at the Persian Invasion in the Landscapes of Greece and Anatolia (PDF) (PhD thesis). Radboud Universiteit Nijmegen. hdl:2066/182830. ISBN 9789462338586. Archived from the original (PDF) on 7 August 2024.

=== Books ===
- Asheri, David, ed. (2006). Erodoto: Le Storie Libro IX. La battaglia di Platea [Herodotus: Histories Book IX. The Battle of Plataea] (in Italian). Fondazione Lorenzo Valla and Arnoldo Mondadori Editore. ISBN 9788804549185.
- Badi, Amir Mehdi (1975). Les Grecs Et Les Barbares IV: Salamine et Platées [The Greeks and the Barbarians IV: Salamis and Plataea] (in French). Payot. ISBN 9782601098068.
- Balcer, Jack Martin (1995). Schuller, Wolfgang (ed.). The Persian Conquest of the Greeks 545 - 450 BC. XENIA. Konstanzer Althistorische Vortrage und Forschungen. Vol. 38. Universitatsverlag Konstanz. ISBN 9783879404896. ISSN 0936-8663.
- Buckley, Terry (2010). Aspects of Greek History 750-323 BC. A Source-Based Approach. Routledge. doi:10.4324/9780203860212. ISBN 9780203860212.
- Burn, Andrew Robert (1966). The Pelican History of Greece. Penguin Books. ISBN 9780140207927.
- Burn, Andrew Robert (1984). Persia and the Greeks. The Defence of the West, c. 546-478 B. C. (2nd ed.). Gerald Duckworth & Co. ISBN 9780715617113.
- Bury, John Bagnell (2015) [1900]. A History of Greece. To the Death of Alexander the Great (Digital ed.). Cambridge University Press. ISBN 9781108082204.
- Cawkwell, George (2005). The Greek Wars: The Failure of Persia. Oxford University Press. doi:10.1093/oso/9780198148715.001.0001. ISBN 9780198148715.
- Dandamaev, M. A. (1989). A Political History of the Achaemenid Empire. Translated by Vogelsang, Willem J. E. J. Brill. doi:10.1163/9789004667631. ISBN 9789004667631. S2CID 160052824.
- Fehling, Detlev (1971). Die Quellenangaben bei Herodot: Studien zur Erzählkunst Herodots [The Sources of Herodotus: Studies of Herodotus' Narrative Art]. Untersuchungen zur antiken Literatur und Geschichte [Studies in Ancient Literature and History] (in German). Vol. 9. De Gruyter. doi:10.1515/9783110841930. ISBN 9783110036343.
- Flower, Michael A.; Marincola, John (2002). Herodotus. Histories Book IX. Cambridge Greek and Latin Classics. Cambridge University Press. ISBN 9780521596503.
- Green, Peter (1996). The Greco-Persian Wars. University of California Press. doi:10.1525/9780520917064. ISBN 9780520203136.
- Hignett, Charles (1963). Xerxes' Invasion of Greece. Clarendon Press. ISBN 9780198142478.
- Immerwahr, Henry R. (1966). Form and Thought in Herodotus. Philological Monographs. Vol. 23. American Philological Association. ISBN 9780891304784.
- Lazenby, John Francis (1993). The Defence of Greece, 490-479 B.C. Aris & Phillips. ISBN 9780856685910.
- Mikalson, Jon D. (2003). Herodotus and Religion in the Persian Wars. University of North Carolina Press. ISBN 9780807827987.
- Nudell, Joshua P. (2023). Accustomed to Obedience? Classical Ionia and the Aegean World, 480–294 BCE. University of Michigan Press. doi:10.3998/mpub.12067181. ISBN 9780472903870. Project MUSE 110002.
- Phang, Sara Elise; Spence, Iain; Kelly, Douglas; Londey, Peter, eds. (2016). Conflict in Ancient Greece and Rome: The Definitive Political, Social, and Military Encyclopedia [3 Volumes]. ABC-CLIO. ISBN 9781610690201.
- Rahe, Paul (2015). The Grand Strategy of Classical Sparta: The Persian Challenge. Yale Library of Military History. Yale University Press. doi:10.12987/9780300218602. ISBN 978-0-300-11642-7. JSTOR j.ctvmd857x.
- Shepherd, William (2012). Plataea 479 BC: The Most Glorious Victory Ever Seen. Osprey Campaign Series. Vol. 239. Osprey Publishing. ISBN 9781849085540.
- Wallinga, H. T. (2005). Xerxes' Greek Adventure: The Naval Perspective. Mnemosyne Supplements. Vol. 264. Brill. doi:10.1163/9789047406549. ISBN 9789004141407. ISSN 0169-8958.
- Yates, David C. (2019). States of Memory: The Polis, Panhellenism, and the Persian War. Oxford University Press. doi:10.1093/oso/9780190673543.001.0001. ISBN 9780190673543.

=== Book chapters ===
- Barron, J. P. (1988). "The Liberation of Greece". In Boardman, John; Hammond, N. G. L.; Lewis, David Malcolm; Ostwald, Martin (eds.). The Cambridge Ancient History. Vol. 4: Persia, Greece and the Western Mediterranean, c. 525 to 479 BC (2nd ed.). Cambridge University Press. pp. 592–622. doi:10.1017/CHOL9780521228046. ISBN 9781139054317.
- Blanshard, Alastair (2007). "Trapped between Athens and Chios: A Relationship in Fragments". In Katsaros, Andrea; Jennings, Victoria (eds.). The World of Ion of Chios. Mnemosyne. Vol. 288. Brill. pp. 155–177. doi:10.1163/ej.9789004160453.i-451.41. ISBN 9789047421184.
- Lupi, Marcello (2017). "Sparta and the Persian Wars, 499–478". In Powell, Anton (ed.). A Companion to Sparta. John Wiley & Sons. pp. 269–290. doi:10.1002/9781119072379.ch10. ISBN 9781405188692.
- McDougall, Iain (1990). "The Persian Ships at Mycale". In Craik, Elizabeth M. (ed.). "Owls to Athens": Essays on Classical Subjects Presented to Sir Kenneth Dover. Oxford University Press. pp. 143–150. doi:10.1093/oso/9780198144786.003.0017. ISBN 9781383004731. S2CID 190575886.
