= Xenagoras =

Xenagoras (Ancient Greek: Ξεναγόρας) was the name of a number of men of classical antiquity:

- Xenagoras of Halicarnassus (5th century BC), companion of the Achaemenid commander Masistes
- Xenagoras (historian), a historical writer, likely of the 2nd century BCE
- Xenagoras, historian, and father of the historian Nymphis; possibly the same man as the historian Xenagoras
- Xenagoras (geometer), who wrote in the ancient world about the heights of mountains
