= Azanes (general) =

5th century Persian army general

Azanes (fl. 480 BC) was a Sogdian general. He led a contingent of troops in the Achaemenid army of Xerxes I during the Second Persian invasion of Greece in 480 BC.

Azanes was a Sogdian, a member of an Iranian group of people that inhabited Sogdia, and the son of Artaios (Artaeus). All that is known about him comes from Herodotus who reports that Azanes went to war with Xerxes I against the Greeks in 480 B.C., thus participating in the Persian invasion of Greece, which was started as a response to the defeat of the First Persian invasion of Greece at the Battle of Marathon, and resulted in Greek victory.

The Persians were blocked at the Thermopylae by King Leonidas, and also at the Battle of Artemisium. The latter battle, however, culminated in a Persian strategical victory, and after their eventual victory at Thermopylae, all of Euboea, Phocis, Boeotia and Attica fell to the Persian army, which captured and burnt Athens. The Greeks managed to protect the Peloponnesus, and lured the Persians in the Straits of Salamis, where their ships disorganized and were defeated. Xerxes I fled back to Asia and Mardonius was left to complete the conquest. He was defeated and killed at the Battle of Plataea which, coupled with the Greek naval victory at Mycale, determined the Persian defeat. The fate of Azanes is unknown.

Azanes commanded the Sogdians, while Artabazos and Artyphios commanded, respectively, the Parthians and Chorasmians and the Gandarians and Dadicans. They are said to have all served with the same equipment of the Bactrians.
