= Artaÿntes =

Ancient Persian general of the 5th century BCE

Artaÿntes (Ancient Greek: Ἀρταΰντης), son of Artachaees, was one of the generals in the army of Xerxes I. When Xerxes had returned to Asia after the Battle of Salamis, Artaÿntes, Ithamitres, and some other generals, sailed to Samos in order to watch the Ionians, and in the hope that the land-force under Mardonius in northern Greece might still be successful.

But after the Battle of Plataea and Battle of Mycale in 479 BCE, Artaÿntes and Ithamitres took to flight. While Artaÿntes was passing through Asia, he was met by the prince Masistes, brother of Xerxes, who censured him severely for his cowardly flight. Artaÿntes, enraged, drew his sword and would have killed Masistes, had he not been saved by Xeinagoras, a Greek, who seized Artaÿntes at the moment and threw him on the ground, for which act he was liberally rewarded.
