= Parsondes =

Cadusian king

Parsondes was the king of the Cadusii, who, according to Ctesias, was of Persian origin.

== Name ==
The name Parsondes probably comes from the important city of Parsindu, which was located among the mountains of Namri, on the road to Ecbatana. According to another version, Parsondes is the doric form of the name Perseus.

== History ==
The Medes were ruled by Artaeus, who was the successor to the Assyrian king Sardanapalus, in Media there was a certain Parsondes, a man who was famous for his courage and strength, was smart and outwardly handsome, what the king liked among the people of the Persians from whom he descending.He loved wild animals, caught them in hand-to-hand combat, and in a chariot or horse battle. Artaeus fought with the cadus and his friend and loyal adviser, a persian named Parsondes, comes to the cadusii, who made him their supreme commander. He defeated Arteus, devastated Media and became the king of the Cadusii. At the end of his days Parsondes made a great oath that no successor should make peace with the Medes; and thus the enmity continued, the cadusii did not obey any king, until Cyrus transferred the empire from the Medes to the Persians.

== Hypotheses ==
Ernst Herzfeld believed that the name of Parsondes is etymologically identical to the name of Afrasiab (Avestan: Fraŋrasyan). According to François Lenormant, Parsondes is one of the names of Ninus, or Hercules, whom he identifies with the sun.
