= Ernst Kromayer =

German dermatologist

Ernst Kromayer (26 September 1862 in Stralsund – 6 May 1933 in Berlin) was a German dermatologist. He was the younger brother of historian Johannes Kromayer (1859–1934).

He studied medicine at the universities of Strasbourg, Würzburg, and Bonn, receiving his doctorate in 1885. From 1888 he worked as an assistant to Karl Koester at the pathology clinic in Bonn, and in 1890 qualified as a lecturer at the University of Halle. At Halle he established a clinic for skin and venereal diseases that eventually acquired the status of a university clinic. In 1901 he received the title of professor at the university, then in 1904 relocated to Berlin, where he opened a private practice.

He is best remembered for inventing a water-cooled mercury-vapor lamp (Kromayer lamp) for ultraviolet irradiation of the skin. On 23 October 1906 he received a patent for the lamp. He also made pioneer contributions in regards to dermabrasion; around 1905 he introduced a device that consisted of rotating burrs attached to a dental drill, being designed for the removal of unwanted skin layers.

In 1962 Grünstraße ("Green Street") in Halle an der Saale was renamed Ernst-Kromayer-Straße in his honor.

== Published works ==
His book Die Behandlung der kosmetischen Hautleiden (1923), was later translated into English and published as The cosmetic treatment of skin complaints, with especial reference to physical therapy and scarless methods of operation (1930). Other works by Kromayer are:

- Allgemeine Dermatologie; oder, Allgemeine Pathologie, Diagnose und Therapie der Hautkrankheiten, in zweiundzwanzig Vorlesungen, 1896 – General dermatology; or, general pathology, diagnosis and treatment of skin diseases, in twenty-two lectures.
- Zur Austilgung der Syphilis; abolitionistische Betrachtungen über Prostitution, Geschlechtskrankheiten und Volksgesundheit nebst Vorschlägen zu einem Syphilisgesetz, 1898 – Towards the eradication of syphilis; abolitionist reflections on prostitution, venereal diseases and public health, including proposals for a syphilis law.
- Repetitorium der haut- und geschlechtskrankheiten für studierende und aerzte, 1902 – Refresher course on skin and venereal diseases for students and doctors.
- Röntgen-radium-licht in der dermatologie, 1913 – Röntgen-radium-light in dermatology.
