= Xerxes's pontoon bridges =

Pontoon spans over the ancient Dardanelles

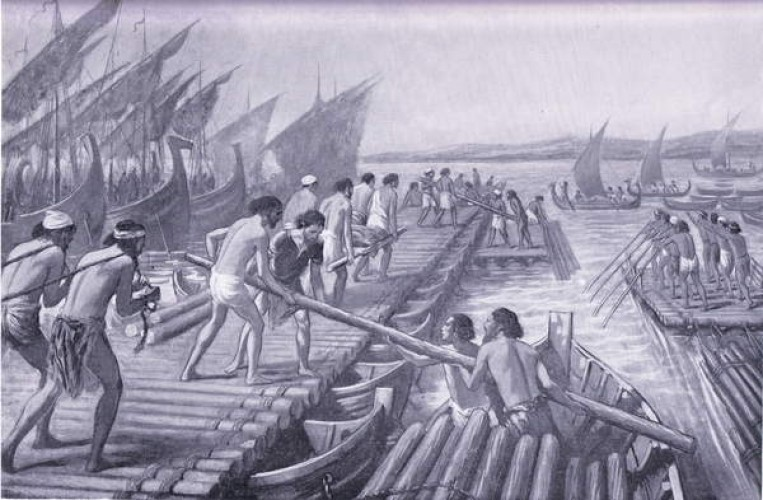
Construction of Xerxes Bridge of boats by Phoenician sailors

Hellespont

Xerxes's pontoon bridges were constructed in 480 BC during the second Persian invasion of Greece (part of the Greco-Persian Wars) upon the order of Xerxes I of Persia for the purpose of Xerxes's army to traverse the Hellespont (the present-day Dardanelles) from Asia into Thrace, then also controlled by Persia (in the European part of modern Turkey).

The bridges were described by the ancient Greek historian Herodotus in his Histories, but little other evidence confirms Herodotus's story in this respect. Most modern historians accept the building of the bridges as such, but practically all details related by Herodotus are subject to doubt and discussion.

== The bridges in Herodotus's Histories ==
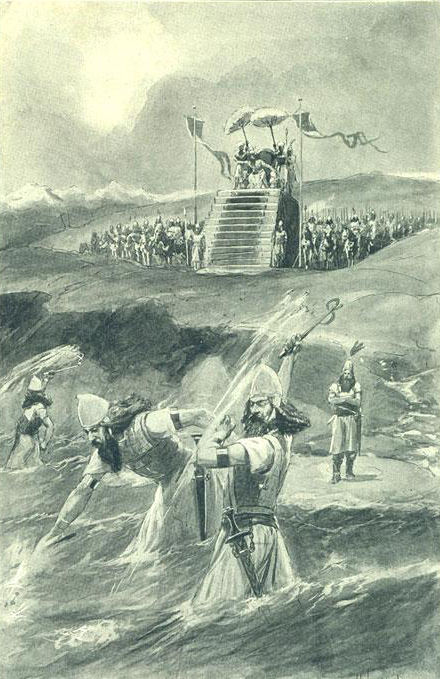
An artist's illustration depicting Xerxes's alleged "punishment" of the Hellespont

Herodotus relates in his Histories that the Second Persian invasion of Greece already intended by Darius I was carefully prepared by his son Xerxes I. A canal crossing the Athos peninsula was constructed. Among many other things he also ordered ships of war to be furnished and ropes of papyrus and of white flax to be prepared for the bridges.

During the time Xerxes and his huge army were marching from Sardes to Abydos, then an important harbor on the Hellespont, two bridges were built from there to the opposite side near Sestos over a distance of seven stadia (some 1,300 m or 1,400 yd), but were destroyed by a storm before the army arrived. Xerxes was enraged and had those responsible for building the bridges beheaded. He is then said to have thrown fetters into the strait, given it three hundred whiplashes, and branded it with red-hot irons as the soldiers shouted at the water.

New bridges were constructed by lashing penteconters and triremes together. 360 ships were used to construct the northeasterly bridge and 314 ships were used for the southwesterly bridge. Anchors were lowered at either end of the boats to keep them in place and cables, alternatively made of white flax and papyrus, were stretched from shore to shore to hold the boats together and were tightened by large winches. The weight of the cables of flax is said to have been one talent per cubit. Three openings were provided for the passage of small boats. Wooden planks were laid across the cables, and brushwood and soil used to cover the planks and form a dirt roadway. Screens were put up on either side of the bridges to prevent the horses and other animals from panicking at the sight of the sea below.

The crossing of the Hellespont took seven days and nights, the army using the northeasterly bridge and the huge crowd of attendants and baggage animals the southwesterly bridge.

After the crossing, the bridges were left behind. When a part of the Persian army later retreated to the Hellespont, they only found the debris of the bridges destroyed by another storm.

== Details ==
After Herodotus hardly indicated the location of the pontoon bridge across the Bosphorus built some 30 years earlier by Xerxes's father Darius I, but did not provide any specific information about that bridge, the wealth of details given for the bridges across the Hellespont is astonishing and, upon cursory reading, seems to provide a clear picture. However, upon closer examination, almost every detail of the bridges is the subject of discussions, doubts and questions. Herodotus's narrative should, perhaps, not be taken as a bridge engineer's sober technical report but rather as a vivid illustration of the grandeur of the Persian king which would make the Greek victories appear even more outstanding.

Details in the play The Persians by Aeschylus (an Athenian playwright) written in 472 BC, less than a decade after the bridge is said to have been built, tend to corroborate the idea of it. In that play, Atossa, the mother of Xerxes, learns of what a disaster her son's invasion of Greece has been. The play is Hellenocentric.

She goes to the grave of Darius, her late husband and the father of Xerxes. The spirit of Darius rises and she tells him of their son's misadventure, and what preceded it. ATOSSA: From shore to shore he bridged the Hellespont.

GHOST OF DARIUS: What! could he chain the mighty Bosphorus?

ATOSSA: Ev'n so, some god assisting his design.

The Ghost of Darius goes on to lament:

With what a winged course the oracles

Haste their completion! With the lightning's speed

Jove on my son hath hurled his threaten'd vengeance:

Yet I implored the gods that it might fall

In time's late process: but when rashness drives

Impetuous on, the scourge of Heaven upraised

Lashes the Fury forward; hence these ills

Pour headlong on my friends. Not weighing this,

My son, with all the fiery pride of youth,

Hath quickened their arrival, while he hoped

To bind the sacred Hellespont, to hold

The raging Bosphorus, like a slave, in chains,

And dared the advent'rous passage, bridging firm

With links of solid iron his wondrous way,

To lead his numerous host; and swell'd with thoughts

Presumptuous, deem'd, vain mortal! that his power

Should rise above the gods, and Neptune's might.

And was riot this the phrensy of the soul?

But much I fear lest all my treasured wealth

Fall to some daring hand an easy prey.

Aeschylus was an Athenian playwright who had fought in the battle of Salamis, and witnessed there the destruction of the Persian fleet.

=== Dardanelles ===
The surface current to the Mediterranean flows at an average speed of 1 1/2 knots but varies according to wind directions which may also cause the water level to rise by some 60 cm (2.0 ft). There is an undercurrent in the opposite direction. Bills and points may cause eddies and shoals.

At present, the narrowest part of the Dardanelles between Çanakkale and Kilitbahir (40°8′38.32″N 26°23′23.45″E) is about 1.4 km (1,530 yards) wide and has a maximum depth of 91 m (299 ft). It has the strongest current and in shipping it is considered the most difficult part of the Dardanelles. Çanakkale was built during the early Ottoman Empire on the alluvial gravel fan deposited by a river, in winter often a torrent, descending from the nearby mountains (and recently tamed by the Atikhisar dam). 2500 years ago, this alluvial fan may not have protruded into the strait as it does today.

Abydos, the town mentioned by Herodotus, was north of Çanakkale on the Asiatic shore near Nara Burnu (formerly Nagara) (40°11′47″N 26°24′52″E). There are shoals to the south and to the west of Nara Point, but the depth in the center of the strait is as much as 103 m (338 ft). The current is running at more than 2 kn, but there are large eddies around Nara Point.

=== Location of the two bridges ===
The location of the bridges between Abydos and near Sestos on the opposite shore, as indicated by Herodotus, is accepted by many historians. The British Major-General Frederick Barton Maurice, on a visit to the area in 1922, considered a beach further north to be the only acceptable location for a bridge from a military point of view; but there, the distance across is more than 3 km (3,280 yards).

The presently narrowest part at Çanakkale appears to be beyond all question. Most probably, it was not as narrow then, and there was a constant danger of the untamed river becoming torrential at very short notice and washing away whatever was in its reach.

Two bridges were necessary because the narrow roads in the Chersonese required that, to avoid leaving the head of the very long column of troops without food and water, the column of troops and the supply column march in parallel.

=== Ships ===
Herodotus is clear in telling us that only pentecontes and triremes, i.e. only naval vessels, were used for the bridges. Apparently, this is accepted by all historians. However, it does not make sense to use expensive naval ships (unless such ships were available in abundance since most of them were contributed by the Greek coastal city-states in Asia Minor, by Phoenicia, by Syria, and by Egypt, all of which were under Persian rule, at the time) were for a task which would be better fulfilled by simple and cheaper merchant vessels with a larger beam, deeper center of gravity and higher freeboard; on the other hand, slender ships would also make sense since they provided the least resistance to the surface current in the Hellespont (Dardanelles). The lowest oar ports of a trireme were about 30 cm above the waterline and were normally fitted with leather sleeves, an aspect which does not really qualify them as a bridge carrier.

Ships carrying a bridge should all have the same height in order to provide a flat bridge deck and thus, one may assume that the bridge consisted only of penteconters (if not of commercial ships) and that the larger and higher triremes were only used on either side of the passageways.

=== Anchors ===
Pontoon bridges across rivers are usually held in position by anchors fastened to the bow and stern of each boat and thus, at a first glance, Herodotus's description appears to be correct. However, the depth of the strait is not mentioned at all in his Histories. Modern historians do mention the depth, but do not discuss it anywhere as a problem for anchoring.

The length of anchor ropes must be several times the depth of water in order to prevent damage to the ship caused by a jerking anchor rope and to prevent the anchor from dragging along the seabed. Ships in the center of the strait would thus have had to use anchor ropes with a length of several hundred meters each. The total of 674 ships would not only have required 1348 heavy anchors, but also some 300 km of anchor ropes. One may question whether at that time it would have been possible to manufacture such huge amounts within a relatively short time. Even if iron anchors existed already then, it is unlikely that the iron manufacturing was capable to produce some 183 tonnes of iron anchors. In addition, the anchorage is not safe: the long ropes cannot prevent the ships from swinging and colliding, in particular when eddies add to the confusion and long ropes get entangled. Last, but not least, it seems to be impossible to find the right points for dropping the anchors so that their long lines would hold the ships properly lined up across the strait.

If one adheres to the ships being anchored as described by Herodotus, one has to take into account that each bridge together with the space required for the anchor ropes would have occupied a strip up to 900 m wide. However, the shore at Abydos would not have been wide enough to accommodate two such bridges.

There is a further technical point: The addition of anchors and of cables reaching from shore to shore provides added holding power to the ships only in theory, i.e. if the ships' tension on the anchor ropes and on the cables is exactly equal, but in practice, it is not possible to tune them to such a degree, especially not under the influence of changing winds, currents, eddies and undercurrents. But then, the whole load has to be borne by either the ropes or the cables, without the other (slack) one contributing anything to the horizontal load bearing capacity of the installation.

Therefore, there appears no alternative but to assume that the ships were held in place by the long cables only, and that anchors were used only temporarily to hold ships in shoal waters until they were attached to the cables.

=== Length of the bridges ===
The length of seven stadia or some 1,300 m as indicated by Herodotus is too short in any event.

At Abydos, the distance between the shores is some 2,000 m. Yet, the bridges would have been longer. If they could not be kept in position by anchors because of the depth of the strait, they must have been held by cables reaching from shore to shore (no matter whether by a single long cable or by a series of cables). Because of the current and the lateral wind forces, they would have described a large curve allowing for a sort of horizontal sag of the cables in order to prevent the tension to increase indefinitely. Similar to the curves of the main cables in modern suspension bridges, the cables would have been some 5 to 10% longer than the distance between the shores—plus some lengths for fastening them on shore and on the ships. This results in the length of these cables exceeding 2,200 m (2,400 yd).

If the beam of a penteconter is taken to be 4 m (13 ft), the bridge consisting of 314 ships spread across 2,200 m would show gaps of some 3 m (9.8 ft), if the openings made by triremes are disregarded. A gap of 3 m seems to be reasonable. The other bridge consisting of 360 ships in a similar configuration would then have a length of near to 2,520 m (2,760 yd), which appears reasonable for a bridge situated some distance to the northeast of Nagara Point.

=== Width of the bridges respective to the roads ===
Herodotus does not give any indication of the width of the bridges or of the roads passing over them. One assumes the width of Greek roads to have measured between 2.7 and 3.6 m (8.9 and 11.8 ft) Thus, the width of the bridge can be taken as 3.6 m, allowing four soldiers abreast or two horsemen side by side. A larger bridge would not have any positive effect since the road at the end of the bridge could not take up all the arriving masses. Furthermore, large pontoon bridges appear to roll more distinctly than narrow ones and the horses, nervous from the outset, get even more frightened.

=== Cables ===
The orders made in the preparatory phase to produce cables for the bridges are mentioned by Herodotus in a rather casual way like orders for larger quantities of standard merchandise. Only when he describes the bridges rebuilt after the storm he gives a single indication saying that the weight of the cables made of white flax was one talent per cubit what roughly translates into 26 kg/46 cm or 56.5 kg per meter. Using various methods of conversion one arrives at diameters between 23 and 28 cm (between 9 and 11 inches)! Cables weighing that much cannot be handled, it is almost impossible to bend cables with such a diameter or to reel them on a cable drum—which probably did not yet exist at that time—or to put them into any other transportable condition. Bollards of several meters in diameter would have been necessary in order to fasten these cables without breaking them. Herodotus appears to talk about undivided cables reaching from shore to shore. However, a single cable of 2,200 m would have weighed 124.3 tonnes and even today could not be transported by any practical means.

Since such cables or ropes cannot be handled and, therefore, have no practical field of application, it cannot be assumed that any ropemaker in antiquity has ever produced such a cable. That alone is sufficient to discard the occasional opinion that the ropes had been produced and delivered in manageable lengths and had been spliced together on the spot.

The idea of the cables having been produced on the ships already lined up for the bridge does not appear to be feasible, either. If such ropes never had been produced, it is more than unlikely that the Persian general staff would have relied on a totally unknown method of production to be executed on swaying ships to build bridges of vital importance for the whole campaign, in particular since everybody involved was aware that any failure could result in his being beheaded. Besides, ropemaking requires a certain tension of the strands and of the rope. For this reason, it has been assumed that initially, during the period of rope production, the ships would have been moored next to each other in order to withstand the tension of the ropemaking taking place across them One may imagine this procedure being executed across three or four ships, but with any larger number of ships in open water, severe damage to the ships and serious disruptions of the ropemaking must be anticipated.

It seems impossible to tighten cables of such enormous lengths by windlasses as described by Herodotus.

Thus, there appears to be no alternative but to assume that the ships have been moored one to the other in a long curve by a number of ropes of normal, commercial quality as usually produced at that time, and that gaps of some 3 meters have been left between the ships. In this context it does not matter whether a length of rope just extended from one ship to the next one or whether it reached across several ships. It also does not matter whether it was sufficient to do the mooring by using just one rope at the bow and at the stern. If a number of ropes were necessary they would have been placed close to each other paying attention to tensions on these ropes being equal. In order to avoid entangling, these ropes (like the parallel wires in the main cables of modern suspension bridges) might have been wrapped by some sort of sheets or ropes. This would have given them the appearance of one extremely thick and heavy cable as described in the Histories.

According to Herodotus, the ropes were not only used as mooring ropes but also supported the wooden logs forming the bridge deck which is a rather unusual method of construction. Sailors carefully prevent ropes from chafing or from being pressed by hard objects and thus try to avoid early deterioration of the ropes. The constant movement of the ships caused by waves and by the marching troops and the heavy loads of the soldiers and of the earth covering the logs putting pressure on the stretched ropes would have led to an early failure of the ropes. In addition, this setup would not have allowed to have a flat and even bridge deck. The ropes in between the ships would have sagged under the load of the earth and of the people which would have caused a constant up and down of the road. On top, the earth would have accumulated in the center of the sags and thus increased the local load on the ropes. There was no necessity for this configuration: the space between the ships being only three meters, the gap could easily have been bridged by the logs put from one ship to the next and parallel to the ropes. This would have been a better basis for the road and would not have had any bad influence on the ropes.

=== Bridge deck ===
==== Wooden logs ====
The bridge deck was made of wooden logs which must have had a thickness of at least 10 cm (3.9 in). Since sawmills did not yet exist, the logs must have been split and roughly dressed tree trunks. One bridge would have used up 800 solid cubic meters, the other one some 910 solid cubic meters, which adds up to a total of 1,710 solid cubic meters of wood. At an average specific weight of 0.5 t/m^{3}, this corresponds to a total weight of 855 tonnes.

==== Brushwood ====
The purpose of the brushwood covering the logs remains unclear. Perhaps it was meant to keep the earth on the bridge.

==== Earth pavement ====
In recent modern times, a mere wooden bridge deck on a pontoon bridge was considered perfectly satisfactory. In certain densely forested parts of the US and of Canada, however, wooden roads have been covered by a layer of earth to protect the wood from deteriorating, which appears to have provided some comfort for the horses and carriages. The stamped earth must have had a thickness of at least 20 cm, otherwise it would have been broken up immediately under the horses' hooves.

==== Load assumptions ====
A bridge deck of 3.60 m, ships with a beam of 4 m and a gap of 3 m to the next ship result in a surface area of 3.6 × 7 = 25.2 m^{2} to be borne by each ship. The weight of a square meter is made up of 50 kg of logs and 360 kg of earth adding up to 410 kg As a result, each ship had to carry 25.2 m^{2} x 410 kg/m^{2} = 10,332 kg plus the weight of 4 × 7 = 28 persons with luggage adding up to 2,520 kg, thus a total weight of some 13 tonnes, which appears to be a reasonable load for the ships of that time.

==== Screens ====
The screens which Herodotus tells us to have been set up on either side of the bridge to block the horses' view on the water are imagined to have been 2.74 m (9.0 ft) tall, constructed out of tree limbs and with smaller limbs and other plants woven through these poles in order to make a solid wall. Only one such screen on the bridge of 2,200 m would thus have had an area of some 6,000 m^{2}. Even during a very gentle breeze, the wind loads on this huge area could not have been controlled by the means available at that time. Pontoon bridges of the last centuries have shown that it is entirely sufficient to have simple guardrails made of wooden lattices or ropes in order to keep the horses on the bridge.

==== Openings for ships ====
The three openings for the passage of small ships probably have been made by inserting higher triremes into the line of penteconters or commercial vessels. Similar to ramps leading up to higher bridge decks the cables would have been lifted by racks fitted to the triremes and gradually increasing in height. As the ships could easily unstep their masts, a clearance of about 2 meters above the water level should have been sufficient for merchant ships to pass underneath. When winds caused the load on the cables to increase the triremes would have been pushed deeper into the water but this was only temporary as long as the wind lasted.

== Storm damage ==
Although Herodotus appears to be clear in saying that the initial bridges were destroyed by a storm, very little information can be derived from this phrase. It is left to speculation whether and to what extent ships, cables, ropes and logs were recovered, saved, repaired and reused. On the other hand, there is no indication of a total loss and that all elements of the bridges had to be procured again. The preparation of the bridges lasted months, if not years. Therefore, replacement deliveries of ships, cables, ropes and logs would have taken at least some months. The initial placement of the wooden logs and the earth cover must initially have taken several days. Even if one assumes that no replacement deliveries were necessary and that all items could have been repaired, those repairs must have taken several days. During this time, the army waiting at the shore would have got into a very serious situation, since the provisions of food, fodder and water had not been calculated to cope with a prolonged stay.

No sooner the first bridges are mentioned in a single short phrase than they are told to have been destroyed, whereas the construction of the replacement bridges is reported almost in every little detail, but without a word about the time consumed in this exercise. This may lead to the assumption that the bridges told to have been destroyed by a storm were used by Herodotus only as a pretext for his vivid description in all details of an outburst of rage of the great king Xerxes and even to quote his furious speech in full.

== See also ==
- Xerxes Canal
