= Artaeus =

Ancient Greek king

Artaeus ( Ancient Greek: Ἀρταῖος. Old Persian: R̥taya), is the legendary sixth king of Media mentioned by Ctesias, who succeeded Arbian, and not Sardanapalus. Artaeus was the father of Artachaees and Azanes.

== History ==
During his reign, there is a dispute between him and a certain Parsondes, who asks Artaeus for the post of satrap of Babylonia, the satrap of which at that time was Nanarus, whom Parsondes did not like just because of his appearance. After several attempts to take away power from Nanarus with the help of Artaeus, he eventually takes offense at the decision of the king and runs to the Cadusian tribe with three thousand foot soldiers and a thousand horsemen, where he married the sister of one of the most influential people in those parts. After leading the Cadusian tribe, Parsondes defeats Artaeus and devastates Media. At the end of his days "Parsondes" makes a great oath that no successor will make peace with the Medes; and thus the enmity continued.
