= Athenagoras of Samos =

Ancient Greek ambassador

Athenagoras (Ancient Greek: Ἀθηναγόρας, fl. 479 BCE), son of Archestratides, was an ancient Greek man from Samos who was a partisan on the Greek side during the Greco-Persian Wars. He was one of the ambassadors sent by the Samians to Leotychidas II shortly before the Battle of Mycale in 479 BCE.
