= Archestratides =

Archestratides (Ancient Greek: Ἀρχεστρατίδης) was an unusual name of ancient Greece that appears in only a few places in all of the ancient writing we have today, and may refer to one of several people:

- Archestratides (fl. 6th century BCE), archon of Athens from 577 to 576 BCE.
- Archestratides of Samos (fl. 5th century BCE), father of Athenagoras of Samos.
- Archestratides (fl. 5th century BCE), Athenian orator who prosecuted Alcibiades, apparently to satisfy a grudge between his house and that of Alcibiades.
- Archestratides (fl. 4th century BCE), subject of a (lost) speech Against Archestratides by Hypereides. May be the same person as the prosecutor of Alcibiades, above.
