= Artachaees =

5th-century BC Persian engineer

Artachaees (Ancient Greek: Ἀρταχαίης), son of Artaeus, was an Achaemenid engineer of ancient Persia, who lived around the 5th century BCE.

He was reputed to be the tallest man in his country. He was described as being "four fingers short of five royal cubits". It is not possible to know with any precision what modern length was meant here, but most scholars agree it was somewhere between seven and eight feet tall.

Aside from his height, Artachaees was most noted for his architecting of the Xerxes Canal across the peninsula at the base of Mount Athos, and his direct role in overseeing its construction.

He died while Xerxes I was with his army at Athos; and Xerxes, who was deeply grieved at his loss, gave him a lavish funeral, and commanded his army to raise a mound for Artachaees. This mound was said to have been visible as late as the 19th century.

In the time of the historian Herodotus, the Acanthians, in pursuance of an oracle, sacrificed to Artachaees as a hero.

Herodotus also mentions a couple of commanders who were the sons of Artachaees. These were Artaÿntes, who commanded a segment of the Persian navy, and Otaspes, who commanded a group of Assyrian soldiers in the army.
