= Adolf Struck =

German writer (1877–1911)

Adolf Hermann Struck (1877–1911) was a German sightseer and writer. He is known for his travelogue Makedonische Fahrten and for surveying the Xerxes Canal in Northern Greece on his own in 1901.

== Works ==
- Makedonische Fahrten, Vienna and Leipzig, (1907).
- Der Xerxeskanal am Athos. Neue Jahrbücher for das klassiche Altertum: Geschichte und Literatur, 10 (1907).
- Mistra. Eine mittelalterliche Ruinenstadt. Streifblicke zur Geschichte und zu den Denkmälern des fränkisch-byzantinischen Zeitalters in Morea. Vienna, A. Hartleben, (1910).
- Zur landeskunde von Griechenland. Kulturgeschichtliches und wirtschaftliches. Frankfurt am Main., H. Keller, (1912).
