= Xerxes Canal =

Ancient canal through the base of the Mount Athos peninsula

Xerxes Canal

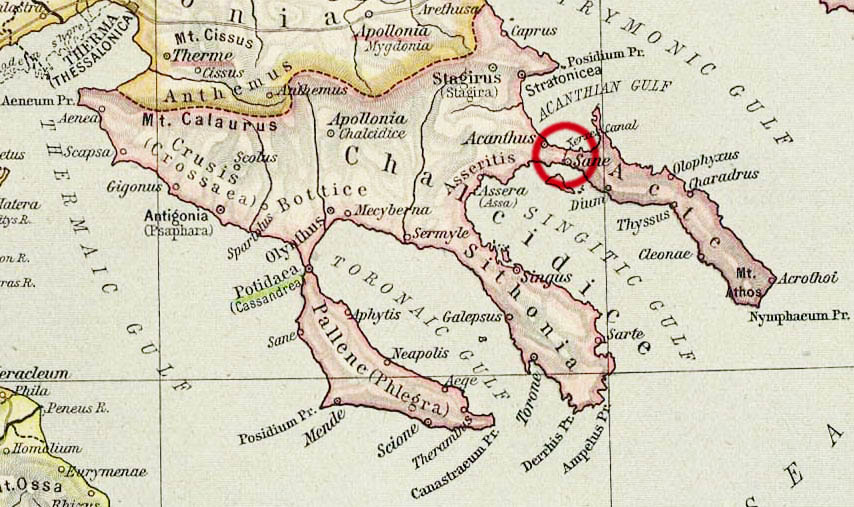
Map of the base of the Athos peninsula, with the course of the canal marked.

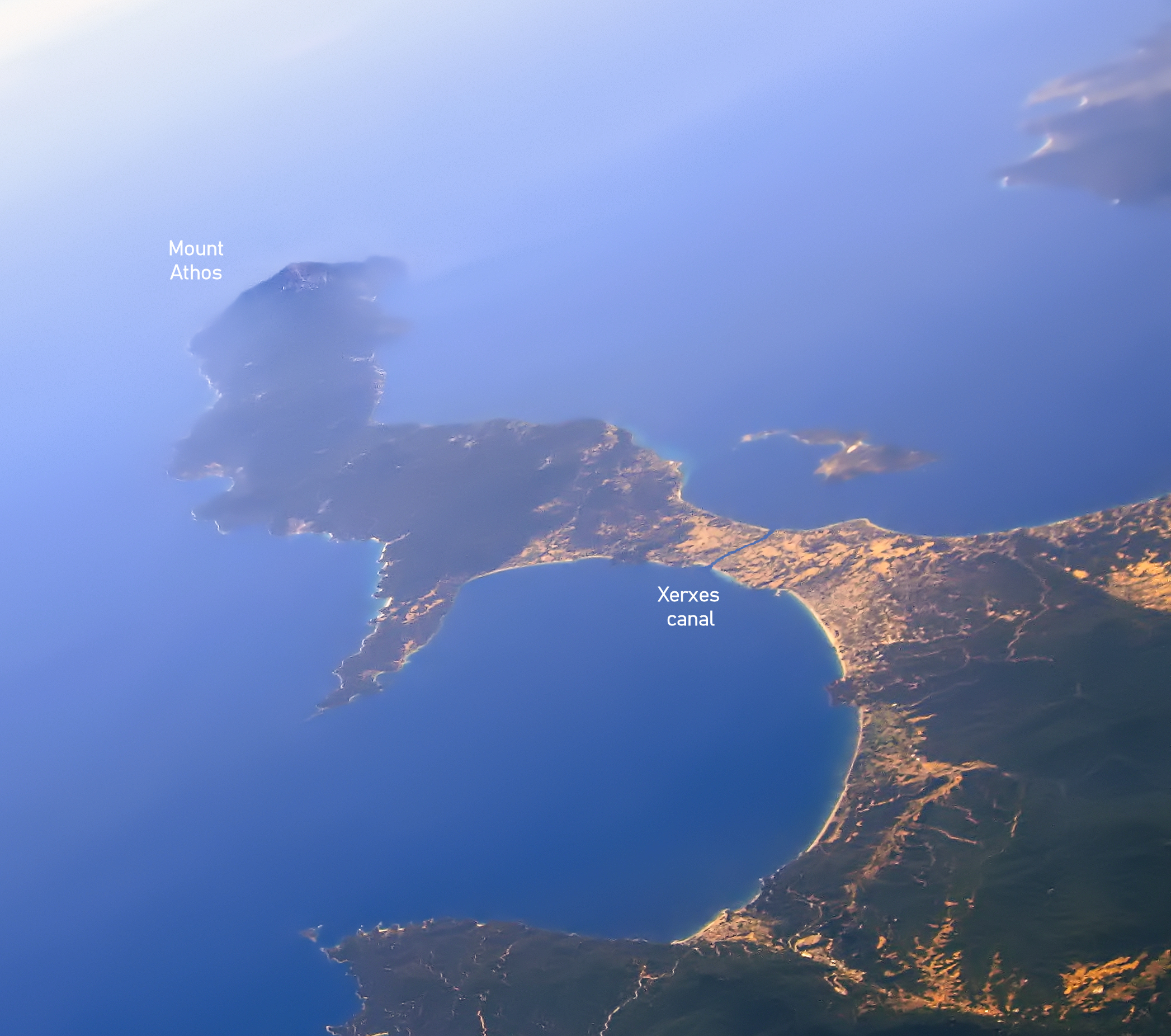
Mount Athos peninsula from the stratosphere (at an altitude of 23 km), and simulation of the Xerxes Canal (seen from north).

The Xerxes Canal (Greek: Διώρυγα του Ξέρξη) was a navigable canal through the base of the Mount Athos peninsula in Chalkidiki, northern Greece, built in the 5th century BC. King Xerxes I of Persia ordered its construction, which was overseen by his engineer Artachaees, as part of Xerxes' preparations for his second invasion of Greece in the Greco-Persian Wars. It is one of the few monuments left by the Persian Empire in Europe.

== Location ==
The canal is located near the village of Nea Roda in the Athos peninsula. Starting to the east of Nea Roda on the north coast it follows a fairly straight southwesterly direction towards the south coast, ending west of the village Tripiti. The canal is now completely covered by sediments, but its outline is visible from air photos, and has been detected by several surveys. The total length of the canal was 2 kilometres (1.2 mi), its width was 30 metres (100 ft), and it was 3 metres (10 ft) deep, enough for a trireme to pass. One end is at 40°22′52.8″N 23°55′43.2″E , the other at 40°21′54.2″N 23°54′53.9″E .

== History ==
Map of troop movements during the first and second Persian invasion of Greece. The Xerxes Canal is shown in the middle of the map on the purple line.

According to the Histories of the ancient Greek historian Herodotus, which recounts the events of the Greco-Persian Wars, the Persian commander Mardonios, in 492 BC, lost a great part of his fleet, 300 ships and 20,000 men, in a storm going around the cliffs of the Athos peninsula, during the First Persian invasion of Greece.

Xerxes, in preparation for the Second Persian invasion of Greece, in 483 BC ordered a channel built through the Athos isthmus in order to avoid falling prey to the same catastrophe. Herodotus speculates that pride also was a motivating factor:

As far as I can judge by conjecture, Xerxes gave the command for this digging out of pride, wishing to display his power and leave a memorial; with no trouble they could have drawn their ships across the isthmus, yet he ordered them to dig a canal from sea to sea, wide enough to float two triremes rowed abreast.

The work, led by the two Persians Bubares and Artachaees, lasted three years. It was completed in 480 BC by forcibly recruited locals, as well as Egyptian and Phoenician workers. The length, according to Herodotus, was 12 stadia (about 1,900 metres or 6,200 feet), and it was capped at both ends by dikes to prevent surf from clogging it. The canal soon fell into disrepair as it was not used after the Persian fleet had passed through on their way first to the battle of Artemisium and then on to that of Salamis.

The canal still formed part of the landscape 80 years later as it is mentioned in passing by Thucidydes in The History of the Peloponnesian War from around 400 BC:

After the taking of Amphipolis, Brasidas and his allies marched to the so-called Actè, or coastland, which runs out from the canal made by the Persian King and extends into the peninsula; it ends in Athos, a high mountain projecting into the Aegean sea.

== Archaeology ==
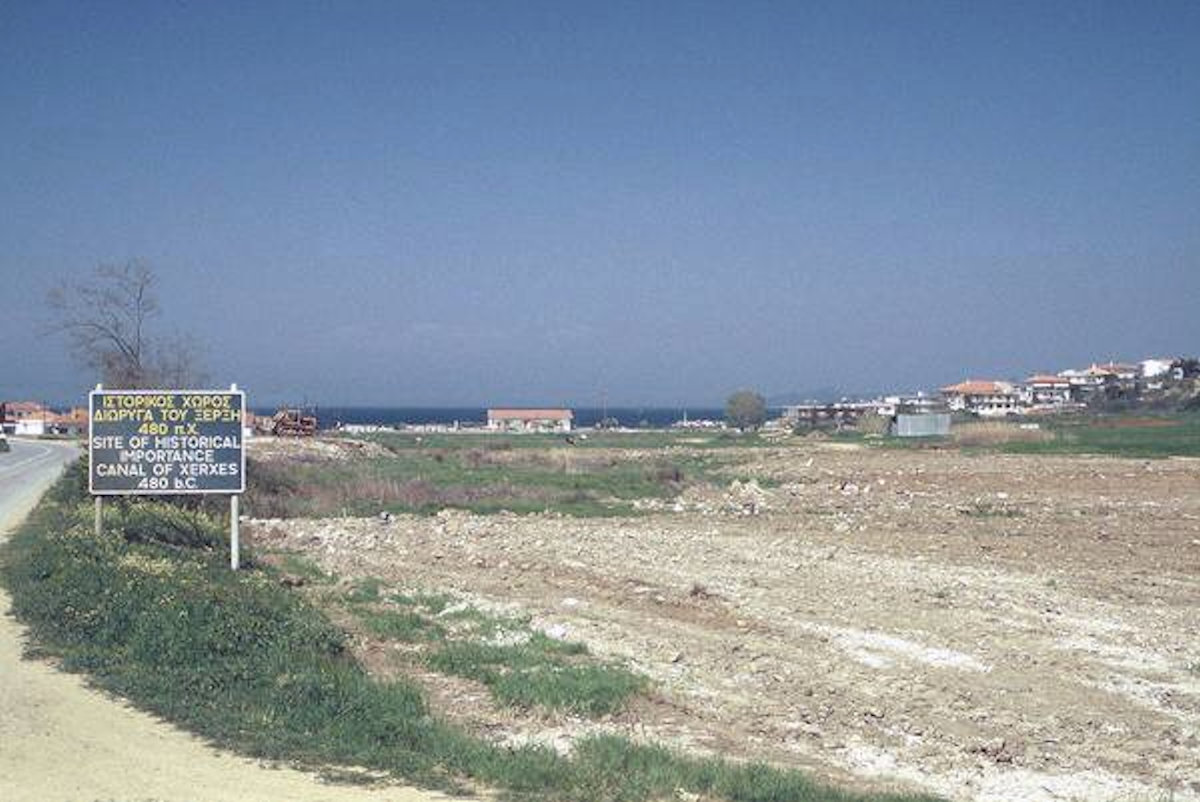
Northern end of the Canal of Xerxes, now filled up.

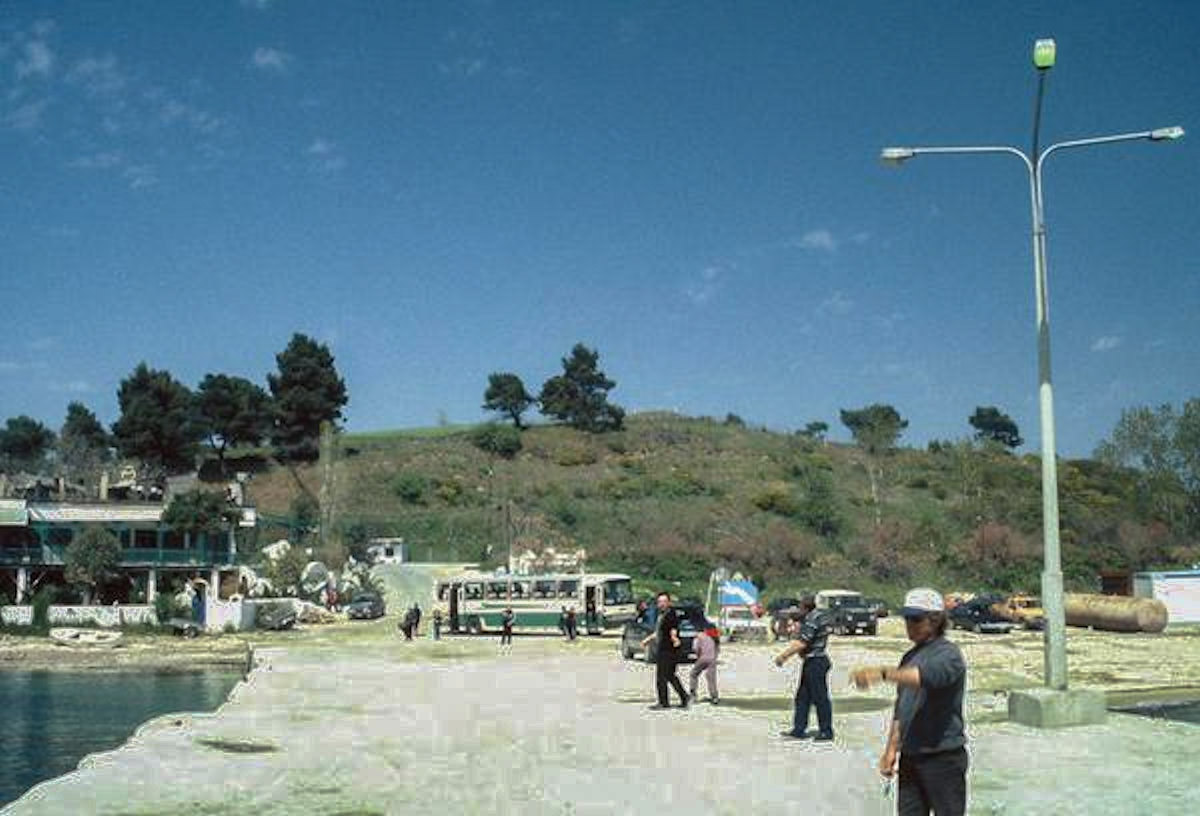
Funeral mound at the southern end of the Canal of Xerxes

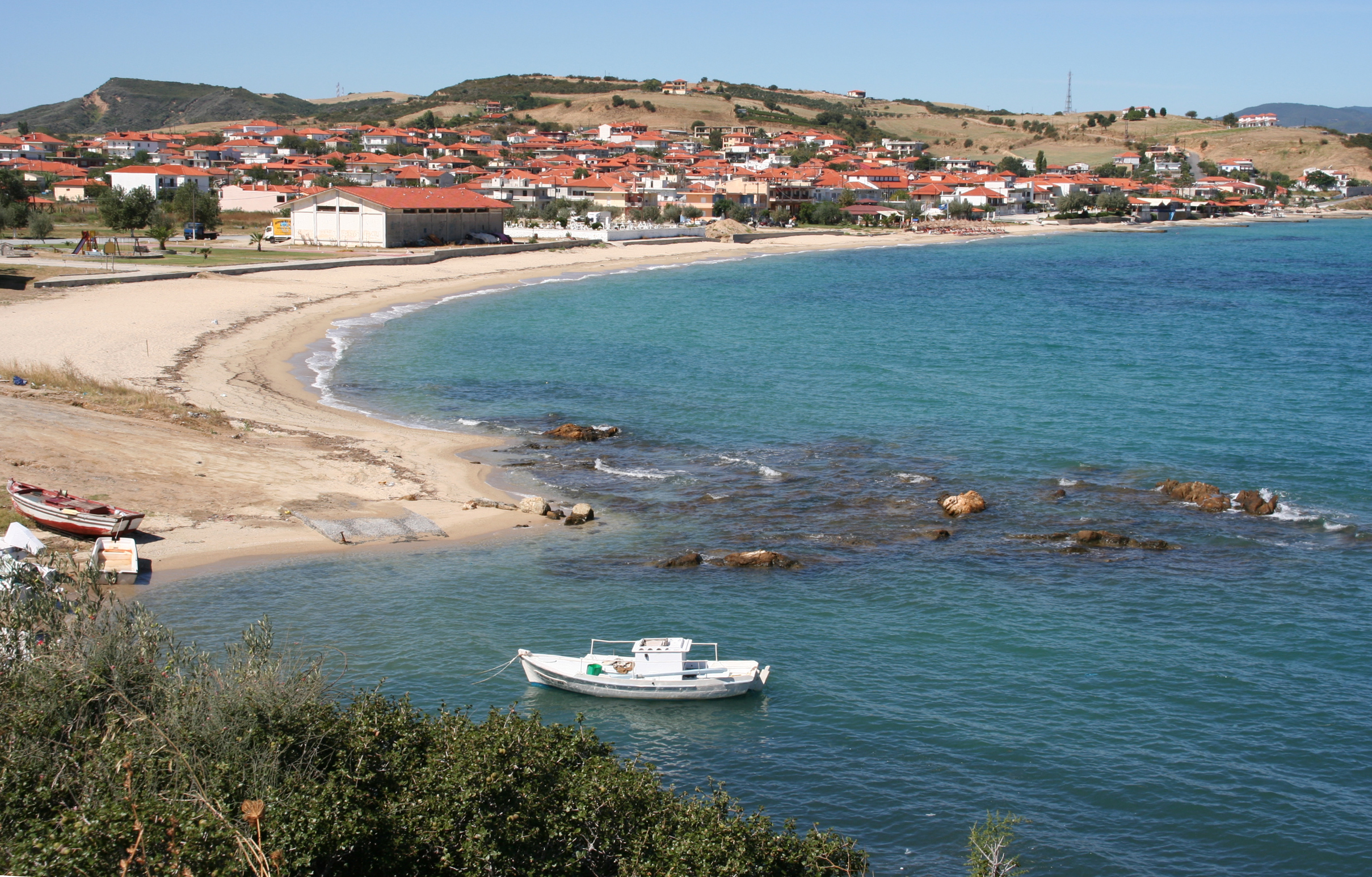
Location of the northern entrance of the canal (cove to the left).

The veracity of Herodotus' claims was doubted already in ancient times, but land surveys and geophysical investigations of the peninsula have confirmed the canal's existence.

In the second century BC, Demetrius of Scepsis stated—based on first-hand information—that there had indeed been a canal there, but he could not trace all of it.

Three separate modern land surveys, led by the Frenchman M. Choiseul-Gouffier in the 18th century, by T. Spratt of England in 1838, and by the German A. Struck in 1901, all found evidence of the canal in the central part of the isthmus. But as late as 1990 the length and width of the canal were in dispute, as was the question of whether the canal reached all the way across the isthmus or if ships were dragged through parts of it.

A British and Greek collaborative geophysical investigation launched in the 1990s found, using seismic survey and sediment analysis, that the canal had crossed the whole isthmus. Herodotus' account was vindicated, as they also confirmed that the canal was constructed rapidly and that it was only used for a short period of time.

Some studies suggest the workers were both regular Achaemenid soldiers and recruited local Balkan people (Thracians and Greeks) with the legal status of kurtaš, who were paid for and fed from the Persian treasury.

== See also ==
- Xerxes' Pontoon Bridges

== Bibliography ==
=== Ancient sources ===
- Herodotus, The Histories
- Thucydides, History of the Peloponnesian War

=== Modern sources ===
- B.S.J. Isserlin, R.E. Jones, V. Karastathis, S.P. Papamarinopoulos, G.E. Syrides, J. Uren: "The Canal of Xerxes: Summary of Investigations 1991–2001" Annual of the British School at Athens Vol. 98 (2003), pp. 369–85 https://www.jstor.org/stable/30073214
- B.S.J. Isserlin: ”The Canal of Xerxes: Facts and Problems”. Annual of the British School at Athens 86 (1991), 83–91.
- B.S.J. Isserlin, R.E. Jones, S.P. Papamarinopoulos, J. Uren: “The Canal of Xerxes: Preliminary Investigations in 1991 and 1992”. Annual of the British School at Athens 89 (1994), 277–84.
- B.S.J. Isserlin, R.E. Jones, S.P. Papamarinopoulos, G.E. Syrides, Y. Maniatis, Y. Facorellis, J. Uren: “The Canal of Xerxes: Investigations in 1993–1994”. Annual of the British School at Athens 91 (1996), 329–40.
- B.S.J. Isserlin, R.E. Jones, V. Karastathis, S.P. Papamarinopoulos, G.E. Syrides, J. Uren: "The Canal of Xerxes: Summary of Investigations 1991–2001". Annual of the British School at Athens Vol. 98 (2003), pp. 369–85 https://www.jstor.org/stable/30073214
- R.E. Jones, B.S.J. Isserlin, V.K. Karastathis, S.P. Papamarinopoulos, G.E. Syrides, J. Uren, I. Balatsas, Ch. Kapopoulos, Y. Maniatis, Y. Facorellis: ”Exploration of the Canal of Xerxes, Northern Greece: the Role of Geophysical and Other Yechniques“. Archaeological Prospection 7 (2000), 147–70 (Abstract).
- V.K. Karastathis, S.P. Papamarinopoulos: ”Preliminary Results of the Implementation of the Shallow Seismic Techniques in Order to Detect the King Xerxes' Canal“. Extended Abstract. Newsletter (European Geophysical Society) 53 (1994), 8–9.
- V.K. Karastathis, S.P. Papamarinopoulos: “The Detection of the Xerxes Canal by the Use of Shallow Reflection and Refraction Seismics – Preliminary Results”. Geophysical Prospecting 45 (1997), 389–401 (Abstract).
- V.K. Karastathis, S.P. Papamarinopoulos, R.E. Jones: “2-D Velocity Structure of the Buried Ancient Canal of Xerxes: An Application of Seismic Methods in Archaeology”. Journal of Applied Geophysics 47 (2001), 29–43.
- Y. Bhattacharjee: “Persian Canal Discovery Is Testament to Ancient Engineering Skills”. The New York Times, 13. November 2001 (Text).
