= Aesymnetes =

Aesymnetes (Greek: αἰσυμνήτης, from αἶσα, aisa, a "just portion", hence "a person who gives everyone their just portion") was the name of an ancient Greek elected office similar to, and sometimes indistinguishable from, tyrant. The plural is aesymnetai.

The title originally signified merely a judge in the heroic games, but afterwards indicated an individual who was occasionally invested voluntarily by his fellow citizens with essentially unlimited power in a Greek state. Aristotle called the office an "elective tyranny", and said that the power of the aesymnetai partook in some degree of the nature "both of kingly and tyrannical authority; since he was appointed legally and ruled over willing subjects, but at the same time was not bound by any laws in his public administration."

Hence Theophrastus calls the office τυραννὶς αἱρετή ("elective tyranny"), and Dionysius compares it with the dictatorship at Rome. It was not hereditary; but it was sometimes held for life, and at other times only until some object was accomplished, such as the reconciling of the various factions in the state. There is only one recorded instant of a person expressly receiving the title of Aesymnetes: Pittacus, in Mytilene, who was appointed to this dignity because the state had been long torn asunder by the various factions, and who succeeded in restoring peace and order by his wise regulations and laws.

There were, however, no doubt many other persons who ruled under this title for a while in the various states of Greece, and those law-givers bore a strong resemblance to the aesymnetai, whom their fellow citizens appointed with supreme power to enact laws, as Dracon, Solon, Zaleucus and Charondas. In some states, such as Cyme and Chalcedon, it was the title borne by the regular magistrates.

According to Aristotle, the office fell into disuse due to the risk of those who would not willingly relinquish the office, and the Greek States allowed it to disappear altogether.

== See also ==
- Elective dictatorship - a similar concept in parliamentary government
