= Johannes Kromayer =

German classical historian (1859–1934)

Johannes Kromayer (31 July 1859 in Stralsund – 23 September 1934 in Berlin) was a German classical historian. He was an older brother of dermatologist Ernst Kromayer (1862–1933).

He studied classical philology and ancient history at the universities of Jena and Strasbourg, then afterwards worked as a schoolteacher in Thann (1884–88), Metz (1888–93) and Strasbourg (1893–1900). In 1898 he obtained his habilitation for ancient history, and in 1902 became an associate professor at the University of Czernowitz (full professor 1903). From 1913 to 1927 he was a professor of ancient history at the University of Leipzig.

In 1900 he took part in an expedition to Greece in order to study ancient battlefield sites. In 1907/08 he studied ancient battlefields in Italy and North Africa. As a result of his research, he published the four-volume Antike Schlachtfelder ("Ancient Battlefields", 1903–1931).

== Selected works ==
- Antike Schlachtfelder (4 volumes, 1903–1931) – Ancient battlefields.
  - Antike Schlachtfelder in Griechenland. Bausteine zu einer antiken Kriegsgeschichte. Von Epaminondas bis zum Eingreifen der Römer, (1903) – Ancient battlefields in Greece; Building blocks of ancient military history, from Epaminondas until the arrival of the Romans.Antike Schlachtfelder The Heidelberg Site has medium and high resolution scans of all 4 volumes (in 5 bks),incl. the Maps HEIDI (uni-heidelberg.de)
  - Antike Schlachtfelder in Griechenland. Bausteine zu einer antiken Kriegsgeschichte. Die hellenistisch-römische Periode: Von Kynoskephalae bis Pharsalos, (1907) – Ancient battlefields in Greece; Building blocks of ancient military history, The Hellenistic-Roman period, from Cynoscephalae to Pharsalos.
  - Antike Schlachtfelder in Italien und Afrika (with Georg Veith, 2 parts, 1912) – Ancient battlefields in Italy and Africa.
  - Antike Schlachtfelder. Bausteine zu einer antiken Kriegsgeschichte. (Ergänzungsband). Schlachtfelder aus den Perserkriegen, aus der späteren griechischen Geschichte und den Feldzügen Alexanders und aus der römischen Geschichte bis Augustus, (1924–31) – Ancient battlefields; Ancient military history. (Supplement). Battlefields of the Persian Wars, from the later Greek history and the campaigns of Alexander and from Roman history to Augustus.
- Roms Kampf um die Weltherrrschaft, 1912 – Rome's struggle for world dominion.
- Römische Geschichte (with Ludo Moritz Hartmann, 1919) – Roman history.
- Drei Schlachten aus dem griechisch-römischen Altertum, 1921 – Three battles from Greco-Roman antiquity.
- Schlachten-Atlas zur antiken Kriegsgeschichte (with Georg Veith, 1922–29) – (translated into English in 2008 as "The battle atlas of ancient military history").

Schlachten-Atlas Zur Antiken Kriegsgeschichte The Heidelberg Site has medium and high resolution scans of all HEIDI (uni-heidelberg.de) Parts 1-5.2 (Note: Pt.6 was never published, thus the total number of maps is very slightly short of 120)

- Anleitung für das Studium der Geschichte, 1925 – Instructions for the study of history.
- Heerwesen und Kriegführung der Griechen und Römer, (with Georg Veith and August Köster, 1928) – Military affairs and warfare of the Greeks and Romans.
