= Xenagoras (geometer) =

Xenagoras (Ancient Greek: Ξεναγόρας), son of Eumelus, was mentioned by Plutarch as having been among the first to make a scientific measurement of the heights of mountains. This Xenagoras estimated the height of the shrine of Apollo atop Mount Olympus as a little more than 10 stadia, that is, roughly 6,096 feet. (The mountain is in fact 9,573 feet.) There are some ancient references to a (now lost) book Measurement of Mountains by a "Xenophon" that some scholars consider to be a reference to this Xenagoras, albeit with the wrong name.
