= Paul A. Rahe =

American historian and writer (born 1948)

- Born: December 18, 1948 (age 77); United States
- Education: Yale University (BA, PhD); Wadham College, Oxford (BA)
- Occupations: Historian, author, writer, professor

Paul Anthony Rahe (born December 18, 1948) is an American classicist, historian, writer and professor of history at Hillsdale College. He taught at Yale University, Cornell University, Franklin and Marshall College, and the University of Tulsa before taking up his present position.

Rahe comments with some frequency on political matters and blogs with some regularity for Ricochet.

== Biography ==
Rahe received a B.A. in history from Yale University in 1971, where he graduated Phi Beta Kappa. He then read Literae Humaniores at Wadham College, Oxford on a Rhodes scholarship, receiving a B.A. in 1974. He received his PhD in history at Yale University in 1977. His political positions are conservative. In 2016, he referred to Republican nominee Donald Trump as a "slimeball," but endorsed him for president nonetheless because of his revulsion at Democratic nominee Hillary Clinton's "depravity". In 2020, he unreservedly endorsed Donald Trump for president. He is married to Laura Rahe, a lawyer and the author of a book on courtship and marriage.

== Bibliography ==
- Republics Ancient and Modern: Classical Republicanism and the American Revolution (University of North Carolina Press, 1992)
- Against Throne and Altar: Machiavelli and Political Theory under the English Republic (Cambridge University Press, 2008)
- Montesquieu and the Logic of Liberty: War, Religion, Commerce, Climate, Terrain, Technology, Uneasiness of Mind, The Spirit of Political Vigilance, and the Foundations of the Modern Republic (Yale University Press, 2009)
- Soft Despotism, Democracy's Drift: Montesquieu, Rousseau, Tocqueville and the Modern Prospect (Yale University Press, 2009)
- The Spartan Regime: Its Character, Origins, and Grand Strategy (Yale University Press, 2016)
- The Grand Strategy of Classical Sparta: The Persian Challenge (Yale University Press, 2015)
- Sparta's First Attic War: The Grand Strategy of Classical Sparta, 478-446 B.C. (Yale University Press, 2019)
- Sparta's Second Attic War: The Grand Strategy of Classical Sparta, 446-418 B.C. (Yale University Press, 2020)

=== Edited ===
- Machiavelli's Liberal Republican Legacy (Cambridge University Press, 2006)
- Montesquieu's Science of Politics: Essays on The Spirit of Laws (Rowman and Littlefield, 2001)(co-edited)

=== Other publications ===
He has published scholarly articles in The American Journal of Philology, Historia: Zeitschrift fur Alte Geschichte, The American Journal of Archaeology, The American Historical Review, Ciceroniana, The Review of Politics, The Political Science Reviewer, The Journal of Business and Professional Ethics, The Journal of the Historical Society, Security Studies, The History of Political Thought, Social Philosophy & Policy, 1650–1850: Ideas, Inquiries, and Aesthetics in the Early Modern Era, History of European Ideas, The Catholic Social Science Review, Citizens and Statesmen, Reason Papers, and The Journal of Policy History, and he has contributed articles of general interest and book reviews to The American Spectator, Humanities, The Wilson Quarterly, The American Oxonian, The National Interest, Commentary, The American Interest, Reason, The American Scholar, The Claremont Review of Books, National Review, National Review Online, The Washington Times, and The Wall Street Journal. He is currently working on a book tentatively entitled The Grand Strategy of Classical Sparta: The Athenian Challenge.

== Awards and honors ==
Rahe was a Rhodes Scholar at Oxford and has been awarded fellowships by the Center for Hellenic Studies, The National Humanities Center, the Institute of Current World Affairs, the John M. Olin Foundation, the Center for the History of Freedom at Washington University, the National Endowment for the Humanities, the Woodrow Wilson International Center for Scholars, Clair Hall at Cambridge University, All Souls College at Oxford University, The American Academy in Berlin, the Social Philosophy and Policy Center at Bowling Green University, and the Hoover Institution. In 2006, the French Historical Society awarded him the Koren Prize for the Best Article Published in French History in 2005.
