= Strattis of Chios =

6th/5th-century BC Greek tyrant of Chios

Strattis of Chios was an ancient Greek tyrant who ruled the Aegean island of Chios during the late 6th and early 5th centuries BC.

Strattis was one of a group of Greek tyrants from Ionia and the Hellespont who were vassals of the Persian king Darius I and accompanied him on his Scythian campaign in 513 BC. The Greeks were ordered to guard the bridge over the Danube River in order to secure it for Darius's return. When a debate arose among the Greeks as to whether or not to destroy the bridge and leave Darius stranded, Strattis supported Histiaeus of Miletus who convinced the Greeks not to destroy the bridge.

When the Persian general Mardonius removed the Ionian tyrants and restored democracy to the region in 492 BC, Strattis of Chios was the only tyrant known to retain his position. This was possibly because of the fierce resistance to the Persians put up by the Chian fleet at the Battle of Lade (494 BC), when Chios had a democratic government.

In 480 BC, there was a conspiracy by seven Chians who plotted to kill Strattis, but when one of their number betrayed the plot, the other six fled to Sparta and Aegina.
