= Xenagoras of Halicarnassus =

Colleague of 5th-century BC Achaemenid commander Masistes

Xenagoras (Ancient Greek: Ξεναγόρας) of Halicarnassus, son of Praxilaus, was a Carian mentioned by Herodotus as a commander and colleague of Masistes, son of Darius I. Xenagoras intervened when a conflict between Masistes and fellow commander Artayntes became violent, and prevented Artayntes from slaying Masistes. In doing this, Xenagoras obtained the gratitude and favor of both Masistes and Xerxes the Great, king of the Achaemenid Empire and brother of Masistes. Because of this, Xenagoras was made the king of Cilicia by Xerxes. Later scholars have observed that Cilicia was not then a satrap of the Achaemenid Empire, and had been governed by its own native kings -- the dynasty of Syennesis -- so Xenagoras's position here was likely subordinate to one of these
