= The Return (2024 film) =

2024 film by Uberto Pasolini

- Theatrical release poster
- Directed by: Uberto Pasolini
- Screenplay by: John Collee; Edward Bond; Uberto Pasolini
- Based on: The Odyssey by Homer
- Produced by: Uberto Pasolini; Roberto Sesso; Giorgos Karnavas; Konstantinos Kontovrakis; Stéphane Moatti; Romain Le Grand; Vivien Aslanian; Marco Pacchioni
- Starring: Ralph Fiennes; Juliette Binoche; Charlie Plummer
- Cinematography: Marius Panduru
- Edited by: David Charap
- Music by: Rachel Portman
- Production companies: Red Wave Films; HanWay Films; Heretic; Picomedia; Rai Cinema; Kabo Films; Marvelous Production
- Distributed by: Modern Films (United Kingdom); 01 Distribution (Italy)
- Release dates: September 7, 2024 (TIFF); January 30, 2025 (Italy); April 11, 2025 (United Kingdom)
- Running time: 116 minutes
- Countries: Italy; Greece; United Kingdom
- Language: English
- Box office: $3.2 million

The Return is a 2024 drama film directed by Uberto Pasolini and starring Ralph Fiennes and Juliette Binoche. The film is a retelling of the second half of Homer's Odyssey where Odysseus returns to his homeland in Ithaca after his long absence as adapted by Edward Bond, John Collee, and Pasolini.

It premiered in the Gala section at the Toronto International Film Festival on September 7, 2024, and was released in the United States by Bleecker Street on December 6, 2024. It was released in the UK and Ireland on April 11, 2025 by Modern Films, with event screenings in advance at the British Museum on April 9 and Curzon Mayfair on April 10. Reception of the film was positive, with praise for Fiennes and Binoche's acting and for the film's visuals, realism, and "stripped back" approach, but some criticized the omissions and departures from the original epic in its characterization of Odysseus.

== Plot ==
Twenty years after setting off to fight in the Trojan War and surviving many trials, Odysseus washes up naked on the shores of his home island Ithaca. He is found and tended to by the slaves Eumaeus and Yias. Odysseus is dispirited and traumatized by his experiences and learns about the decline of his kingdom.

Odysseus's wife Penelope faces pressure to find a suitor, given that many believe her husband to be dead. Her son Telemachus is approached by the nobleman Antinous, who attempts to convince him to press Penelope into marriage. The young man refuses, distrusting Antinous and the Suitors of Penelope.

Penelope weaves her elderly father-in-law's burial shroud before his impending death. Telemachus asks her to take a suitor to end the chaos, but she refuses until she completes the shroud. Odysseus's father dies; the suitors interrupt his funeral to threaten Penelope and her son unless a decision is made. Penelope fends them off by saying that now, she must weave a cloak for her wedding and only then will she choose.

Eumaeus takes Odysseus to the palace, where the hunting dog Argos recognizes his master after a long wait and then dies. Odysseus poses as a beggar to ask for alms; the suitors abuse him. They force him to fight a huge man, but Odysseus kills him. Suspicious, Penelope speaks to Odysseus but ends up ordering him to be tended to and sent off after he refuses to answer her questions.

Odysseus's old nursemaid Eurycleia discovers his identity while bathing him, after recognizing a scar on the back of his leg. He bids her be silent. Antinous persuades the suitors to form a hunting party and kill Telemachus while he is out walking in the woods, but Odysseus intervenes and reveals himself to his son. Odysseus, Telemachus, and Eumaeus flee, while Yias is killed by the suitor Eurymachus. Failing to find their quarry, the hunting party returns to the palace. Telemachus and Eumaeus rebuke Odysseus for his cowardice and question why he would even bother to return, having heard rumors that he abandoned Penelope for Calypso.

Antinous discovers Penelope unraveling her weaving at night. The next day, Odysseus learns that his wife has decided on who shall marry her. He arrives at the palace right as Penelope tells the suitors that her choice is to make them compete with Odysseus's old bow, seeing if they can shoot an arrow through the holes of multiple axe heads, as he did in his youth. None of them can even string the bow properly, and Antinous goads them into once again threatening Penelope with harm.

Odysseus then offers to try, strings it, and shoots the arrow through the axe heads. He then starts killing the suitors as the royal servants close the doors to prevent escape. When his arrows run out, Odysseus relentlessly kills the few who remain by hand. Telemachus is tempted to flee, but he helps his father fight. Antinous surrenders, and Penelope, desirous of peace and tired of the violence, bids Telemachus let him live. Telemachus instead decapitates him as Penelope can only scream in horror.

Telemachus insists on sailing off to find himself and his destiny. While begging Penelope to forgive him, Odysseus notices that she is using an unfamiliar bed. He goes to a hidden upper-level room and finds their old bed, which she had sealed away after he left. Odysseus and Penelope reconcile with each other and offer to share their past years to move on with their future together.

== Cast ==
The film's cast is as follows:

- Ralph Fiennes as Odysseus
- Juliette Binoche as Penelope
- Charlie Plummer as Telemachus
- Tom Rhys Harries as Pisander
- Marwan Kenzari as Antinous
- Claudio Santamaria as Eumaeus
- Ayman Al Aboud as Indius
- Amir Wilson as Philoetius
- Francesco Bianchi as Amphimedon
- Nicolas Retrivi as Elenus
- Bruno Cassandra as Promachus
- Jamie Andrew Cutler as Eurymachus
- Cosimo Desii as Eurydamus
- Nikitas Tsakiroglou as Laertes (Odysseus's father)
- Ángela Molina as Eurycleia
- Stefano Santomauro as Thoas

== Production ==
=== Development ===
Edward Bond's original screenplay was reported in January 2003. Neil Jordan was attached to direct the film and provide rewrites; Michael Kuhn financed the project through a deal with 20th Century Fox. In April 2003, Javier Bardem was reported to be in talks to play Odysseus. Producers hoped to begin principal photography by May but were unable to do so.

The project was resurrected in April 2022. The script for the film was written by John Collee and Edward Bond. The film's director, Uberto Pasolini, and James Clayton produced the film. Pasolini said he had been considering adapting Homer's Odyssey for 30 years; he asked Ralph Fiennes to act and direct in 2011. Fiennes said he couldn't do both, and in 2022 asked Pasolini to direct, with the latter accepting only when Fiennes pushed him. Pasolini asked Fiennes who should play Penelope, and Fiennes replied "Juliette [Binoche], of course". The film marked the third time Fiennes and Binoche have appeared together following 1992's Emily Brontë's Wuthering Heights and the 1996 Oscar winner The English Patient.

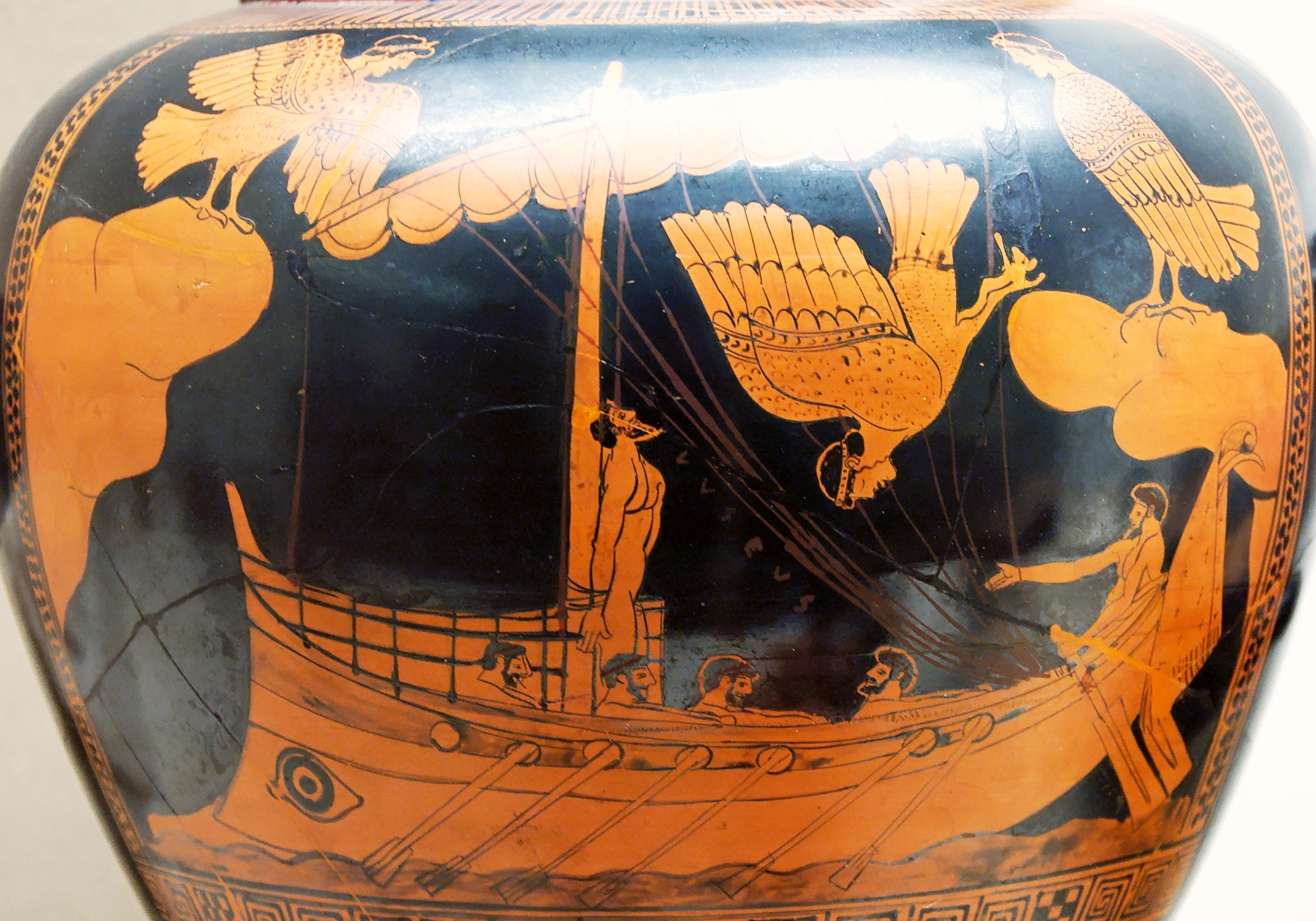
Pasolini chose to omit all the gods and mythical beings from his film, such as the sirens (pictured: Odysseus listening to the Sirens, 5th century BC vase painting) of Homer's poem.

HanWay Films began handling international sales and took the project to the 2022 Cannes Film Festival. In February 2023, Bleecker Street picked up North American rights and appointed Andrew Karpen and Kent Sanderson as executive producers. Roberto Sessa for Picomedia with Rai Cinema, Giorgos Karnavas and Konstantinos Kontovravkis for Heretic and Stéphane Moatti, Romain Le Grand, Vivien Aslanian and Marco Pacchioni for Kabo Films and Marvelous Production were producers on the Italy-Greece-U.K.-France co-production.

The Return reworks only the second half of the Odyssey; it omits the whole account of Odysseus's wanderings, including the blinding of the Cyclops, Circe's transformation of Odysseus's men into pigs, and the island of the Sirens, and it does not feature the gods of the original poem. Pasolini said that his Odysseus had to feel that the guilt and pain from the siege of Troy and the deaths of his companions "was his own doing". Fiennes did physical training for five months to acquire the wiry and muscular body that Pasolini wanted for Odysseus, followed by 2 1/2 months of running and weight training to reduce his body fat as far as possible. Odysseus's body was intended to look "like a bit of old rope" rather than a "gym body", in Fiennes's words.

=== Filming ===
The film began production in Greece in the spring of 2023, with principal photography in the regions of Corfu and the Peloponnese, specifically at Angelokastro and Chlemoutsi respectively, before continuing on to locations in Italy. Filming had wrapped in Corfu by June 2023. Other scenes were shot in the country to the north of Rome. The total cost of filming was $20 million, compared to the $250 million spent on Christopher Nolan's 2026 The Odyssey.

=== Music ===
The music for The Return was composed by Rachel Portman and performed by Roma Film Orchestra, conducted by Emanuele Bossi. It was released on Digital Records.

== Release ==
In July 2024, The Return was announced as part of the Gala section at the Toronto International Film Festival scheduled for September 2024. The film was theatrically released on December 6, 2024, in the United States by Bleecker Street. Distributed by 01 Distribution, it was released in cinemas in Italy on January 30, 2025. It was featured in the Limelight section of the 54th International Film Festival Rotterdam, to be screened in February 2025.

== Reception ==
On the review aggregator website Rotten Tomatoes, 78% of 85 critics' reviews are positive. The website's consensus reads: "The Return removes the mythology from Odysseus' homecoming along with some of the fun, but Ralph Fiennes and Juliette Binoche's terrific performances keep this drama absorbing." Metacritic, which uses a weighted average, assigned the film a score of 66 out of 100, based on 26 critics, indicating "generally favorable" reviews.

Katie Walsh in the Los Angeles Times calls the film "an acting showcase", with Jeannette Catsoulis in The New York Times also praising strong performances by Fiennes and Binoche. Reviewers, including Corey Atad in the Toronto Star, noted the Shakespearean quality of the drama. Radheyan Simonpillai in The Guardian called the film a "handsome, sombre and meditative take" on Homer's poem. In his view, Pasolini's approach is admirable for its "narrative restraint", and visually splendid, but lacking in other ways; he thinks Fiennes and Binoche's performances are excellent, but the supporting cast "leaden by comparison".

Ben Nicholson, in a review for the British Film Institute, writes that leaving out all the "supernatural winds" and mythical beings permits Pasolini to tell the tale realistically and foregrounds the characters' psychology. He finds both the narrative and the filmmaking "stripped back", with "elegant and understated" cinematography. The result, writes Nicholson, is a "nuanced psychological drama" that takes an unflinching look at the story, providing "gripping" cinema. Ian Haydn Smith, for the International Film Festival Rotterdam, describes the film as an "emotionally intense drama, rapturously shot by Marius Panduru". He finds Fiennes's subtle acting and physical transformation equally remarkable, ably matched by Binoche "at her most incandescent".

By contrast, Matt Zoller Seitz of RogerEbert.com wrote that "flat 'realism' in the action and filmmaking ... and a superimposing of contemporary psychodrama onto Homer's myths, is at odds with the material in fundamental ways", resulting in "a thoughtfully acted but solemn slog". In Seitz's view, the film asks Fiennes to do "an awful lot of silent musing" that just tells the audience what they already know, and the loss of the supernatural takes away much of Odysseus's "vigor and depth".

The film's reception among classics scholars was mixed. Joel P. Christensen, a classics professor at the CUNY Graduate Center and specialist on the Homeric epics, described the film in a negative review for Hyperallergic as "a shabby CliffNotes version of the Odyssey." Christensen especially criticized the film's characterization of Odysseus, which he viewed as shallow compared to that of the original epic, writing that, in contrast, to Homer's Odysseus, Fiennes's Odysseus is "laconic" and "doesn't tell stories of his past or use them to manipulate others." Christensen also criticized the film's lack of attention to the original epic's themes of storytelling and identity. By contrast, Emily Wilson, a classics professor at the University of Pennsylvania known for her 2017 translation of the Odyssey, praised The Return (in contrast to Christopher Nolan's 2026 film The Odyssey) for its "stylish sparseness," saying that it "invited us to wonder what remains of The Odyssey and its hero when stripped down to the sinews and the hungry heart."

== See also ==
- Odyssey#Film and television – earlier films of the Odyssey
