= Evenorides =

Character in Greek mythology

In Greek mythology, Evenorides (Ancient Greek: Εὐηνορίδης means "son of Evenor") may refer to two Suitors of Penelope.

- Evenorides, from Dulichium, came with other 56 wooers.
- Evenorides, from Zacynthus, came with other 43 wooers. He might be a son of Evenor (as what his name suggests) and brother of Leiocritus, another suitor of the queen of Ithaca.

Both Evenorides asked the hand in marriage of Penelope but suffered the same fate, as well as the other wooers, at the hands of the hero Odysseus. The latter shot all of them dead with the aid of Eumaeus, Philoetius, and Telemachus.
