= Paralus (mythology) =

Character in Greek mythology

In Greek mythology, Paralus (Ancient Greek: Πάραλος means 'sea-side') was of the Suitors of Penelope who came from Dulichium along with other 56 wooers. He, with the other suitors, was slain by Odysseus with the aid of Eumaeus, Philoetius, and Telemachus.
