= Calydoneus =

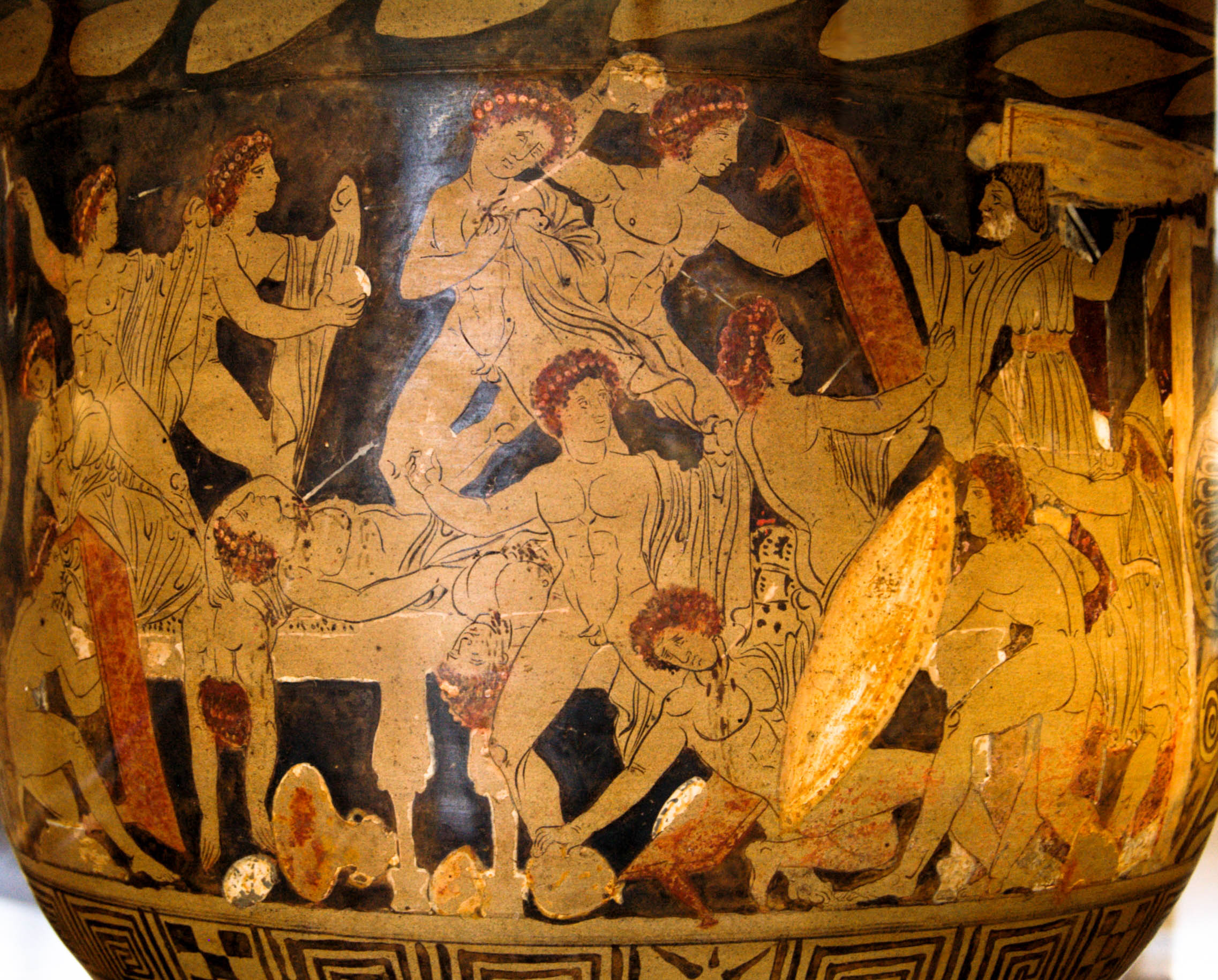
Slaughter of the suitors of Penelope by Odysseus and Telemachus, assisted by Eumaeus and Philoetius. Campanian red-figure bell-krater, ca. 330 BC, Louvre (CA 7124)

In Greek mythology, Calydoneus (Ancient Greek: Καλυδωνεὺς) was one of the suitors of Penelope who came from Dulichium along with either 56 other wooers (according to Apollodorus), or 51 (according to Homer). He, with the other suitors, was killed by Odysseus with the assistance of Eumaeus, Philoetius, and Telemachus.
