= Evenor =

Evenor (Ancient Greek: Εὐήνωρ or Εὐήνορα Euenor means 'joy of men') is the name of a character from the myth of Atlantis and of several historical figures.

== Mythological figures ==
- Evenor, father of Cleito by Leucippe.
- Evenor, the "brazen-tasleted" Achaean warrior who participated in the Trojan War. He was from Dulichium and was slain by Paris during the siege of Troy.
- Evenor, a Trojan soldier who was killed by Neoptolemus during the Trojan War. The latter smote Evenor above the flank and drove the spear into his liver which resulted to his swift anguished death.
- Evenor, father of Leocritus and possibly, of Evenorides, both were Suitors of Penelope.

== Historical figures ==
- Evenor, a Greek painter who flourished around 420 BC, the father and teacher of the better-known painter Parrhasius of Ephesus.
- Evenor, a Greek surgeon and medical author who lived in or before the 3rd century BC and apparently wrote about fractures and joint dislocations; if he is the same as an Evenor quoted by Pliny the Elder, he also wrote about the medicinal properties of plants.
