= Marpsius =

Greek mythological figure

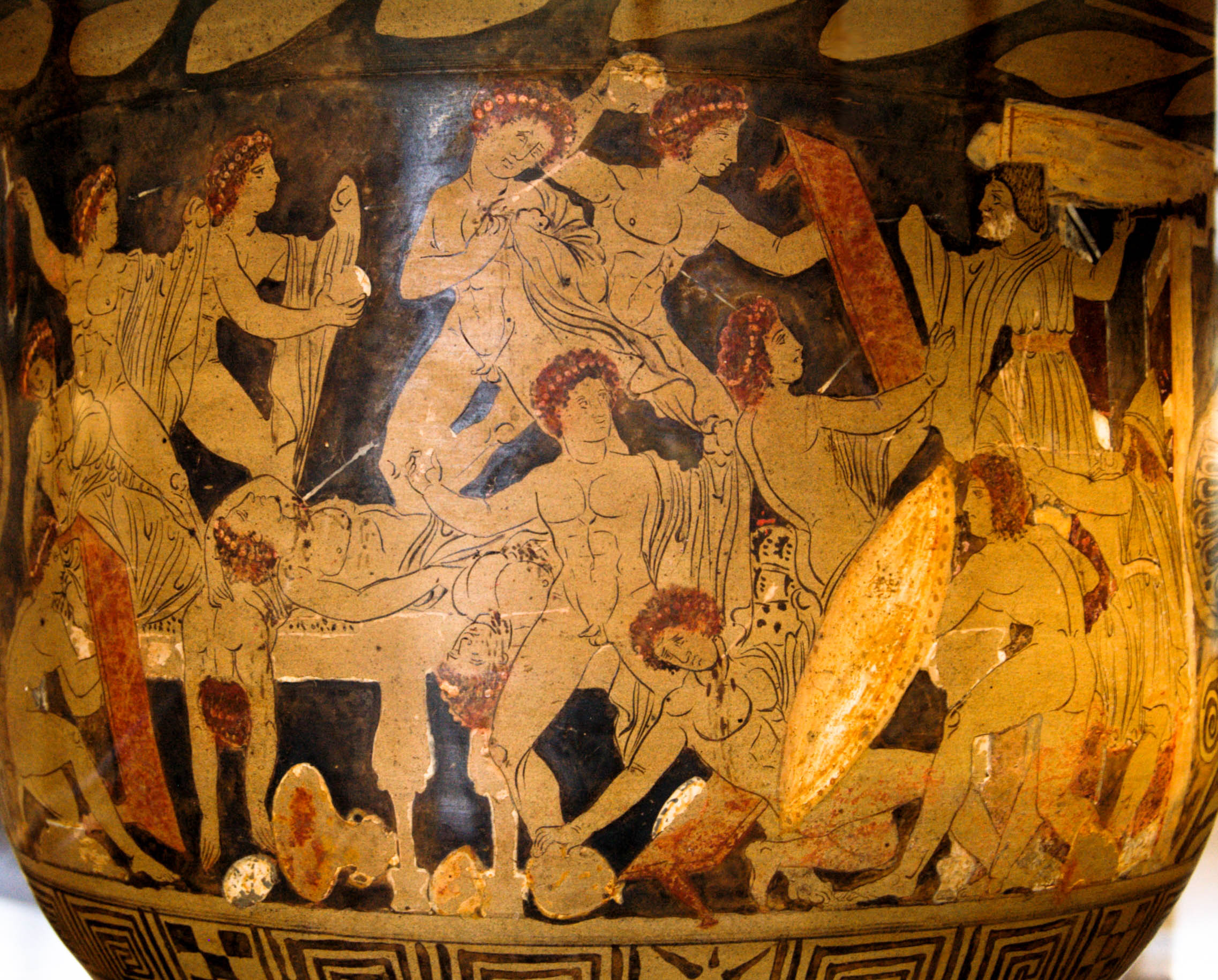
Slaughter of the suitors of Penelope by Odysseus and Telemachus, assisted by Eumaeus and Philoetius. Campanian red-figure bell-krater, ca. 330 BC, Louvre (CA 7124)

In Greek mythology, Marpsius (Ancient Greek: Μάρψιος) was one of the suitors of Penelope who came from Dulichium along with other 56 wooers. He, with the other suitors, was shot dead by Odysseus with the assistance of Eumaeus, Philoetius, and Telemachus.
