= Hellanicus (mythology) =

Suitor of Penelope in Greek mythology

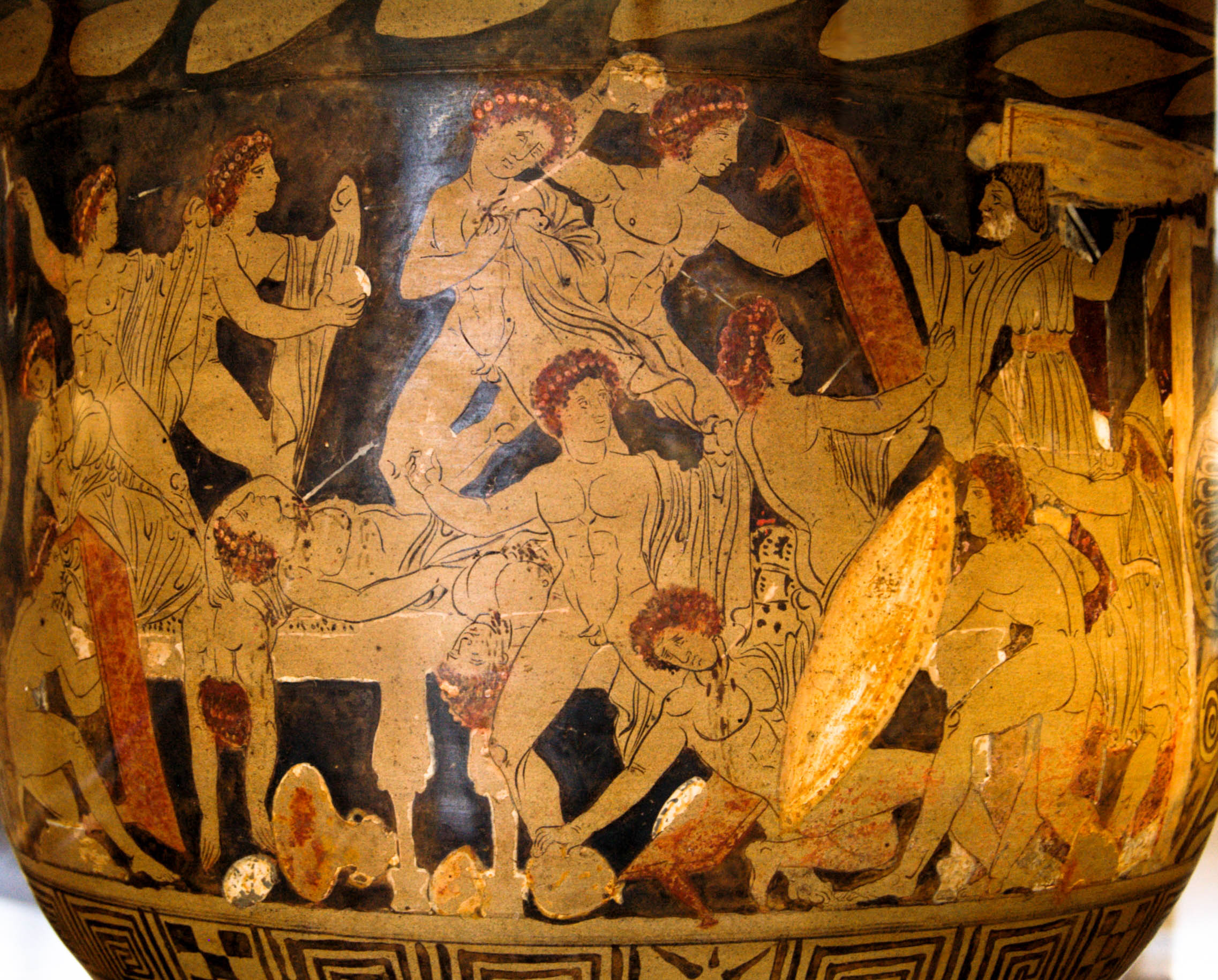
Slaughter of the suitors of Penelope by Odysseus and Telemachus, assisted by Eumaeus and Philoetius. Campanian red-figure bell-krater, ca. 330 BC, Louvre (CA 7124)

In Greek mythology, Hellanicus or Hellanikos (Ancient Greek: Ἑλλάνικος Ἑllánikos) was one of the suitors of Penelope who came from Dulichium along with other 56 wooers. He, with the other suitors, was killed by Odysseus with the help of Eumaeus, Philoetius, and Telemachus.
