= Hagius =

One of the suitors of Penelope in Greek mythology

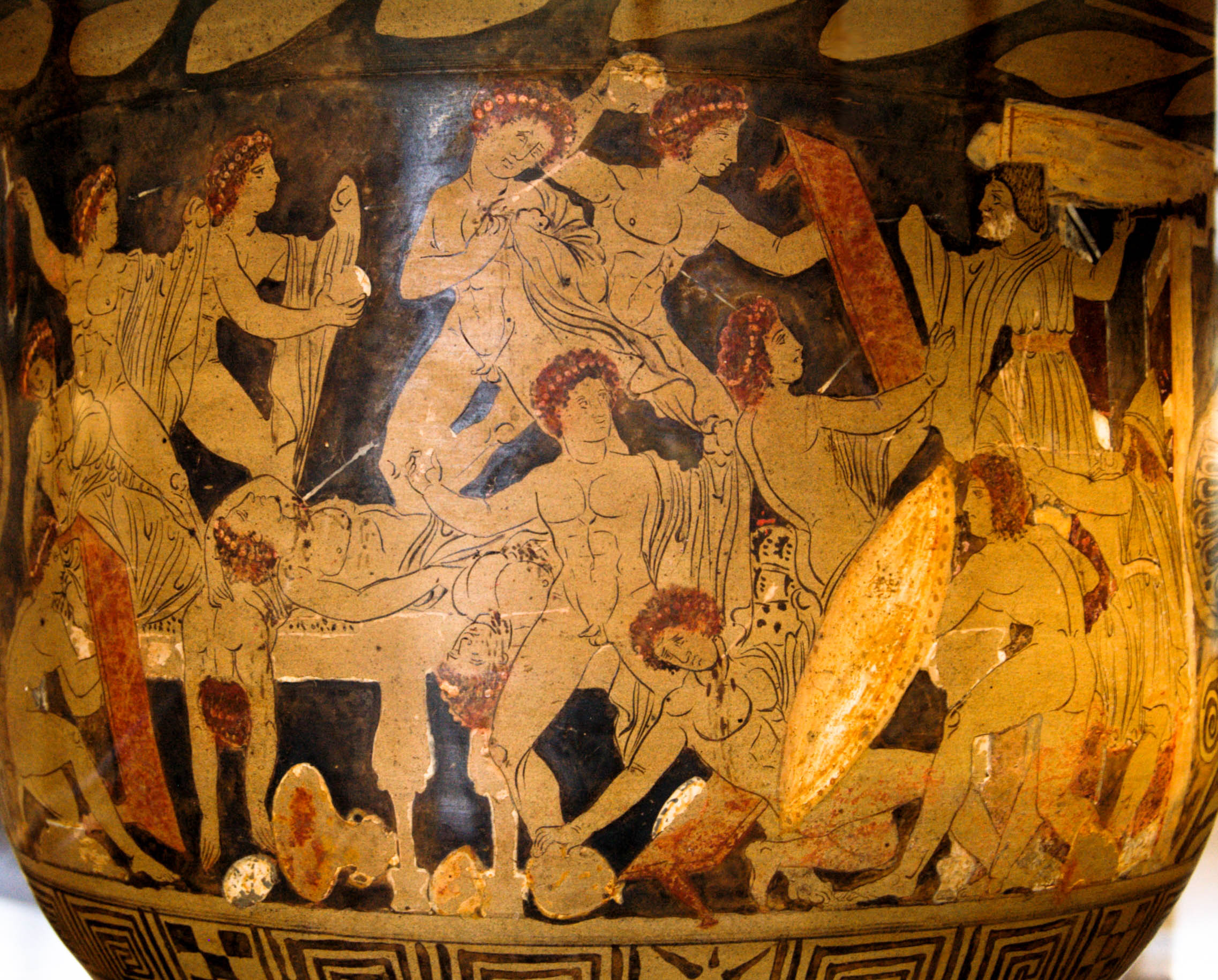
Slaughter of the suitors of Penelope by Odysseus and Telemachus, assisted by Eumaeus and Philoetius. Campanian red-figure bell-krater, ca. 330 BC, Louvre (CA 7124)

In Greek mythology, Hagius (Ancient Greek: Ἅγιος means 'devoted to the gods') was one of the suitors of Penelope, who came from Dulichium along with other 56 wooers. He, with the other suitors, was slain by Odysseus with the aid of Eumaeus, Philoetius, and Telemachus.
