= Phrenius =

Greek mythological character

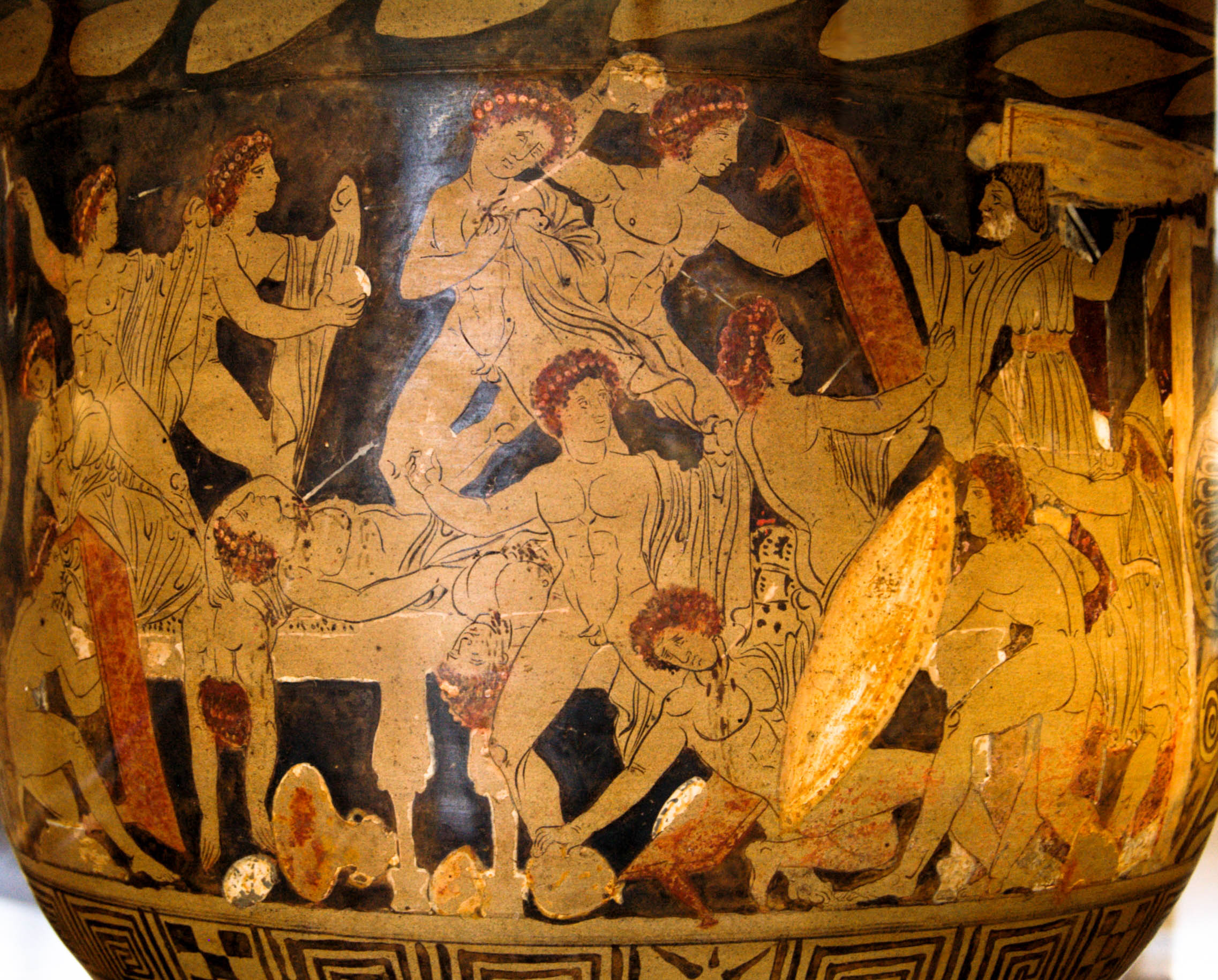
Slaughter of the suitors of Penelope by Odysseus and Telemachus, assisted by Eumaeus and Philoetius. Campanian red-figure bell-krater, ca. 330 BC, Louvre (CA 7124)

In Greek mythology, Phrenius (Ancient Greek: Φρένιος) was a name shared by two suitors of Penelope who came from Zacynthus along with other 42 wooers. Both of them were killed by Odysseus with the aid of Eumaeus, Philoetius, and Telemachus.
