= Indius =

Greek mythological character

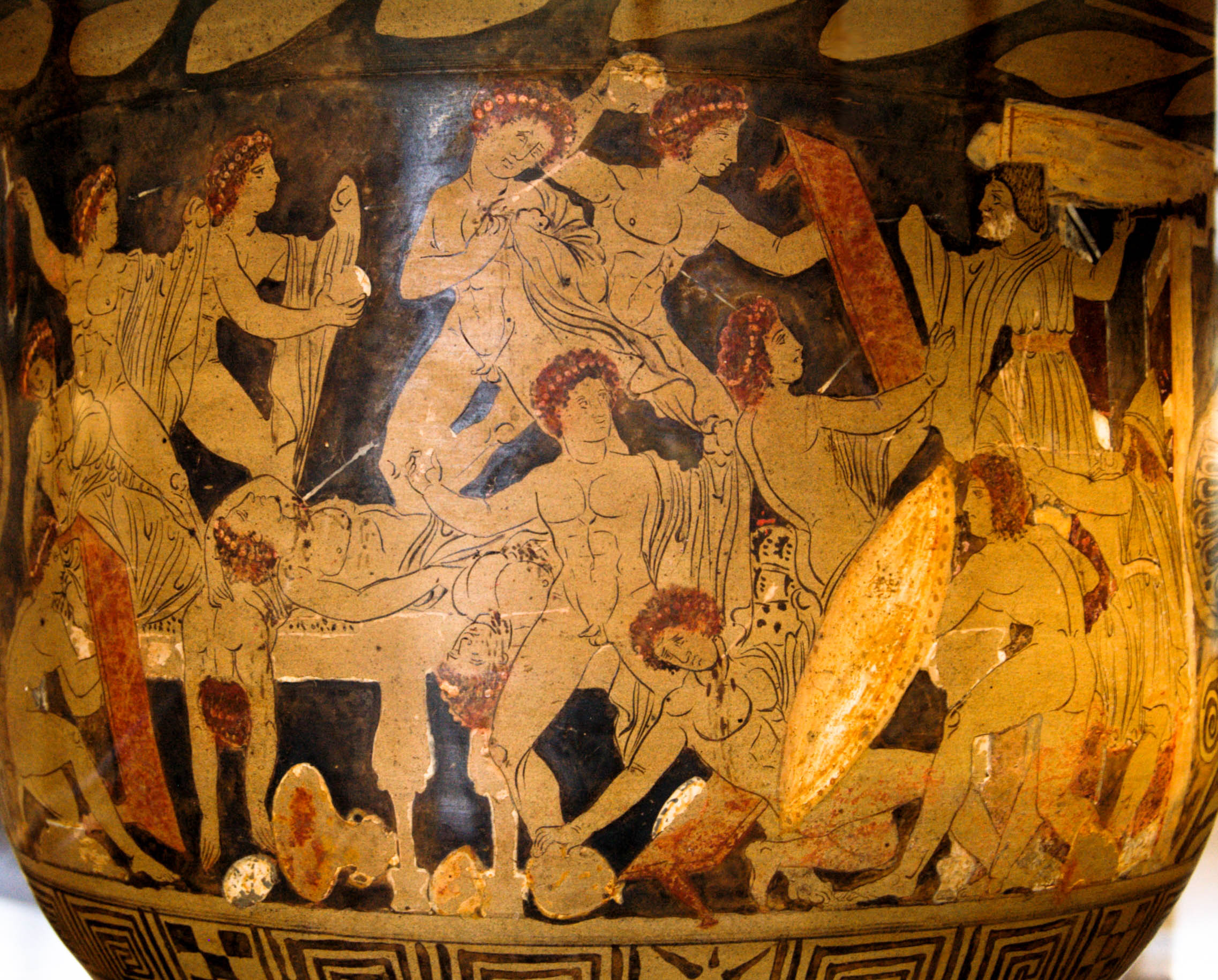
Slaughter of the suitors of Penelope by Odysseus and Telemachus, assisted by Eumaeus and Philoetius. Campanian red-figure bell-krater, ca. 330 BC, Louvre (CA 7124)

In Greek mythology, Indius (Ancient Greek: Ἴνδιος) was a name shared by two suitors of Penelope who came from Zacynthus along with 42 other wooers. Both of them were slain by Odysseus with the help of Eumaeus, Philoetius, and Telemachus.
