= Leodes =

Character in the Odyssey

In the Odyssey, Leodes, Leiodes or Liodes (/liˈoʊdiːz/; Ancient Greek: Λειώδης, romanized: Leiṓdēs, lit. 'smooth, even') was an Ithacan diviner and a minor suitor of Penelope. He had darkly predicted that Odysseus would return to avenge the suitors' abuse of hospitality.

== Family ==
Leodes was the son of Oenops.

== Mythology ==
As the sacrificial priest to the suitors, Leodes hated the evil deeds of the suitors and was indignant with the others. He was the first to test Odysseus' bow of which he said would break the heart and be the death of many. Leodes was the last person whom Odysseus killed in his homecoming rampage, decapitated while pleading for his life:

Leodes rushed in and caught the knees of Odysseus,
and spoke to him in winged words and supplication:

'I am at your knees, Odysseus. Respect me, have mercy;
for I claim that never in your halls did I say or do anything
wrong to any one of the women, but always was trying
to stop any one of the other suitors who acted in that way.
But they would not listen to me and keep their hands off evil.
So by their own recklessness they have found a shameful
death, but I was their diviner, and I did nothing;
but I must fall, since there is no gratitude for past favors.'

Then looking darkly at him spoke resourceful Odysseus:
'If you claim to be the diviner among these people,
many a time you must have prayed in my palace, asking
that the completion of my sweet homecoming be far off
from me, that my dear wife would go off with you, and bear you
children. So you cannot escape from sorry destruction.'

So he spoke, and in his heavy hand caught up a sword
that was lying there on the ground where Agelaos had dropped it
when he was killed. With this he cut through the neck at the middle,
and the head of Leodes dropped in the dust while he was still speaking.

— Odyssey, Lattimore translation, XXII. 310–329
