= Demoptolemus =

Greek mythical character

In Homer's Odyssey, Demoptolemus (/ˌdɛməpˈtɒlɪməs/; Ancient Greek: Δημοπτόλεμος, romanized: Dēmoptólemos) was one of the 108 suitors of the queen of Ithaca, Penelope. He came from Dulichium along with either 56 other wooers (according to Apollodorus), or 51 (according to Homer). Demoptolemus, with the other suitors, met his end by the spear of Odysseus in the final stages of the battle in the hall of the latter's palace.

== See also ==
- List of mortals in Greek mythology
- Suitors of Penelope
