= Melantho (Odyssey) =

Character in Greek mythology

Andrea Saric as Melantho in the 1968 series Odissea (dal Poema di Omero)

17th-century engraving by Theodoor van Thulden: After massacring the suitors, Ulysses summons the disloyal slave maids and condemns them to death; Melantho was probably one of them.

In Greek mythology, Melantho (/mɪˈlænθoʊ/; Ancient Greek: Μελανθώ, romanized: Melanthṓ, IPA: [me.lan.tʰɔ̌ː]) is one of the minor characters in the Odyssey. She was one of the maidservants of Odysseus who was loyal to the suitors of Penelope.

== Family ==
Melantho was the sister of Melanthios, a goatherd in Ithaca, and the daughter of Dolios.

== Mythology ==
Melantho was among Penelope's favourite handmaidens; she had "reared and looked after her as tenderly as her own child" and given "all the toys she could desire" growing up.

Melantho was disloyal to Odysseus and his household. She was one of the slaves who slept with the suitors of Penelope; she was in love with Eurymachus and had become his mistress.

Melantho is described as having a "sharp tongue". Upon Odysseus's arrival in his own home, disguised as a beggar, Melantho treats him harshly and rudely - asking why he has not gone to sleep in the smithy, the location where chance visitors in Ithaca tended to go, and warning him that a better man that Arnaeus might soon kill him in combat. Odysseus threatens to tell Telemachus what she has said, and tells Melantho that Telemachus would chop her into pieces. This scares the maidservants, making their limbs go slack and prompting them to run away. She is rude to Odysseus again, urging him to leave, for which Odysseus and Penelope respond intensely to her.

After Odysseus and his men kill the suitors, it is not clear if Melantho is among the 12 slave girls forced to clean the hall and hanged by Telemachus.

== In other media ==
- Melantho is a character in the opera Il ritorno d'Ulisse in patria
- Melantho is portrayed by Teresa Pellati in the 1954 film Ulysses
- Melantho is portrayed by Andrea Saric in the 1968 series Odissea (dal Poema di Omero)
- Melantho is portrayed by Mia Goth in the 2026 film The Odyssey.

== Sources ==
- Homer, The Odyssey with an English Translation by A.T. Murray, PH.D. in two volumes. Cambridge, MA., Harvard University Press; London, William Heinemann, Ltd. 1919. ISBN 978-0674995611. Online version at the Perseus Digital Library. Greek text available from the same website.
- Homer, The Odyssey with an English Translation by E.V. Rieu and D.C.H. Rieu. Penguin Books 2003.
- Pausanias, Description of Greece with an English Translation by W.H.S. Jones, Litt.D., and H.A. Ormerod, M.A., in 4 Volumes. Cambridge, MA, Harvard University Press; London, William Heinemann Ltd. 1918. ISBN 0-674-99328-4. Online version at the Perseus Digital Library
- Pausanias, Graeciae Descriptio. 3 vols. Leipzig, Teubner. 1903. Greek text available at the Perseus Digital Library.
