= Leiocritus =

Leiocritus (Ancient Greek: Λειώκριτος) or Leocritus (Λεώκριτός) was the name of three characters in Greek mythology:

- Leocritus, the Trojan son of Polydamas. He participated in the Trojan War and was killed by Odysseus.
- Leiocritus, son of Arisbas and an Achaean warrior who was killed by Aeneas during the siege of Troy.
- Leiocritus, son of the Evenor and one of the Suitors of Penelope who came from Zacynthus along with other 43 wooers. He was slain by Telemachus.
