= Arnaeus =

Greek mythological figure

Illustration by Willy Pogany of Odysseus fighting Irus from The Adventures of Odysseus and The Tales of Troy by Padraic Colum

Arnaeus (/ɑːrˈniːʌs/; Ancient Greek: Ἀρναῖος, romanized: Arnaîos) is a character in Greek mythology.

== Mythology ==
Arnaeus, or Irus, as he is referred to for his connection as a messenger to the deity Iris, is a character in Homer's Odyssey. He is a beggar in Ithaca who is willing to run messages for the suitors of Penelope.

He encounters Odysseus, disguised as a beggar, in Book 18 of the Odyssey. He insults him, perceiving him to be a threat as another beggar, and Odysseus rebukes him. They argue back and forth until the suitor Antinous notices the confrontation and declares that the winner of their fight will be given food and permission to sit with the suitors.

Odysseus removed his rags and tied them around his waist, revealing a surprisingly muscular body because Athena was standing close by making him appear bigger and stronger than he was. When Irus saw this he was intimidated; Antinous told him that should he lose, he would be sent to King Echetus, "the maimer of all men", who would cut off Irus's nose and ears and feed his vitals to the dogs. The suitors pushed Irus towards Odysseus, who entertained the idea of killing Irus, but decided he should just knock him out so the suitors would not suspect anything (it is not disclosed whether Antinous follows through with this threat after Irus's defeat, although the audience, congratulating Odysseus on his victory, say "soon shall we take him to the mainland to King Echetus"). Irus aimed a punch at Odysseus but before he could do anything, Odysseus hit him below the ear, crushing his jawbone. Irus crumpled and Odysseus dragged him outside the hall, leaned him up against the courtyard wall and told him to sit there and scare off the pigs and dogs. He also threatened that if Irus did not stop pushing around the other beggars, things would get worse. Irus's appearance within the epic develops the Homeric themes of punishing the inhospitable and appearances versus reality.
