= Eurymachus (Odyssey) =

Character in Homer's Odyssey, son of Polybus

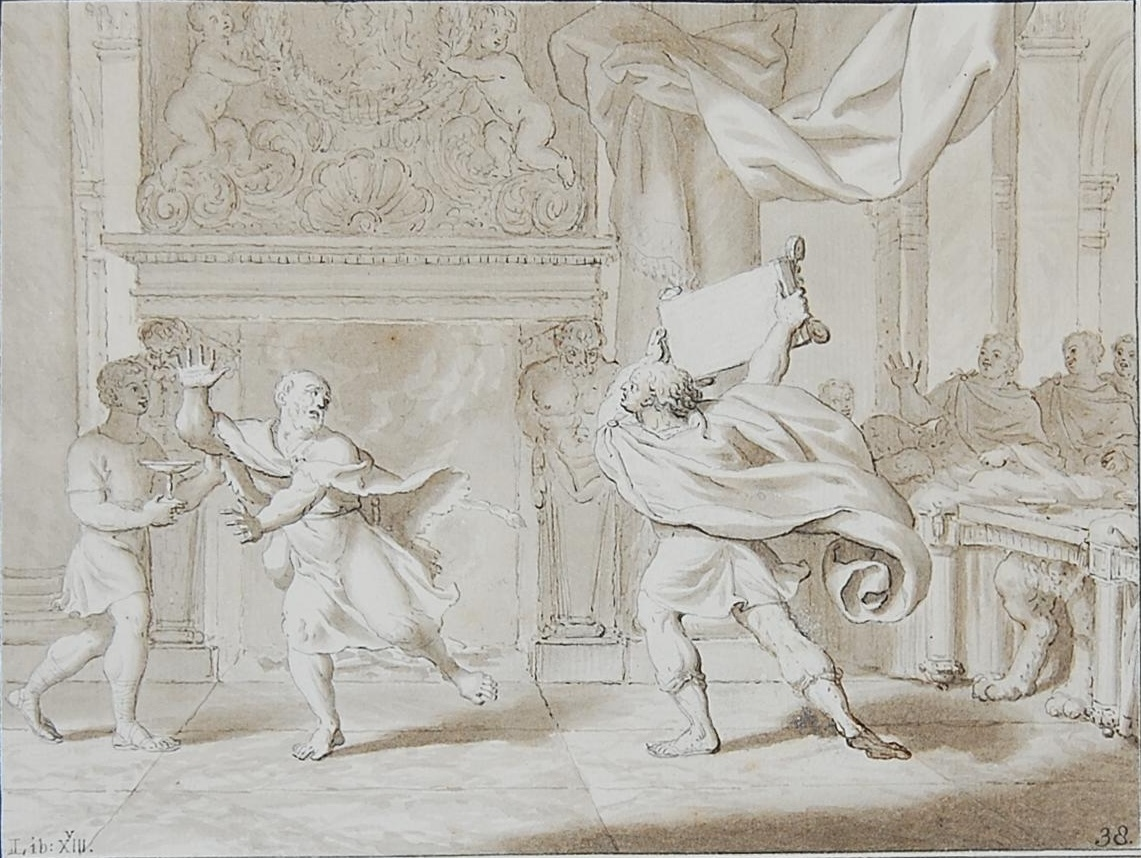
Drawing of Eurymachus throwing a footstool at Odysseus by Tako Hajo Jelgersma

In Greek mythology, Eurymachus (/jʊˈrɪməkəs/; Ancient Greek: Εὐρύμαχος Eurúmakhos) was an Ithacan nobleman and one of the two leading suitors of Penelope, the other being Antinous.

== Family ==
Eurymachus was the son of Polybus, also a suitor of Penelope.

== Mythology ==
In Homer’s Odyssey, Eurymachus, along with the majority of his fellow suitors, shows no regard for the Greek custom of xenia or guest-friend hospitality; he is arrogant, disrespectful, and consumes food and drink without the slightest reciprocation. Eurymachus is noteworthy for being manipulative and deceitful, at one point even fooling Penelope into thinking him without ill-intent. Although he arranges for the death of Odysseus’ son, Telemachus, his plan fails and he is later killed by Odysseus. He claims in his childhood Odysseus befriended him often, and tells Penelope that makes Telemachus 'my dearest friend on Earth' and he will protect him, though 'death for Telemachus was in his heart'. After Antinous of Ithaca is shot, Eurymachus appeals to Odysseus, blaming Antinous for all the trouble that had been caused and saying what the suitors took will be repaid. Odysseus, however, maintains that killing will continue until he has satiated his taste for vengeance, whereupon Eurymachus runs at Odysseus with his sword, but Odysseus shoots an arrow into Eurymachus’ chest, stopping him dead.

Penelope's maid, Melantho, is his lover.
