= Arisbas =

In Greek mythology, the name Arisbas (Ancient Greek: Ἀρίσβας, romanized: Arísbas) may refer to:

- Arisbas, father of Molurus.
- Arisbas, father of the Achaean warrior Leiocritus who was killed by Aeneas in the Trojan War.
