= Mesaulius =

Character in Homer's Odyssey

In Homer's Odyssey, Mesaulius (Ancient Greek: Μεσαύλιος) is the servant of Eumaeus (Odysseus's swineheard), who purchases him during his own master's long absence from Ithaca during and in the aftermath of the Trojan War. Mesaulius was acquired from the Taphians with Eumaeus's own ostensibly meagre resources and served as a waiter during Odysseus's first supper back home, in Eumaeus's hut, with its owner and his fellow drovers.
