= Molurus =

In Greek mythology, Molurus (Ancient Greek: Μόλουρος Molouros) was the son of Arisbas. In a surviving fragment of the poem Megalai Ehoiai, Molurus was killed by Hyettus of Argos when Hyettus caught him with his wife.
