= Suitors of Penelope =

Group of characters from Homer's Odyssey

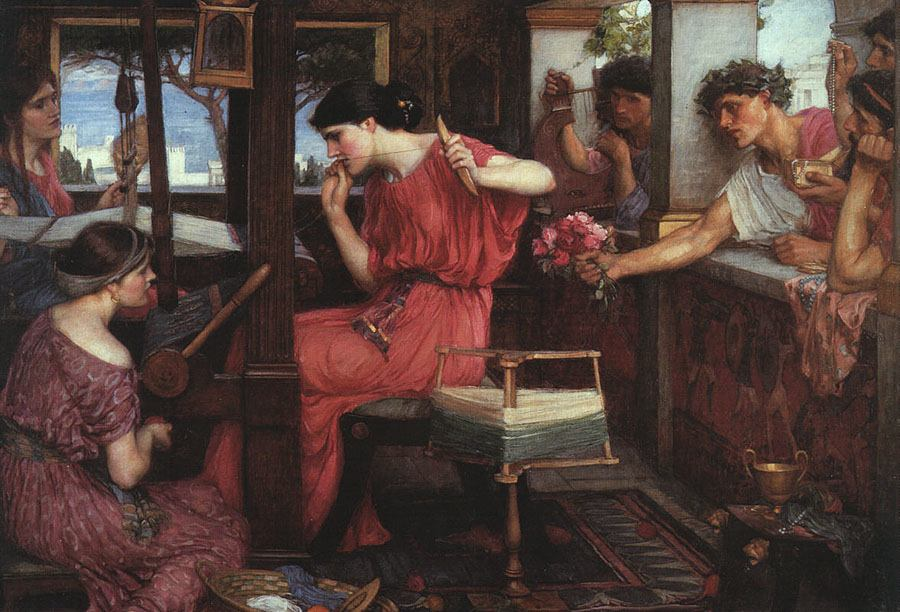
Penelope and the Suitors by John William Waterhouse (1912).

In Greek mythology, the suitors of Penelope (Ancient Greek: οἱ μνηστῆρες, romanized: hoi mnēstēres; Latin: Proci) are one of the main subjects of Homer's Odyssey.

== Role in the Odyssey ==
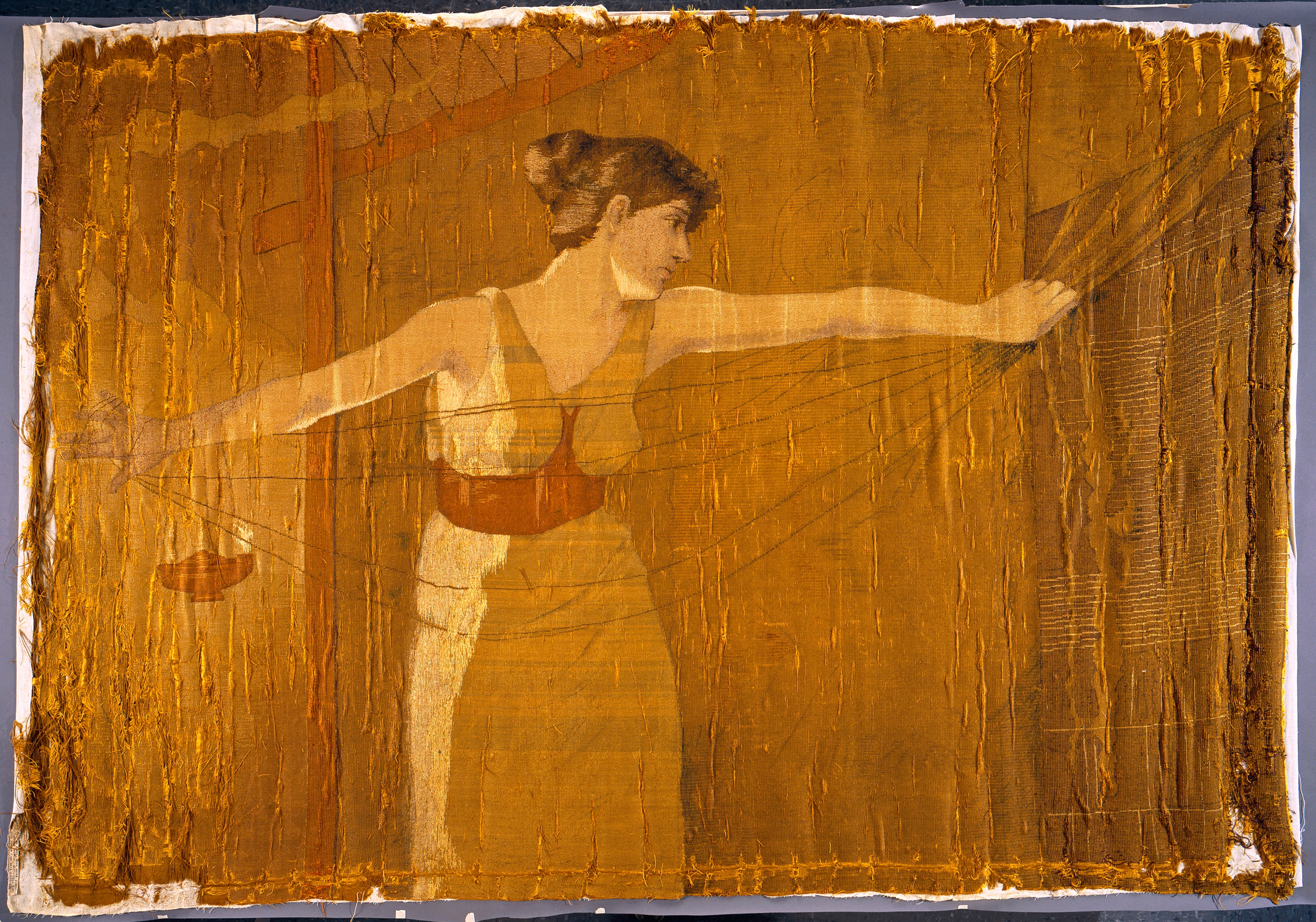
Penelope Unraveling Her Work at Night by Dora Wheeler Keith (1886)

In the Odyssey, Homer describes Odysseus' journey home from Troy. Prior to the Trojan War, Odysseus was King of Ithaca, a Greek island known for its isolation and rugged terrain. When he departs from Ithaca to fight for the Greeks in the war, he leaves behind a newborn child, Telemachus, and his wife, Penelope. Although most surviving Greek soldiers return shortly after the end of the fighting, Odysseus does not return to Ithaca until ten years after the end of the Trojan War.

During Odysseus' long absence, unmarried young men start to suspect that Odysseus died in Troy or on the journey home. Under the pretense of courting Penelope, these youths, called "the suitors", take up residence in Odysseus' home and vie for her hand in marriage. Rather than simply rejecting the suitors, Penelope devises a plan to delay their courtship. She claims she will choose a husband after she has finished weaving a funeral shroud to present to Odysseus' father, Laertes. For three years, Penelope weaves the shroud during the day and unravels it at night, awaiting her husband's return. The suitors learn of Penelope's delaying tactic when one of her maidservants, Melantho, reveals it to her lover Eurymachus. Upon finding out, the suitors demand that she choose a husband from among them.

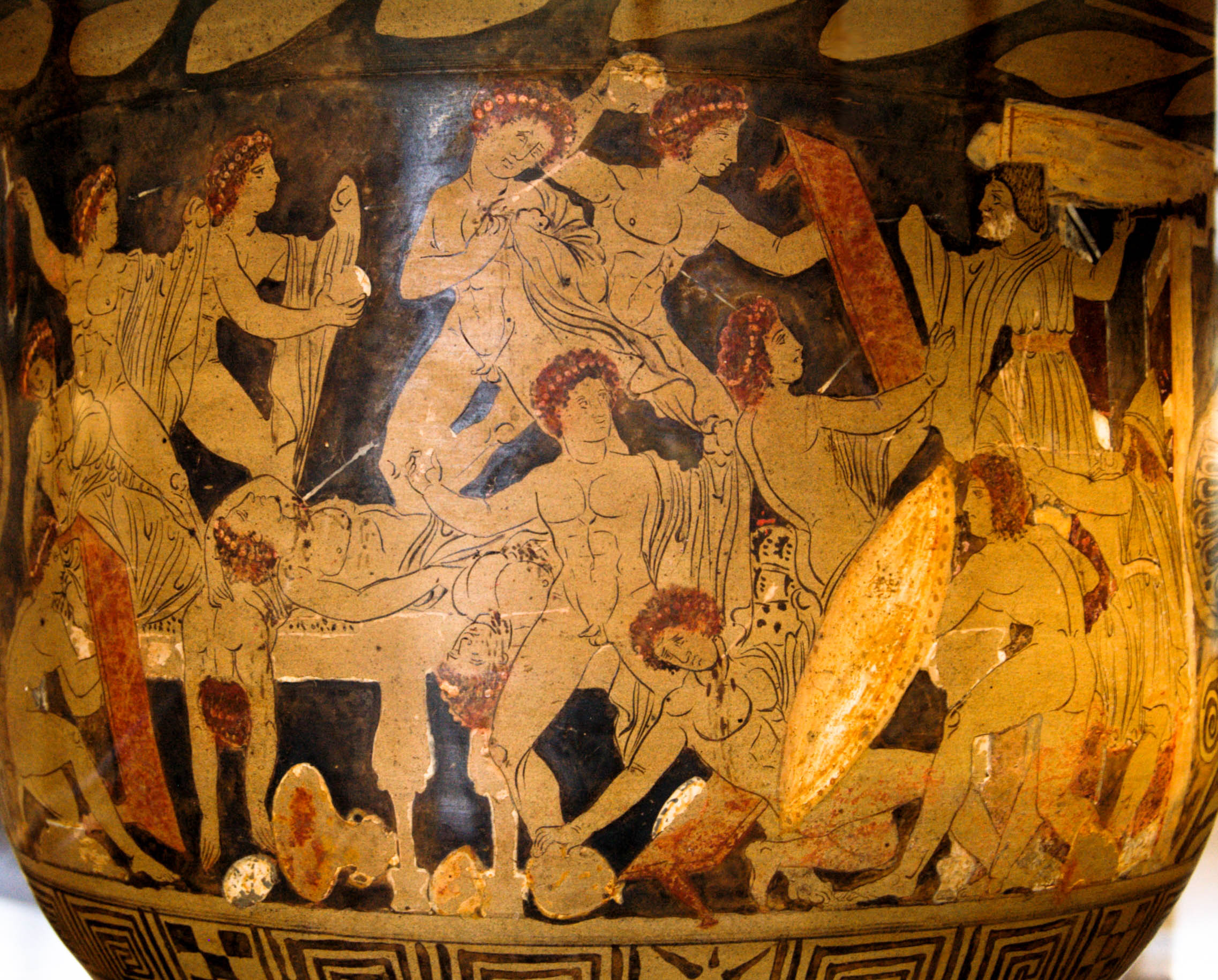
Slaughter of the suitors by Odysseus and Telemachus, Campanian red-figure bell-krater, c. 330 BC, Louvre (CA 7124)

The suitors behave badly in Odysseus' home, drinking his wine and eating his food. Odysseus' son, Telemachus, now a young man, is frustrated with the suitors. Telemachus laments to Athena (disguised as Mentes, one of Odysseus' guest-friends) about the suitors' behavior. In return, Athena urges Telemachus to stand up to the suitors and set out in search of his father.

Once Odysseus returns home (after Athena initially disguises him as a beggar so he can plot his revenge in secret), his son Telemachus tells him that there are 108 suitors: 52 from Dulichium, 24 from Same, 20 Achaeans from Zacynthus, and 12 from Ithaca. Together, Odysseus, Telemachus, Eumaeus and Philoetius kill the suitors and the disloyal maidservants. For reasons of oral presentation (i.e., a memory aid), the suitors are usually listed in the same order throughout the Odyssey.

== Important suitors ==
Although there are many suitors, three are particularly important to the narrative of the Odyssey.

=== Antinous ===
Antinous, son of Eupheithes, is the first of the suitors to speak in the epic and the first to die upon Odysseus' return. Antinous is the most disrespectful of the suitors and is the one who devises a plan to murder Telemachus upon his return to Ithaca. Although his plan is vetoed by Amphinomus, Antinous continues to behave arrogantly. He encourages the fight between beggar-Odysseus and the beggar Irus. When Odysseus finally returns home, disguised as a beggar, Antinous does not show him hospitality, throwing a stool at beggar Odysseus.

=== Eurymachus ===
Eurymachus, son of Polybus, is the second of the suitors to appear in the epic. Eurymachus acts as a leader among the suitors because of his charisma. He is noted to be the most likely to win Penelope's hand because her father and brothers support the union and because he outdoes the other suitors in gift-giving. Although he is charismatic, Eurymachus is deceitful. He discovers Penelope's plot because he is having an affair with one of Penelope's maidservants, Melantho. Eurymachus also throws a stool at Odysseus. Further, when Odysseus reveals himself to the suitors, Eurymachus attempts to avoid punishment for the suitors' misdeeds by blaming them all on Antinous.

=== Amphinomus ===
Amphinomus, son of King Nisos, is the most sympathetic of the suitors. Amphinomus attempts twice to dissuade the suitors from murdering Telemachus. Odysseus recognizes this and attempts to warn Amphinomus to leave the home before the final battle. Despite this, Amphinomus is induced by Athena to stay and then dies along with the other suitors.

== List of suitors ==
=== Appearing in the Odyssey ===
While most of the suitors are not dealt with individually by Homer, some are mentioned by name and play more or less significant roles in the poem. Among them are:

- Agelaus, son of Damastor. Killed by Odysseus.
- Amphimedon, son of Melaneus. Killed by Telemachus. Later recounts his death to Agamemnon and Achilles while in the underworld and blames Penelope for it.
- Amphinomus. Shows courtesy towards the disguised Odysseus, who warns him against staying; the warning goes unheeded, though, and he is killed along with the other suitors, though by Telemachus and not Odysseus.
- Antinous, son of Eupeithes. One of the leaders of the suitors and the first to be killed by Odysseus, he helps instigate the plot to kill Telemachus as he returns from the mainland, and helps spur the fight between Odysseus (as the beggar) and Irus, a notorious beggar.
- Ctesippus of Same, son of Polytherses. A "ribald fellow" of great wealth who gives Odysseus, disguised as a beggar, a "present" by throwing a heifer's foot at him; Telemachus threatens him in response, and says that he would have killed him if he had not missed. He is slain by Odysseus' loyal cowherd Philoetius.
- Demoptolemus, killed by Odysseus.
- Elatus, killed by Odysseus' loyal swineherd Eumaeus.
- Euryades, killed by Telemachus.
- Eurydamas. Offered a pair of earrings as a gift to Penelope. Eventually killed by Odysseus.
- Eurymachus, son of Polybus. One of the leaders of the suitors, noted for being smooth and deceitful. He blames everything on Antinous after the latter is killed by Odysseus, saying that the suitors are sorry for what they have done and will repay Odysseus. His pleas do not persuade Odysseus, so he tells the suitors they will have to fight if they wish to live, and he is shot with an arrow while charging Odysseus.
- Eurynomus, son of Aegyptius. His brother Antiphus accompanied Odysseus to the Trojan War and was devoured by Polyphemus on the way back.
- Leiocritus, son of Evenor. Killed by Telemachus.
- Leodes, son of Oenops. The sacrificial priest to the suitors, he hates the evil deeds of the suitors and is indignant with the others. While Odysseus is killing the suitors, he begs for mercy, saying that he tried to stop the others and they were paying for not listening to him. Odysseus hears him out, but says that, as a priest, he must have prayed for Odysseus to not come home, so he kills him anyway.
- Peisander, son of Polyctor. Offered a necklace as a gift to Penelope. Killed by Philoetius.
- Polybus, son of Polyctor and father of Eurymachus.

=== Appearing in the Bibliotheca ===
An extensive list of Penelope's suitors is given in the Bibliotheca. This source does not appear to fully respect the Homeric tradition, as the numbers are different and not all of those named in the Odyssey appear in the Bibliotheca. Due to the text being damaged, some of the names are repeated several times and the lists for Dulichium and Zacynthus actually contain fewer names than the given figures suggest.

57 suitors from Dulichium

1. Amphinomus
2. Thoas
3. Demoptolemus
4. Amphimachus
5. Euryalus
6. Paralus
7. Evenorides
8. Clytius
9. Agenor
10. Eurypylus
11. Pylaemenes
12. Acamas
13. Thersilochus
14. Hagius
15. Clymenus
16. Philodemus
17. Meneptolemus
18. Damastor
19. Bias
20. Telmius
21. Polyidus
22. Astylochus
23. Schedius
24. Antigonus
25. Marpsius
26. Iphidamas
27. Argius
28. Glaucus
29. Calydoneus
30. Echion
31. Lamas
32. Andraemon
33. Agerochus
34. Medon
35. Agrius
36. Promus
37. Ctesius
38. Acarnan
39. Cycnus
40. Pseras
41. Hellanicus
42. Periphron
43. Megasthenes
44. Thrasymedes
45. Ormenius
46. Diopithes
47. Mecisteus
48. Antimachus
49. Ptolemaeus
50. Lestorides
51. Nicomachus
52. Polypoetes
53. Ceraus

23 from Same

1. Agelaus
2. Peisander
3. Elatus
4. Ctesippus
5. Hippodochus
6. Eurystratus
7. Archemolus
8. Ithacus
9. Peisenor
10. Hyperenor
11. Pheroetes
12. Antisthenes
13. Cerberus
14. Perimedes
15. Cynnus
16. Thriasus
17. Eteoneus
18. Clytius
19. Prothous
20. Lycaethus
21. Eumelus
22. Itanus
23. Lyammus

44 from Zacynthus

1. Eurymachus
2. Laomedes
3. Molebus
4. Phrenius
5. Indius
6. Minis
7. Leiocritus
8. Pronomus
9. Nisas
10. Daemon
11. Archestratus
12. Hippomachus
13. Euryalus
14. Periallus
15. Evenorides
16. Clytius
17. Agenor
18. Polybus
19. Polydorus
20. Thadytius
21. Stratius
22. Phrenius
23. Indius
24. Daesenor
25. Laomedon
26. Laodicus
27. Halius
28. Magnes
29. Oloetrochus
30. Barthas
31. Theophron
32. Nissaeus
33. Alcarops
34. Periclymenus
35. Antenor
36. Pellas
37. Celtus
38. Periphas
39. Ormenus
40. Polybus
41. Andromedes

12 from Ithaca

1. Antinous
2. Pronous
3. Leiodes
4. Eurynomus
5. Amphimachus
6. Amphialus
7. Promachus
8. Amphimedon
9. Aristratus
10. Helenus
11. Dulicheus
12. Ctesippus
