= Antinous of Ithaca =

Greek mythical character

Drawing of Odysseus killing Antinous by Tako Hajo Jelgersma

In the Epic Cycle and Homer's The Odyssey, Antinous (also Antinoüs; Latin: Antinous) or Antinoös (Ancient Greek: Ἀντίνοος, romanized: Antínoös) was the Ithacan son of Eupeithes.

== Mythology ==
Illustration of Odysseus making himself known by shooting Antinous with an arrow while he is drinking by Theodoor van Thulden, Niccolò dell'Abbate and Francesco Primaticcio

One of three prominent suitors of Penelope vying for her hand in marriage, the others being Eurymachus and Amphinomus, Antinous was presented as a violent, mean-spirited, and over-confident character who wilfully defiles Odysseus' home while the hero is lost at sea. In an attempt to kill Telemachus, the son of Odysseus and Penelope, Antinous sends out a small band of suitors in the strait between Ithaca and rugged Same where there is a rocky isle called Asteris, to intercept the young prince on his journey back to Ithaca from the hall of Menelaus. The plan, however, fails, as Telemachus avoids the trap with help from the goddess Athena.

Antinous is a prime example of disregard for the custom of xenia (guest-friend hospitality); rather than reciprocating food and drink with stories and respect, he and his fellow suitors simply devour Odysseus' livestock. He also shows no respect for the lower-classed citizenry, as is exemplified when he assaults a beggar, who is actually Odysseus in disguise, with a chair, at which even the other suitors disapprove. Antinous is the first of the suitors to be killed. Drinking in the Great Hall, he is slain by an arrow to the throat shot by Odysseus. Eurymachus then tries to blame Antinous for the suitors' wrongs.

In one account, Penelope was seduced by Antinous and was sent away by Odysseus to her father Icarius.

== In other media ==
Oscar Asche as Antinous in Stephen Phillips' 1902 play Ulysses

Constantin Nepo as Antinous in the 1968 miniseries Odissea (dal Poema di Omero)

The character has been portrayed by the following actors:

- Anthony Quinn in the 1954 film Ulysses
- Constantin Nepo in the 1968 miniseries Odissea (dal Poema di Omero)
- Vincenzo Nicoli in the 1997 miniseries The Odyssey
- Marwan Kenzari in the 2024 film The Return
- Robert Pattinson in 2026 film The Odyssey
