= Penelope =

Wife of Odysseus in Greek mythology

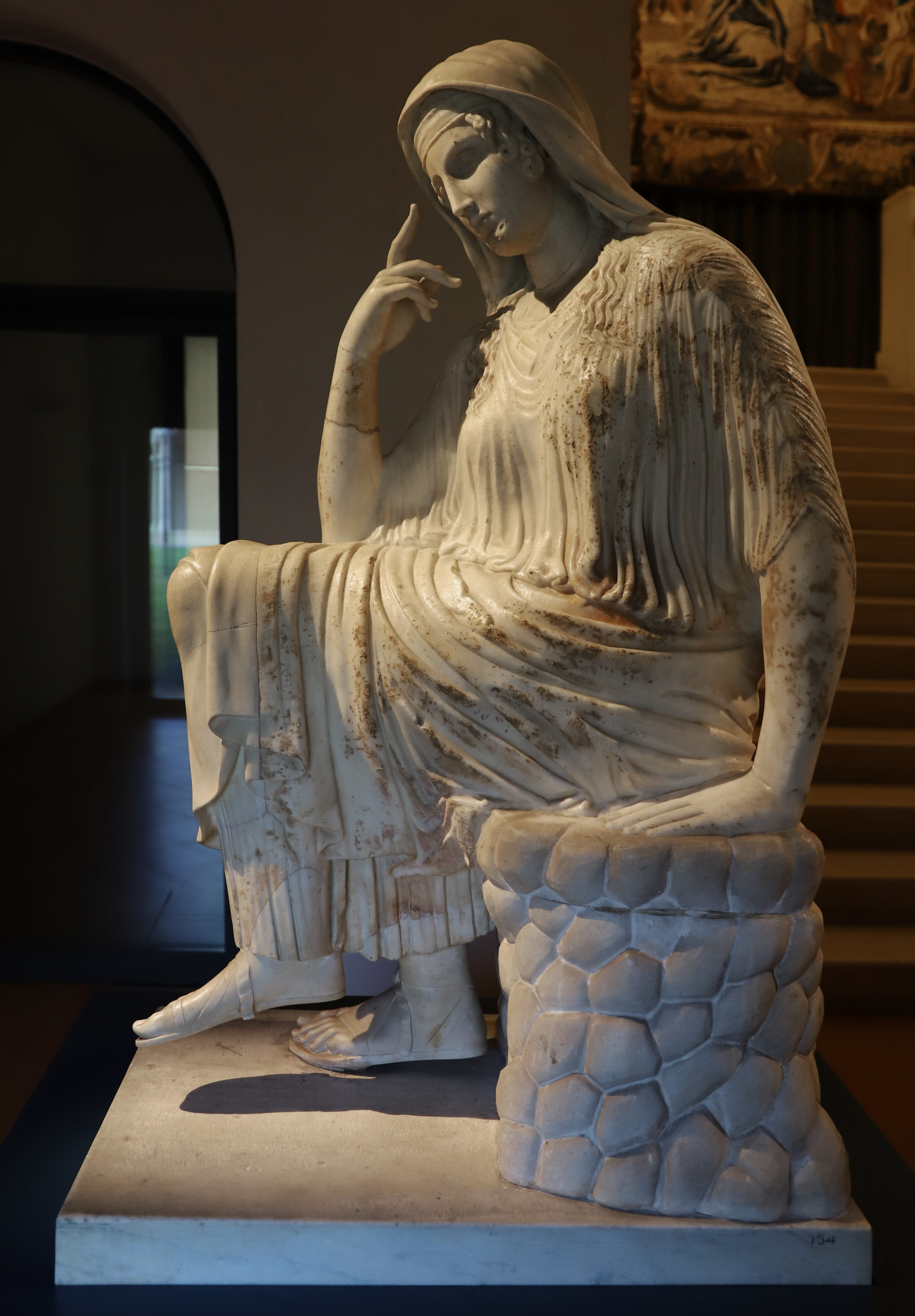
Sitting Penelope, 1st-century Roman copy of a 5th-century BC Greek original, Vatican Museums.

Penelope (/pəˈnɛləpi/ pə-NEL-ə-pee; Ancient Greek: Πηνελόπη, IPA: [pɛː.ne.ló.pɛː]) is the legendary wife of Odysseus and queen of Ithaca in Homer's Odyssey. She is the daughter of Spartan king Icarius, and the mother of Telemachus. Different sources describe her as the mother of figures such as Poliporthes, Arcesilaus, Italus, Mamilia, and the god Pan.

The mythological Penelope is known for her fidelity to her husband Odysseus, despite the attention of more than a hundred suitors during his absence, alongside her great intelligence in weaving a multitude of schemes to keep her suitors at bay. In one source, Penelope's original name was Ameirake, Arnakia, or Arnaia. She was considered exceptional in both beauty and wits. She was virtuous and it was said that she surpassed her cousin Helen in the beauty of her virtue.

== Etymology ==
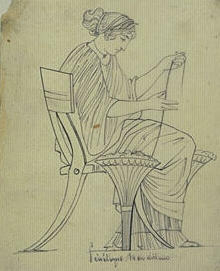
Penelope. Drawing after Attic pottery figure.

Glossed by Hesychius as "some kind of bird" (today arbitrarily identified with the Eurasian wigeon, to which Linnaeus gave the binomial Anas penelope), where -elōps (-έλωψ) is a common Pre-Greek suffix for predatory animals; However, the semantic relation between the proper name and the gloss is not clear. In folk etymology, Pēnelopē (Πηνελόπη) is usually understood to combine the Greek word pēnē (πήνη), "weft", and ōps (ὤψ), "face", which is considered the most appropriate for a cunning weaver whose motivation is hard to decipher. Robert S. P. Beekes believed the name to be Pre-Greek and related to pēnelops (πηνέλοψ) or pēnelōps (πηνέλωψ). Olga Levaniouk argued that the pēnelops were not wigeons, but rather a kind of seabird not too dissimilar to the Halcyon.

== Genealogy ==
According to the Odyssey, Penelope is the daughter of Laconian Icarius, King of Lacedaemon or Acarnania. Little else is mentioned about Penelope's familial background in the Homeric epics. However, Pseudo-Apollodorus says she is the daughter of the Naiad Periboea (who is said to have had five other sons with Icarius, but not Iphthime from the Odyssey). Strabo in his Geography says Penelope's mother is Polycaste, the daughter of Lygaeus. Aside from the above-mentioned, the scholia to the Odyssey give the names of a Asterodea and Dorodoche.

== Mythology ==
=== Before the Trojan War ===
==== Pēnelopes and Plunge into the Sea ====
Pseudo-Apollodorus, Pausanias, Strabo and other ancient authors describe Penelope's life prior to the Trojan War. There are at least two separate myths that chronicle her being plunged into the seas only to be rescued by the pēnelopes bird, as attested by the Byzantine scholar Eustathius of Thessalonica alongside various scholia. In the first, Penelope as a child is cast into the sea by her parents and rescued by the pēnelopes birds. Once recovered, she is taken back by her parents, whose strange actions are given no reasoning or justification.

It is said that she was first called Arnaia and was thrown into the sea by her parents, and then carried to shore by some birds called pēnelopes. And in this way she was recovered by her parents and named Penelope, by the same name as the birds, and when she grew up she had two names for the rest of her life.

Despite the above, the Odyssey portrays Icarius as having given his daughter a dowry with "very numerous" gifts, befitting a beloved child. One that his grandson Telemachus would find difficult to compensate should he wish to return Penelope to her father's house. Telemachus himself goes on to proclaim that Icarius will make him pay a hefty "price" should he attempt to send his mother back to her father's house.

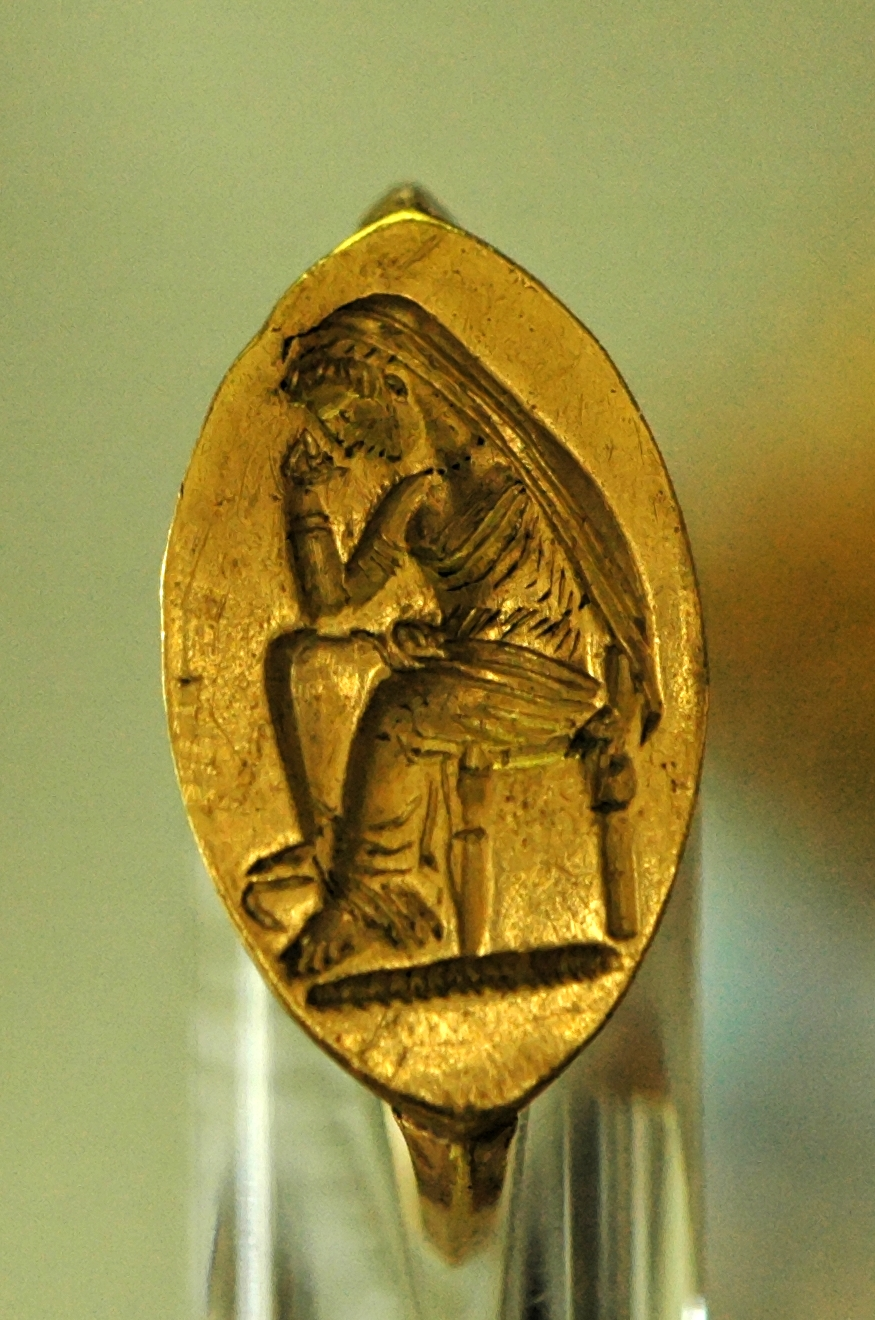
Gold intaglio ring depicting Penelope, Syria, last quarter of the 5th century BC (Louvre Museum)

The second version of events transpires when Penelope is a married woman, during the time of the Trojan War at the hands of King Nauplius of Euboea. Nauplius desired retaliation against Odysseus for having conspired to have his son Palamedes killed. At the beginning of the Trojan War, King Menelaus called upon the former suitors of his wife Queen Helen of Troy to keep faith with their oath, and assist him in retrieving Helen back from Troy, where she had fled with or had been abducted by Prince Paris. Upon hearing this, Odysseus feigned lunacy by pretending to yoke a bull and donkey together and plough his fields, to avoid the prospect of war, for his wife Penelope had only recently given birth to his son, and it had been prophesied that should Odysseus depart Ithaca and set sail for Troy, he would not return home for twenty years and would suffer greatly at sea.

Palamedes had seen through this scheme, however, and foiled it. He snatched Penelope and Odysseus' newborn son from her breast, and either placed him in front of Odysseus' plough or drew his sword forth as if to kill the infant. Fear for the life of his child made Odysseus give up on his act , thereby proving that he was of sound mind and forcing him to keep the oath of Tyndareus by going to war against Troy with the Achaeans. Though Odysseus was forced to go to Troy, he never forgave Palamedes for forcing him into the war, and killed the son of Nauplius years later. It was for this that Nauplius sought to kill Penelope by throwing her into the sea. Once again, she is saved by the pēnelopes.

Didymos says that Penelope was first called Amirake/Ameirake or Arnakia, but when Nauplius threw her into the sea to exact vengeance for his son Palamedes, she was saved by pēnelopes, the nominative singular of which is pēnelops, and accordingly she was renamed in this way.

While factors vary between the two, both myths consistently hold that Penelope's name is derived from the pēnelopes and that she holds a special relationship with the birds. Classicist Olga Levaniouk suggests that the myths of Penelope and her pēnelopes show her intrinsic connection to the cyclic sequence of darkness, disappearance, and lament, followed by light, return, and rebirth.

==== Marriage to Odysseus ====
When Helen, daughter of Zeus, came of age to marry, she was sought after by princes and kings from across the world, all converging on Sparta at the court of her adoptive father, Tyndareus. Among the suitors was Odysseus, son of Laertes, who hailed from the island kingdom of Ithaca. Odysseus neither sent nor brought bridal gifts for Helen, believing the match already effectively decided in favour of Menelaus, son of Atreus, who had already courted Helen's brothers, Castor and Pollux, on the matter.

The crowd of suitors placed Tyndareus in a difficult position, since whichever man was chosen as Helen's husband, risked provoking the resentment and retaliation of those rejected, endangering himself, his daughter, her prospective groom, and the rest of his family. Recognizing an opportunity, Odysseus, who now wished to marry Tyndareus' niece, approached him with a bargain: he would provide a solution to the conundrum at hand if Tyndareus would in return support his own suit for the hand of Penelope, and taking her as his wife.

Tyndareus accepted the offer. Odysseus's solution was this: before a husband for Helen was chosen, all suitors would be made to swear a binding oath. Under its terms, once Helen's husband was named, none of the rejected suitors would interfere in the marriage. Should any man ever attempt to abduct Helen from her chosen husband, all the other suitors would be obligated to unite and take action against the offender to see justice done. Eager to secure their chances with Helen, the suitors agreed to swear the oath as Tyndareus proposed it. Odysseus too swore the oath to secure his marriage with Penelope.

With the oath secured, Tyndareus was free to permit Helen to choose her husband, or choose Menelaus as Helen's husband himself without fear of reprisal from the other suitors. In turn, honouring his side of the bargain, after Helen was duly married to Menelaus, Tyndareus persuaded his brother Icarius, Penelope's father, to give her hand in marriage to Odysseus.

The oath of Helen's suitors would later prove consequential. Years later, when Helen was abducted by or ran away with Prince Paris of Troy, the suitors' vow became the basis for the coalition of Achaean kings who launched the Trojan War.

Now Icarius, however, was not especially keen on Odysseus as a suitor for Penelope. Well after Helen's marriage had been settled, he held a challenge at Lacedaemon for all of Penelope's wooers who sought her hand, setting forth a foot-race with Penelope's marriage as the prize for the victor. The course on which the race was run would afterward be named the Aphetaid Road, in commemoration of the race that had commenced there.

Odysseus won the foot-race, besting all his rivals and so winning his famed wife, leaving Icarius with no choice but to accept the marriage. In celebration of his victory, at having won Penelope's hand and defeated her other suitors, Odysseus built three sanctuaries to Athena near the Aphetaid Road, each set some distance from the others. He named the goddess there Keleuthea, meaning "Lady of the Road".

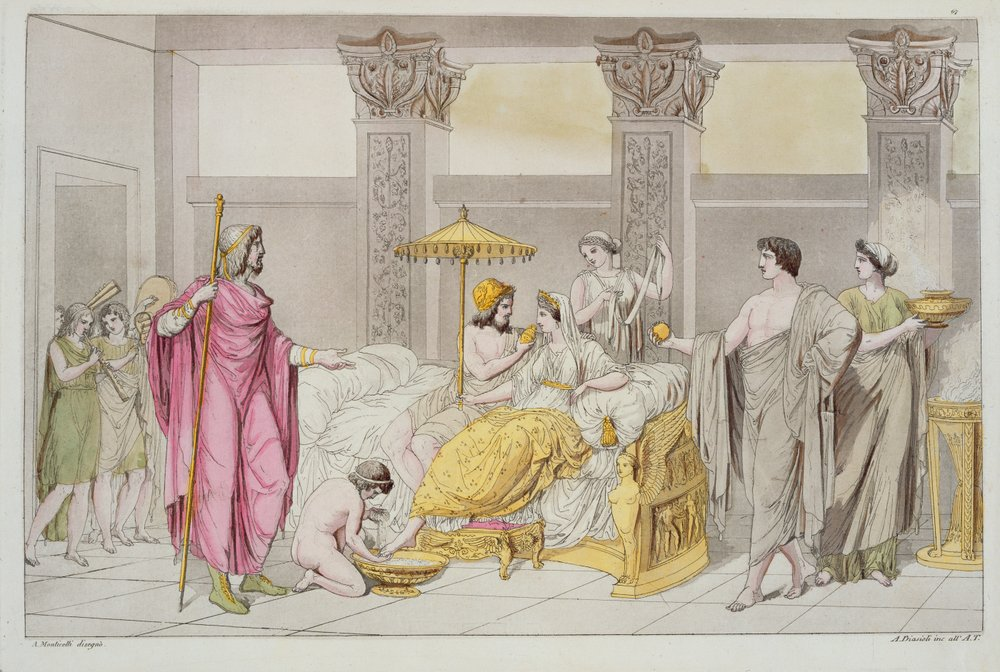
illustration from Le Costume Ancien ou Moderne by Giulio Ferrario, engraved by A. Biasoli.

After giving Penelope to Odysseus in marriage, Icarius attempted to persuade Odysseus to remain and settle in Lacedaemon, offering Odysseus his own kingdom. Odysseus refused the offer, which was attributed to him being his father's only heir. Having failed in this, Icarius then turned to Penelope instead, begging her to stay. Even as she departed for Ithaca, he followed the couple's chariot, pleading with her to remain behind in her father's house.

Odysseus endured this for some time, before at last telling Penelope to choose between the two of them: to accompany him to Ithaca as his wife of her own free will, or to return to her father and his home in Lacedaemon. Penelope made no verbal reply, instead drawing her veil across her face in answer to the question. Understanding by this that his daughter wished to depart with her husband, Icarius let her go at last.

In honour of Penelope, Icarius built a statue of Aidos (Modesty) at the very spot on the road, for it was where she had veiled herself.

=== Role in the Odyssey ===
Penelope is married to the main character, the King of Ithaca, Odysseus (Ulysses in Roman mythology), and daughter of Icarius of Sparta. She has only one son with Odysseus, Telemachus, who was born just before Odysseus was called to fight in the Trojan War. She waits twenty years for Odysseus's return, during which time she devises strategies to delay marrying any of the 108 suitors (led by Antinous and including Agelaus, Amphinomus, Ctessippus, Demoptolemus, Elatus, Euryades, Eurymachus and Peisander). (Note: Odysseus spends ten years in the Trojan War, and ten years travelling home.)

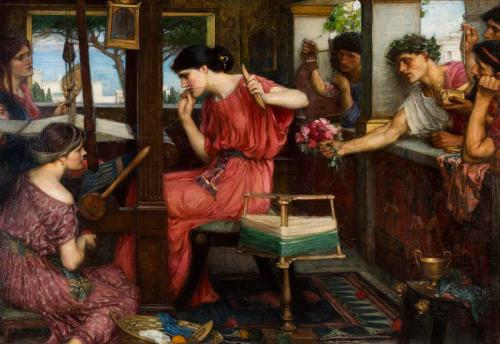
Penelope and the Suitors by John William Waterhouse (1911–1912)

On Odysseus's return, disguised as an old beggar, he finds that Penelope has remained faithful. She has devised cunning tricks to delay the suitors, one of which is to pretend to be weaving a burial shroud for Odysseus's elderly father Laertes and claiming that she will choose a suitor when she has finished. Every night for three years, she undoes part of the shroud, until Melantho, a slave, discovers her subterfuge and reveals it to the suitors.

Penelope's efforts to delay remarriage are often seen as a symbol of marital fidelity to her husband, Odysseus. But because Athena wants her "to show herself to the wooers, that she might set their hearts a-flutter and win greater honor from her husband and her son than heretofore", Penelope does eventually appear before the suitors.

Irene de Jong wrote:

As so often, it is Athena who takes the initiative in giving the story a new direction ... Usually the motives of mortal and god coincide, here they do not: Athena wants Penelope to fan the Suitors' desire for her and (thereby) make her more esteemed by her husband and son; Penelope has no real motive ... she simply feels an unprecedented impulse to meet the men she so loathes ... adding that she might take this opportunity to talk to Telemachus (which she will indeed do).

Italian philosophy historian Giulia Sissa offers the perspective that Penelope entertained or even enjoyed the attention of her suitors. Sissa discusses how Penelope gives her suitors the opportunity to demonstrate themselves as the best candidate for her attention:

Penelope innovates. And she does so because she responds in the same register to the desires of the men who have been awaiting her verdict for three years. This is an erotic desire to which she reacts, first, with seductive wiles of messages and promises, and then by inviting them to demonstrate their excellence, not in terms of wealth and social prestige, but in terms of something extremely personal and physical. In order to please Penelope, they have to be on par with Ulysses in showing the might of their bodies.

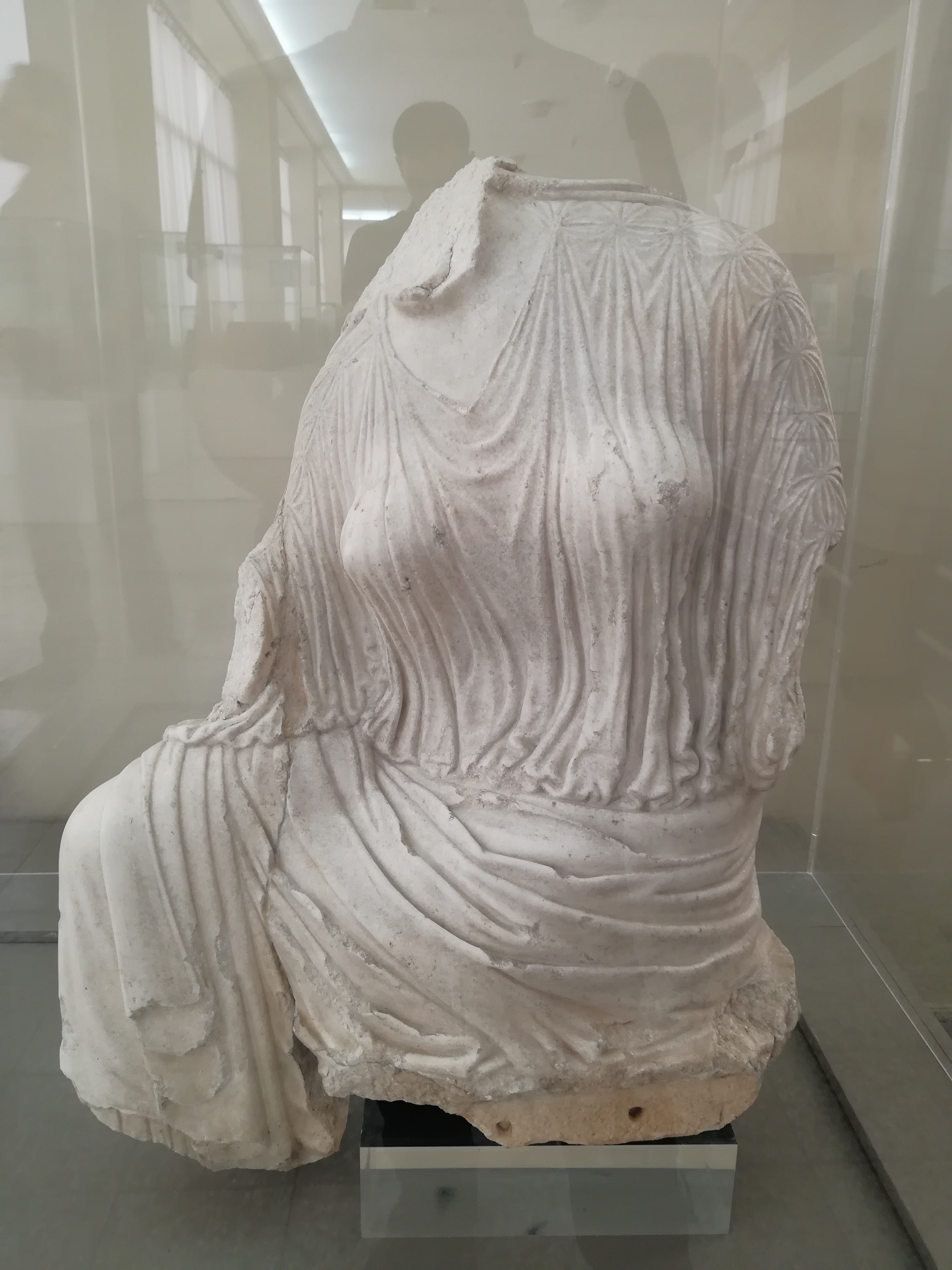
Among the four surviving statues of Penelope, this is the oldest dating back to the 5th century BC, crafted 300 years after Homer composed The Odyssey. Discovered in Persepolis and housed at National Museum of Iran, the other three are kept at Vatican Museum and Capitoline Museum in Rome.

She is ambivalent, variously asking Artemis to kill her and apparently considering marrying one of the suitors. When the disguised Odysseus returns, she announces in her long interview with him that whoever can string Odysseus's rigid bow and shoot an arrow through twelve axe heads may have her hand. "For the plot of the Odyssey, of course, her decision is the turning point, the move that makes possible the long-predicted triumph of the returning hero".

There is debate as to whether Penelope knows that it is Odysseus. Penelope and the suitors know that Odysseus (were he in fact present) would easily surpass them all in any test of masculine skill, so she may have started the contest as an opportunity for him to reveal his identity. On the other hand, because Odysseus seems to be the only person (except, perhaps, Telemachus) who can actually use the bow, she could just be further delaying her marriage to one of the suitors.

When the contest of the bow begins, none of the suitors are able to string the bow, except Odysseus who wins the contest. Having done so, he proceeds to slaughter the suitors – beginning with Antinous whom he finds drinking from his cup – with help from Telemachus, Athena and the slaves Eumaeus the swineherd and Philoetius the cowherd. Odysseus has now revealed himself in all his glory (with a little makeover by Athena); yet Penelope cannot believe that her husband has really returned – she fears that it is perhaps some god in disguise, as in the story of Alcmene – and tests him by ordering her slave Eurycleia to move the bed in their bridal-chamber. Odysseus protests that this cannot be done, since he made the bed himself and knows that one of its legs is a living olive tree. Penelope finally accepts that he truly is Odysseus, a moment that highlights their homophrosýnē (ὁμοφροσύνη, "like-mindedness"). Homer implies that from then on Odysseus would live a long and happy life together with Penelope and Telemachus, wisely ruling his kingdom, and enjoying wide respect and much success.

=== Role in the Telegony ===
Penelope also appears in the lost Greek epic Telegony, which survives only in a summary. The poem's contents fell chronologically after those of the Odyssey. In this epic, Odysseus had a son called Telegonus with Circe when he was on her island. When Telegonus grew to manhood, Circe sent him in search of Odysseus. Shipwrecked on Ithaca by a storm, Telegonus misidentified the island and, assailed by hunger, began plundering it. Odysseus and his oldest son, Telemachus, defended their city and, in the ensuing melée, Telegonus accidentally killed his father with a lance tipped with the venomous spine of a stingray. After discovering the identity of his father, Telegonus brought Telemachus and Penelope to Circe's island. Here, Athena ordered the marriage of Telemachus to Telegonus's mother, the enchantress Circe, while Telegonus married the newly widowed Penelope. After burying Odysseus, Circe made the other three immortal. According to Hyginus, Penelope and Telegonus had a son called Italus who, according to some accounts, gave his name to Italy. This legend inspired Sophocles's lost tragedy Odysseus Acanthoplex.

=== Later sources ===
In some early sources such as Pindar, Pan's parents are Apollo and Penelope. Herodotus, Cicero, Apollodorus, and Hyginus all describe Hermes and Penelope as his parents. Pausanias records the story that Penelope had in fact been unfaithful to Odysseus, who banished her to Mantineia upon his return. In the 5th century AD Nonnus names Pan's mother as Penelope of Mantineia in Arcadia. Other sources report that Penelope had slept with all 108 suitors in Odysseus's absence, and gave birth to Pan as a result. This myth reflects the folk etymology that equates Pan's name (Πάν) with the Greek word for "all" (πᾶν). (Note: The Homeric Hymn to Pan is the earliest known example of such wordplay: It suggests that Pan’s name was based on the fact that he delighted “all” of the gods.) The Odyssey carefully suppresses this variant tradition.

== Iconography ==
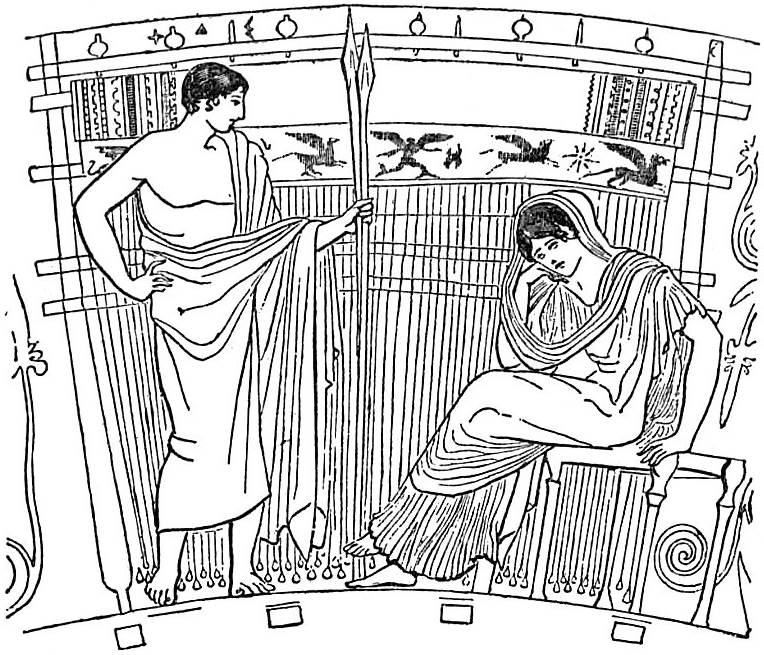
Drawing of a depiction on an Ancient Greek pottery vessel. Penelope sits before a tapestry on a warp-weighted loom

Penelope is recognizable in Greek and Roman works, from Attic vase-paintings—the Penelope Painter is recognized by his representations of her—to Roman sculptures copying or improvising classical Greek models. She is seated with her hand leaning on her cheek, and protectively crossing her legs which reflects her long chastity in Odysseus's absence: an unusual pose in any other figure.

== Latin tradition ==
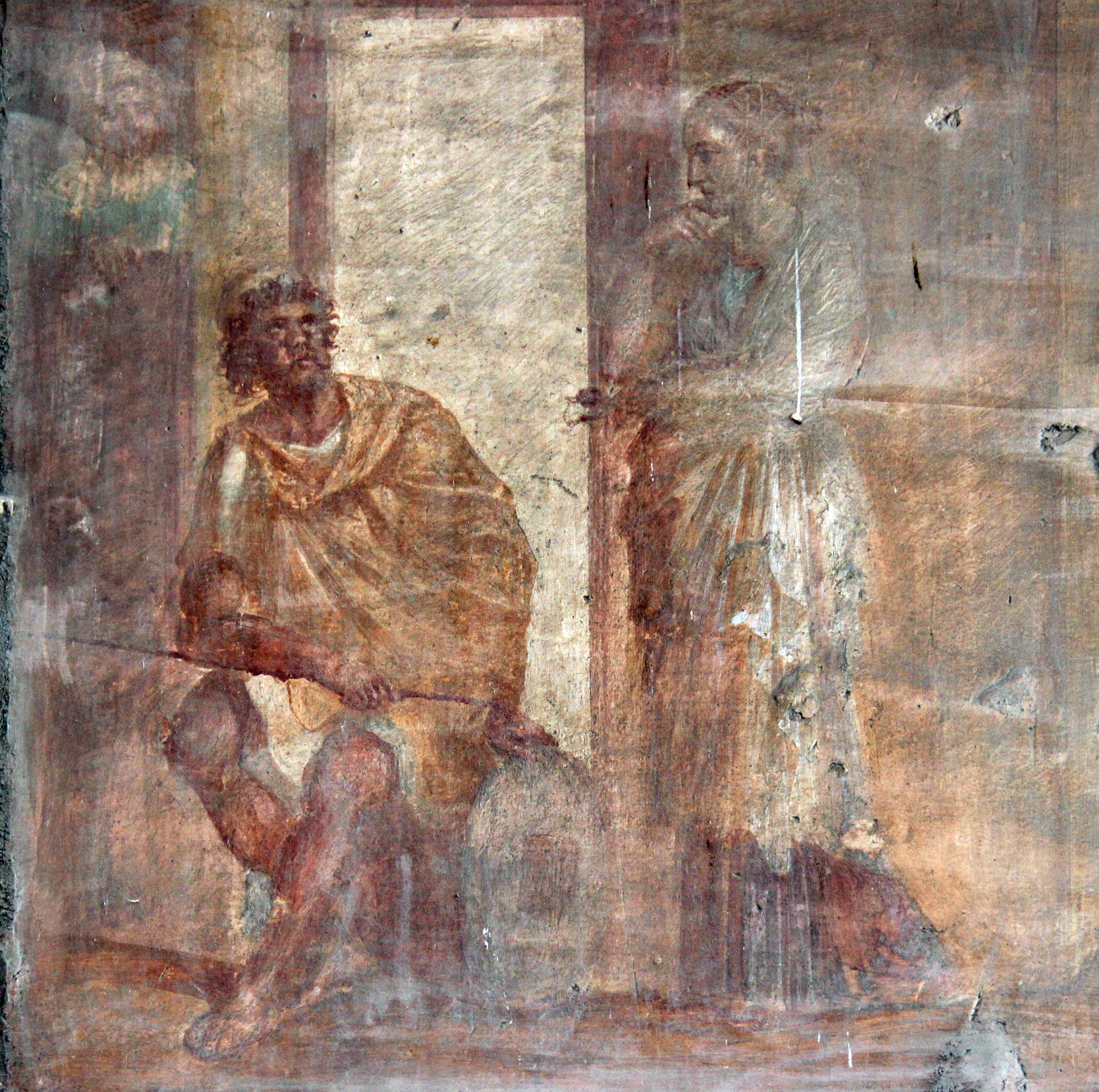
Penelope encounters the returned Odysseus posing as a beggar. From a mural in the Macellum of Pompeii

Latin references to Penelope revolved around her sexual fidelity to the absent Odysseus. It suited the marital aspect of Roman society representing the tranquility of the worthy family. She is mentioned by classical authors including Plautus, Propertius, Horace, Ovid, Martial and Statius.

The presence of Penelope in Latin texts provided a basis for her ongoing image in the Middle Ages and Renaissance as a representation of a chaste wife. She was named by Saint Jerome among pagan women who are known for their chastity.
