= Dulichium =

Unidentified place in Greek history

Dulichium (/d(j)ʊˈlɪkiəm/ dew-LICK-ee-əm; Ancient Greek: Δουλίχιον, Doulíkhion), also called Dolicha (/ˈdɒlɪkə/ DOLL-ick-ə; Δολίχα, Dolíkhā) or Doliche (/ˈdɒlɪˌkiː/ DOLL-ih-KEE; Δολίχη, Dolíkhē), was a place noted by numerous ancient writers that was either a city on, or an island off, the Ionian Sea coast of Acarnania, Greece.

== Stories ==
In the Iliad, the Catalogue of Ships says that Meges, son of Phyleus, led 40 ships to Troy from Dulichium and the sacred islands he calls Echinae (the Echinades), which are situated beyond the sea, opposite Elis. Phyleus was the son of Augeas, king of the Epeians in Elis, who emigrated to Dulichium because he had incurred his father's anger.

In the Odyssey, however, Dulichium is implied to be part of Odysseus's kingdom, not of Meges's kingdom. In the Odyssey, the island is ruled by king Acastus (Od.14. 335-6) and has the largest contingent of suitors, fifty two in total, who are led by Amphinomus, Penelope's favourite owing to his good nature (Od. 16. 247-8; 394-398)). Disguised as the beggar Aethon of Crete, Odysseus claims that he arrived on Ithaca en route from Thesprotia to Dulichium, where he was to be received by its king. Dulichium is frequently mentioned along with Same, Zacynthus, and Ithaca as one of the islands associated with Odysseus' territorial possessions, and is celebrated for its fertility. Nonetheless, the Odyssey does not explicitly state that Dulichium is a subject state under the rule of Odysseus' Ithacan kingdom.

Another story has Dulichium placed approximately 3 kilometers (1.9 mi) from the island of Cephalonia but reportedly sunk following an earthquake.

== Analysis ==
The site of Dulichium gave rise to much dispute in antiquity. Hellanicus supposed that it was the ancient name of Cephalonia; and Andron, that it was one of the cities of Cephalonia, which Pherecydes supposed to be Pale, an opinion supported by Pausanias. However, Strabo maintains that Dulichium was one of the Echinades, and identifies it with Dolicha (ἡ Δολίχα), an island which he describes as situated opposite Oeniadae and the mouth of the Achelous, and distant 100 stadia from the promontory of Araxos in Elis. Dolicha appears to be the same which now bears the synonymous appellation of Makri, derived from its long narrow form.

Most modern writers have followed Strabo in connecting Dulichium with the Echinades, though it seems impossible to conclusively identify it with any particular island. It is observed by Leake that Petalas, being the largest of the Echinades, and possessing the advantage of two well-sheltered harbours, seems to have the best claim to be considered the ancient Dulichium. It is, indeed, a mere rock, but being separated only by a strait of a few hundred meters from the fertile plains at the mouth of the Achelous and river of Oenia, its natural deficiencies may have been there supplied, and the epithets of grassy and abounding in wheat, which Homer applies to Dulichium—Δουλιχίου πολυπύρου, ποιήεντος—may be referred to that part of its territory. But Leake adds, with justice, that there is no proof in the Iliad or Odyssey that Dulichium, although at the head of an insular confederacy, was itself an island: it may very possibly, therefore, have been a city on the coast of Acarnania, opposite to the Echinades, perhaps at Tragamesti, or more probably at the harbour named Pandeleimona or Platya, which is separated only by a channel of a mile or two from the Echinades. Wilhelm Dörpfeld supported the theory of Hellanicus that Dulichium was the Homeric name of Cephalonia.
