= Eumaeus =

Slave of Odysseus in the Odyssey

Eumaeus with Eurycleia and Odysseus on an Attic red-figure skyphos by the Penelope Painter.

In Greek mythology, Eumaeus (/juːˈmiːəs/; Ancient Greek: Eupaioc Eúmaios meaning 'searching well') was Odysseus's slave, swineherd, and friend. His father, Ctesius, son of Ormenus, was king of an island called Syra (present-day Syros in the Greek islands of the Cyclades).

== Mythology ==
When he was a young child, a Phoenician sailor seduced his nurse, a slave, who agreed to bring the child among other treasures in exchange for their help in her escape. The nurse was killed by Artemis on the journey by sea, but the sailors continued to Ithaca where Odysseus's father Laertes bought him as a slave. Thereafter he was brought up with Odysseus and his sister Ctimene (or Ktimene) and was treated by Anticleia, their mother, almost as Ctimene's equal.

In Homer's Odyssey, Eumaeus is the first person that Odysseus meets upon his return to Ithaca after fighting in the Trojan War. He has four dogs, "savage as wild beasts", who protect his pigs. Although he does not recognize his old master – Odysseus is in disguise – and has his misgivings, Eumaeus treats Odysseus well, offering food and shelter to one whom he thinks is simply a pauper. On being pushed to explain himself, Odysseus spins a distorted tale, the Cretan Lie, misleading Eumaeus into believing that he is the son not of Laertes but of Castor.

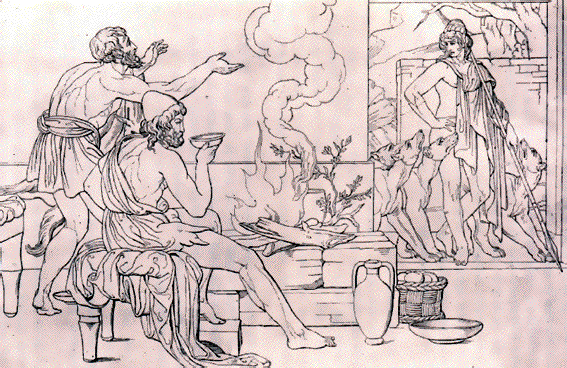
Bonaventura Genelli, Odysseus sits by the fire as Eumaeus discovers Telemachus at the entrance of his hut.

Eumaeus refuses to accept the assurance that Odysseus is finally on his way home, though he loves him above all others (rendering him especially bitter towards the suitors of Penelope). He has become inured to such claims owing to their frequency during Odysseus's absence, and additionally because he had been misled previously by an impostor from Aetolia. He cautions:

Don't you try to gratify or soothe my heart with falsehoods.
It is not for that reason that I shall respect and entertain you, but because
I fear Zeus, the patron of strangers, and pity you.

God-fearing, suspicious, and scrupulous, Eumaeus delivers probably the oldest extant example of literary sarcasm when, after Odysseus offers a bargain entailing that he be thrown off a cliff should he lose, he answers:

That would be virtuous of me, my friend, and good reputation would
be mine among men, for present time alike and hereafter,
if first I led you into my shelter, there entertained you as guest,
then murdered you and ravished the dear life from you.
Then cheerfully I could go and pray to Zeus, son of Kronos.
(XIV.402–6, Lattimore translation)

Eumaeus is generous in his offerings to guests and gods (Hermes in particular) and he strives to divide meals equally between everyone he feeds.

During his master's long absence, Eumaeus acquires from the Taphians a servant, Mesaulius, with his own ostensibly meagre resources. Mesaulius serves as a waiter during Odysseus's first supper back on Ithaca, in Eumaeus's hut with its owner and his fellow herders.

Eumaeus also welcomes Odysseus's son, Telemachus, when he returns from his voyage to Pylos and Sparta. When Telemachus returns, he visits Eumaeus as soon as he gets off his boat, as Athena directed him. In Eumaeus's hut is Odysseus in disguise. Eumaeus greets Telemachus as a father, expressing his deep worry while Telemachus was gone and his relief now that he is safely back. Homer even uses a simile to reiterate the father–son relationship between Telemachus and Eumaeus. He says,

And as a loving father embraces his own son
Come back from a distant land after ten long years,
His only son, greatly beloved and much sorrowed for

(Odyssey, Book 16 lines 19–21)

With Odysseus sitting beside Eumaeus and Telemachus, the audience is especially aware of this relationship.

During the slaughter of the suitors, Eumaeus, along with fellow servant Philoetius, assists Telemachus and Odysseus.

== See also ==
- 12972 Eumaios, Jovian asteroid
- Greek mythology in popular culture
- Melanthius, Odysseus's goatherd
