= Philoetius =

Character in Greek mythology

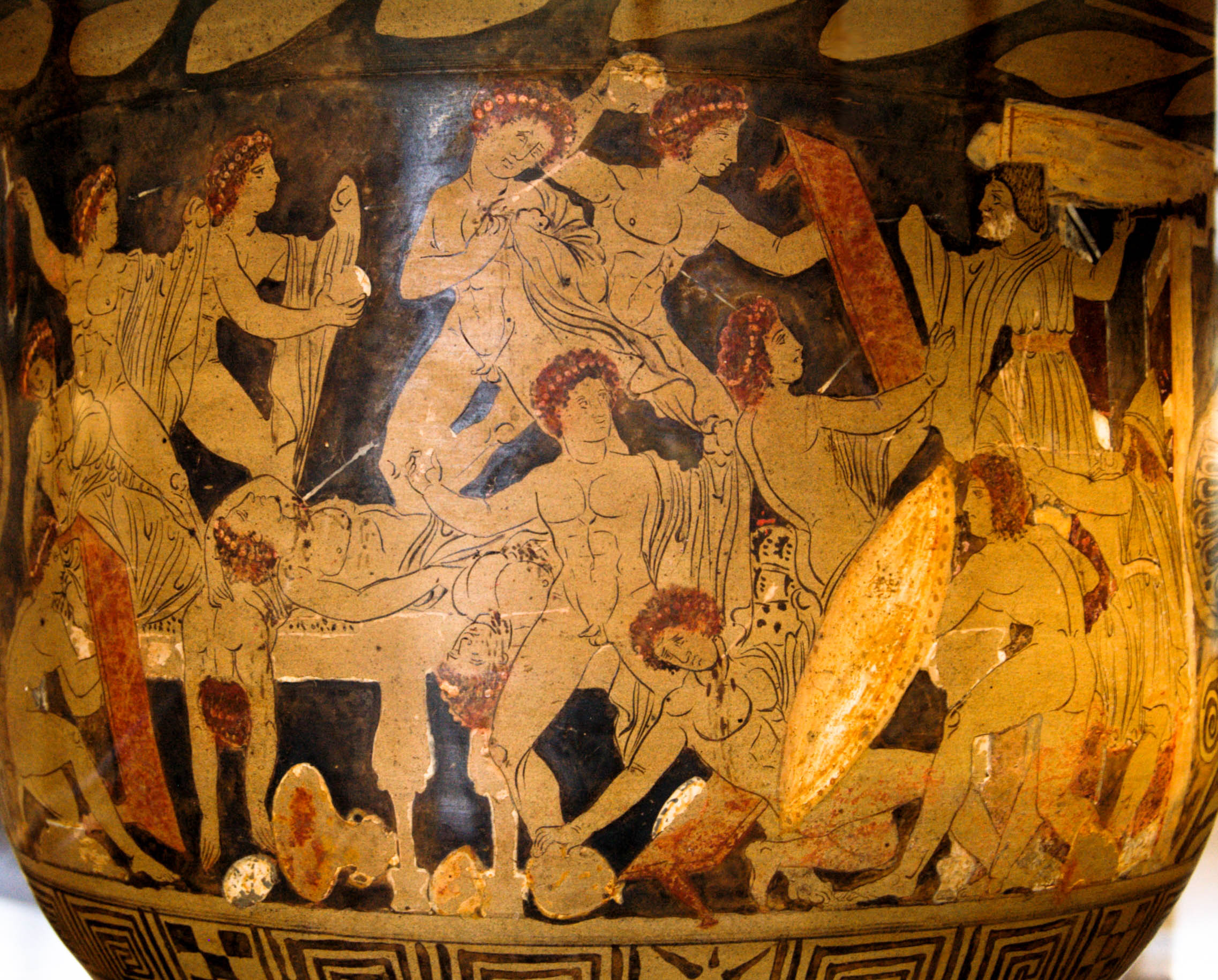
Slaughter of the suitors of Penelope by Odysseus and Telemachus, assisted by Eumaeus and Philoetius. Campanian red-figure bell-krater, c. 330 BC, Louvre (CA 7124)

Philoetius (/fɪˈliːʃiəs/; Ancient Greek: Φιλοίτιος, romanized: Philoítios) is a character in Greek mythology who plays a significant role in Homer's Odyssey, aiding Odysseus, Telemachus, and Eumaeus in their slaughter of the suitors of Penelope.

== Mythology ==
In Homer's Odyssey, Philoetius is Odysseus's primary cowherd. He remains loyal to Odysseus for the entire duration of Odysseus's absence from his kingdom. When Odysseus finally returns to Ithaca after being away for twenty years, Philoetius is one of the few slaves who has not betrayed him.

Just before the climactic final scene of the Odyssey, Odysseus commands Philoetius and Eumaeus to lock the doors of the palace in order to prevent any of the suitors from escaping. He also orders them to steal all of the suitors' weapons and hide them in order to prevent the suitors from fighting back. During the final battle itself, Philoetius joins the fight and slays the suitor Peisander. Odysseus later promises both Philoetius and Eumaeus freedom and power for having remained loyal to him even after all the other slaves betrayed him.
