= The Odyssey (2026 film) =

Film by Christopher Nolan

- Theatrical release poster
- Directed by: Christopher Nolan
- Screenplay by: Christopher Nolan
- Based on: Homer's Odyssey
- Produced by: Emma Thomas; Christopher Nolan
- Starring: Matt Damon; Tom Holland; Anne Hathaway; Robert Pattinson; Lupita Nyong'o; Samantha Morton; Zendaya; Charlize Theron
- Cinematography: Hoyte van Hoytema
- Edited by: Jennifer Lame
- Music by: Ludwig Göransson
- Production companies: Universal Pictures; Syncopy
- Distributed by: Universal Pictures
- Release dates: July 6, 2026 (Odeon Luxe Leicester Square); July 17, 2026 (United States and United Kingdom)
- Running time: 173 minutes
- Countries: United States; United Kingdom
- Language: English
- Budget: $250 million
- Box office: $1.805 billion

The Odyssey is a 2026 epic action fantasy film written and directed by Christopher Nolan, who produced it with his wife Emma Thomas. An adaptation of Homer's ancient Greek epic poem the Odyssey, it stars an ensemble cast including Matt Damon, Tom Holland, Anne Hathaway, Robert Pattinson, Lupita Nyong'o, Samantha Morton, Zendaya, and Charlize Theron. In the film, Odysseus (Damon), the Greek king of Ithaca, undergoes a long and perilous journey home after the Trojan War and encounters mythical beings as he attempts to reunite with his wife, Penelope (Hathaway).

Nolan began writing the script in March 2024 and secured the project with Universal Pictures by October. The Odyssey was announced in December. Casting took place from late 2024 through early 2025, and Damon was confirmed for the lead role in February 2025. Nolan studied several translations of the Odyssey before deciding upon a realistic interpretation of Greek mythology, drawing inspiration from the epic historical films Andrei Rublev (1966) and Ran (1985), as well as the films of special effects artist Ray Harryhausen. Filming took place on location from February to August 2025 in Morocco, Greece, Italy, Scotland, Iceland, Western Sahara, and Malta, as well as at the Universal Studios Lot in Los Angeles. With an estimated budget of $250 million, it is among the most expensive films of Nolan's career, and the first feature film to be shot entirely on IMAX's 70 mm film cameras.

The Odyssey premiered at the Odeon Luxe Leicester Square in London on July 6, 2026, ahead of a theatrical release by Universal Pictures on July 17 in the United States and the United Kingdom. It was made available in IMAX and multiple premium large formats. The film received acclaim for its direction, performances, and set pieces, though some criticized Nolan's deviations from the source material. It grossed $1.805 billion worldwide, becoming Nolan's highest-grossing film, the second-highest-grossing film of 2026, the highest-grossing R-rated film ever, the highest-grossing film distributed by Universal, and the eleventh-highest-grossing film of all time.

== Plot ==
For twenty years, Odysseus, the king of Ithaca, did not return from the Trojan War. Several suitors, including nobleman Antinous, aggressively court Odysseus's wife Penelope to claim the throne from Odysseus and Penelope's son Telemachus. Only Penelope, Telemachus, and Odysseus' half-blind servant Eumaeus still believe Odysseus will return. Penelope tells Telemachus she fears attacks by murderous "Sea Peoples" who violate Zeus's law, the custom of respect between guests and hosts. Telemachus travels with Odysseus's friend Mentor to Menelaus, the king of Sparta, to learn where his father is. Antinous learns of this and conspires to kill Telemachus when he returns and plunder Ithaca. Menelaus and his wife, Helen, tell Telemachus about the war but remain uncertain about Odysseus's fate.

Meanwhile, the goddess Athena appears to Odysseus on the island of Ogygia, where the nymph Calypso is infatuated with Odysseus. Athena commands Odysseus to return home; Calypso dislikes this, but encourages Odysseus to remember his past. Years ago, the Greek army, led by Menelaus' brother Agamemnon, conquered Troy using Odysseus' stratagem, the Trojan Horse, by hiding the Greeks inside, with the soldier Sinon sacrificed as a decoy. While Menelaus and Agamemnon returned home, Odysseus and his crew, including second-in-command Eurylochus, searched an island for supplies. However, the Cyclops Polyphemus traps them in a cave and devours several soldiers. They blind Polyphemus and escape, but hear him cry out to his father, the sea god Poseidon. As a result, the crew faces harsh sea conditions. They land on Telepylus, where Laestrygonians (man-eating giants) kill most of them and sink two of their three ships. The survivors rebel, leaving Odysseus with their ship as they seek refuge on Aeaea with the witch Circe, who turns them into pigs. After Odysseus persuades her to change his men back, Circe advises that to reach Ithaca, Odysseus must cross the river Oceanus into Hades.

There, Odysseus meets his fallen soldiers, including Sinon's shade, who reproaches him for deceiving him, and reveals that Antinous manipulated him into taking his place in the Greek army. Next, Agamemnon's shade reveals that his wife Clytemnestra murdered him upon his return as revenge for sacrificing their daughter Iphigenia to Artemis for fair seas. Finally, Odysseus speaks with the shade of the prophet Tiresias, who predicts that, by divine will, only Odysseus will return home. Chased from the underworld by Odysseus' fallen army, Odysseus follows Tiresias' guidance to survive encounters with the Sirens and sea monsters Charybdis and Scylla. On Thrinacia, Odysseus warns his men not to kill the cattle of Apollo, as Tiresias foretold Odysseus' men would die if they did, but the starving men disobey. Zeus sends a storm that sinks their ship, killing all but Odysseus. He washes ashore unconscious on Ogygia, where Calypso's lotus flowers render him amnesic.

After seven years, Odysseus regains his memories, builds a raft, and surrenders his fate to the storm. He washes ashore in Ithaca, where he disguises himself as "Sinon". Eumaeus tells him that the suitors sent bandits to assassinate Telemachus and Mentor. The bandits kill Mentor, but Odysseus rescues Telemachus and kills the bandits. Odysseus's elderly dog Argos dies after recognizing Odysseus, and Telemachus deduces Odysseus's identity. During a feast, Odysseus confronts Antinous about betraying Sinon. Antinous thrashes Odysseus before Telemachus intervenes.

After the meal, Odysseus, still disguised, confesses to Penelope his guilt for violating Zeus's law during the sacking of Troy, desecrating the statue of Athena after killing her priestess (whose form Athena assumed in visions), and initiating the Late Bronze Age collapse. He reveals that the "sea people" were the Greeks themselves, and begs Penelope's forgiveness. Penelope announces she is ready to remarry and tells the suitors to return at dawn.

Penelope declares she will marry whoever can string Odysseus' bow and shoot an arrow through a row of axe heads, as Odysseus did before leaving for the Trojan War. All the suitors fail, but Odysseus succeeds, thereby revealing his identity. The hall erupts in battle. Telemachus helps Odysseus kill many of the most challenging suitors, including Antinous. After the remaining suitors surrender, Odysseus cedes his throne to Telemachus and leaves with Penelope to seek peace in exile. Sailing west to honor Odysseus' fallen soldiers, the couple expect civilization to be renewed and muse that time will forget Odysseus' mistakes.

== Cast ==
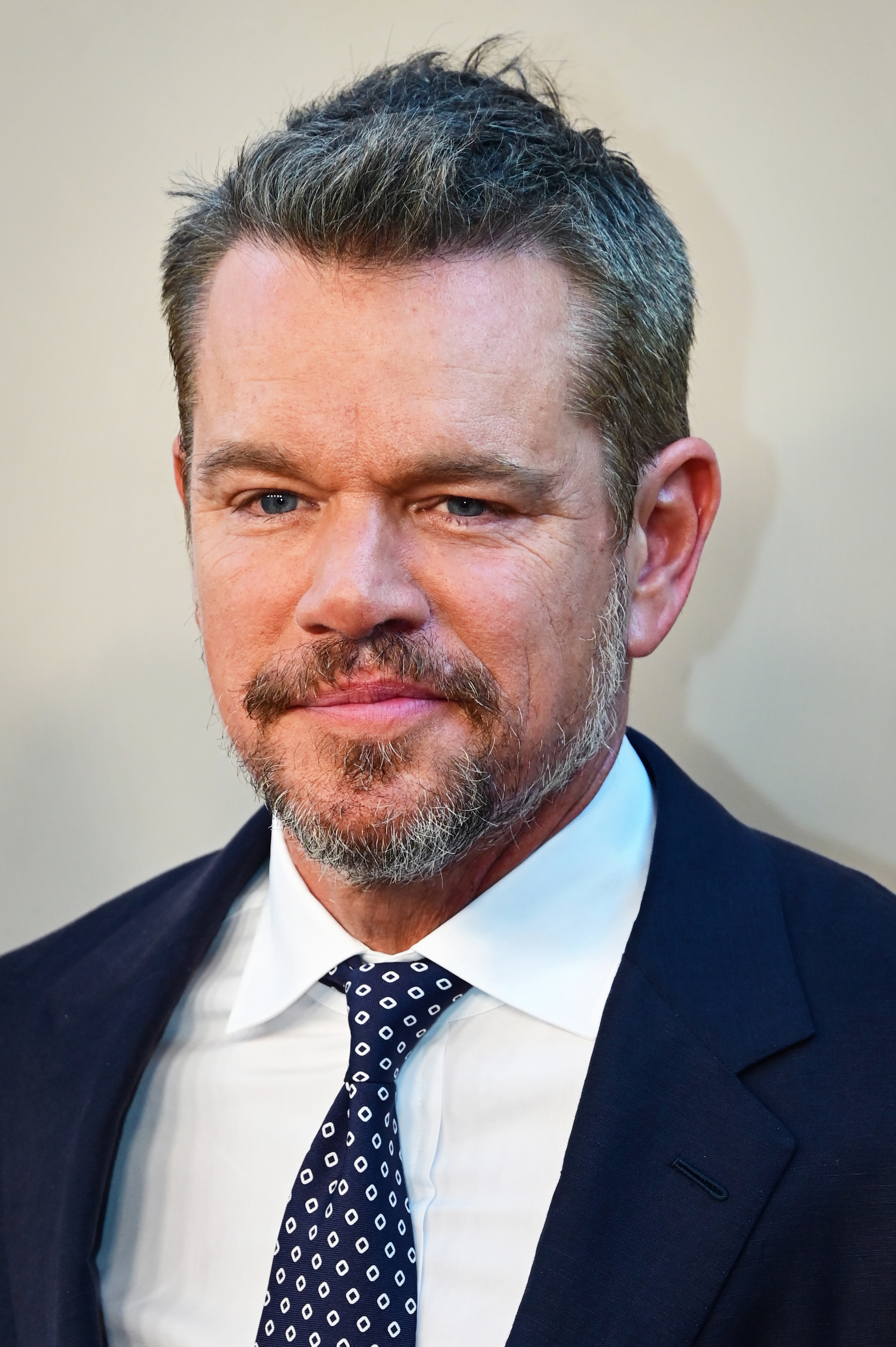
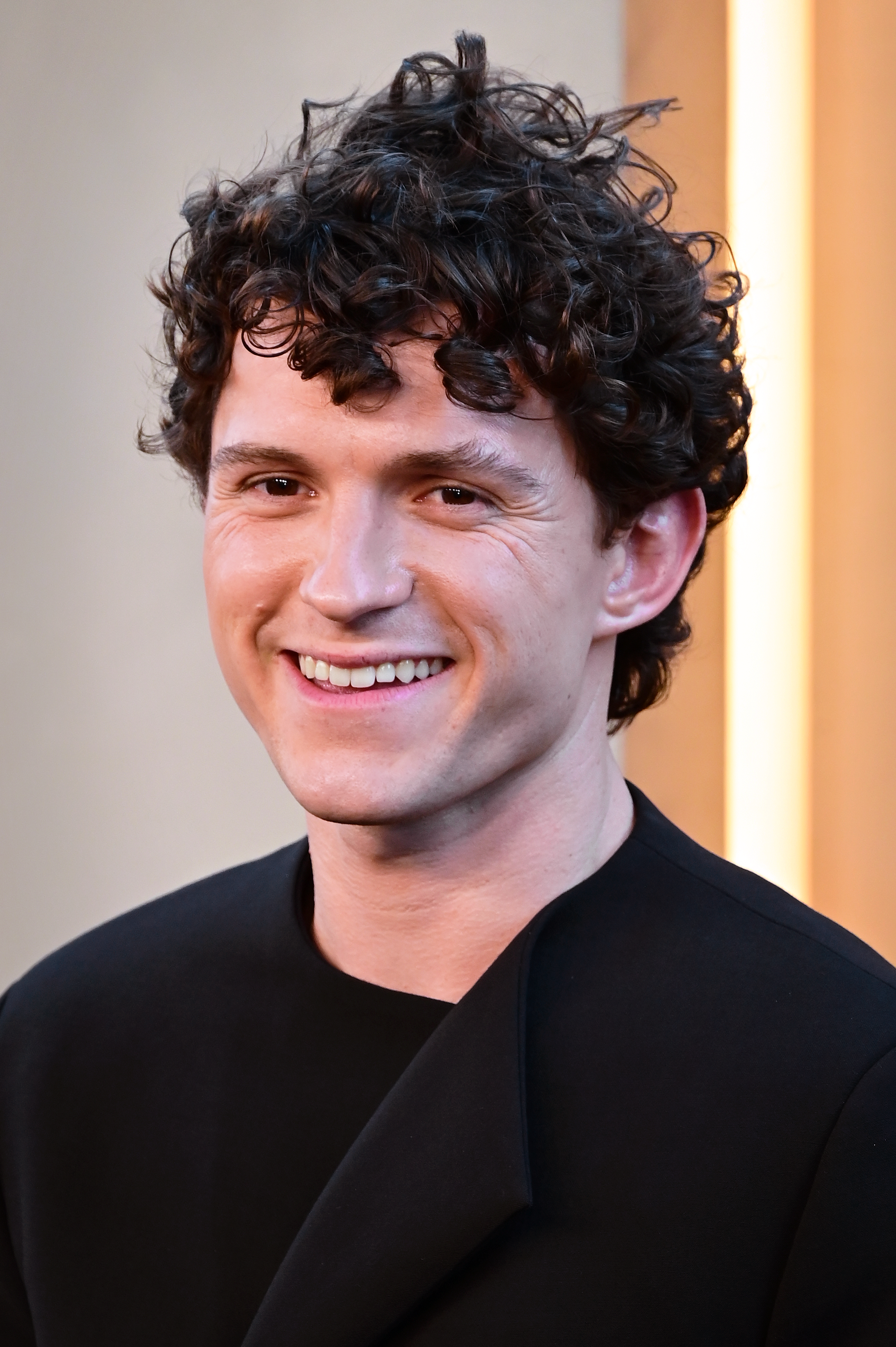
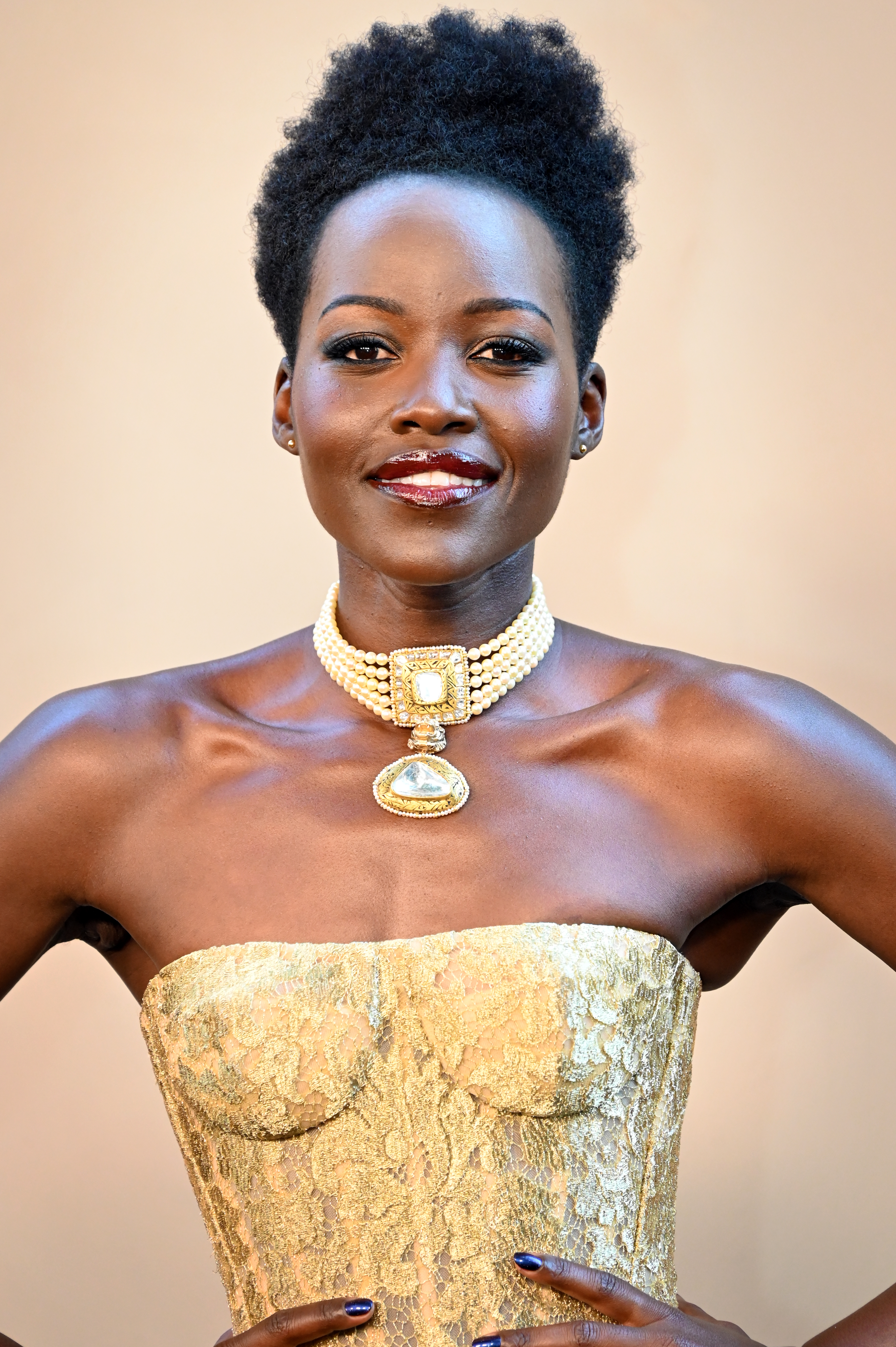
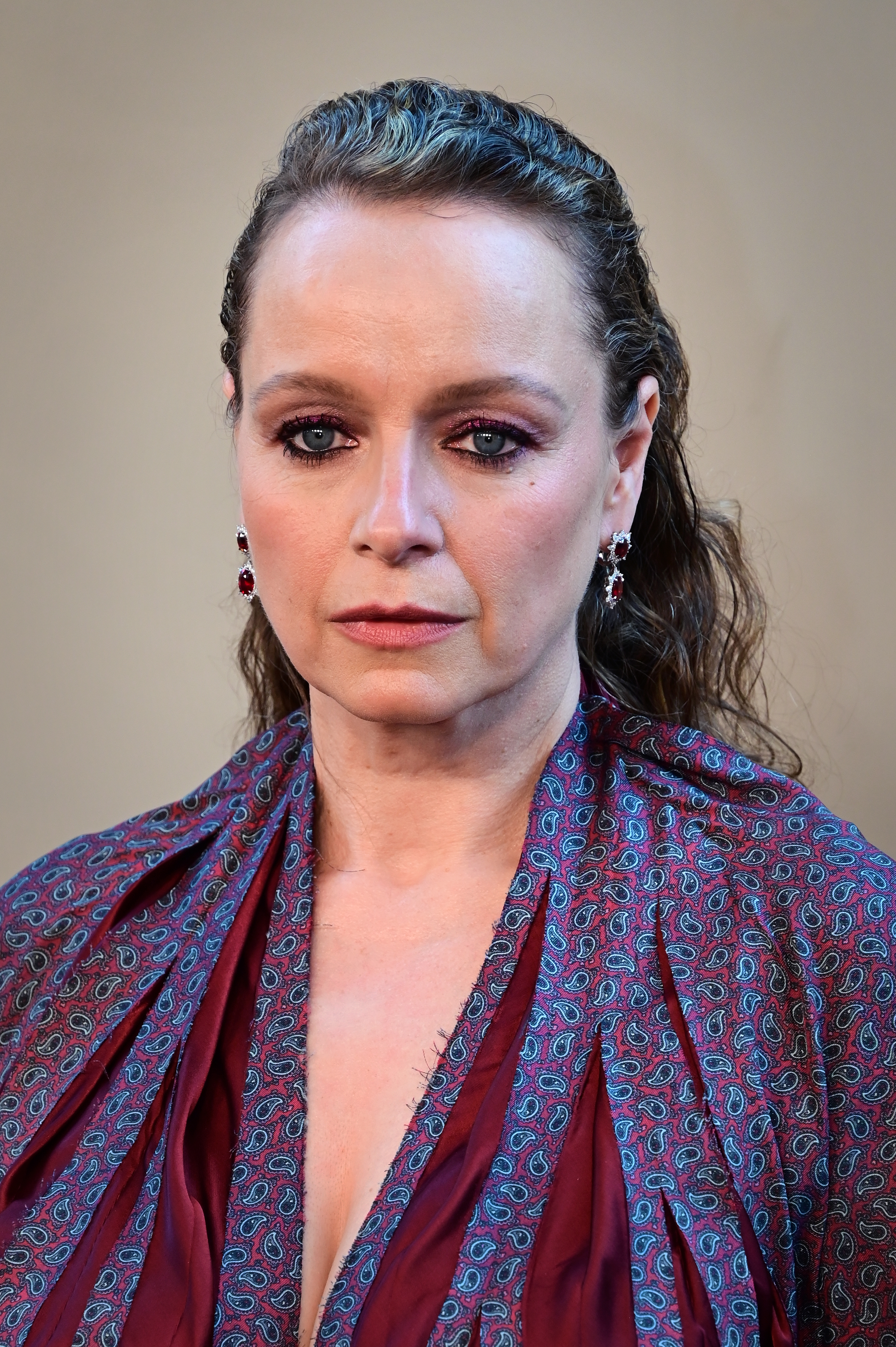
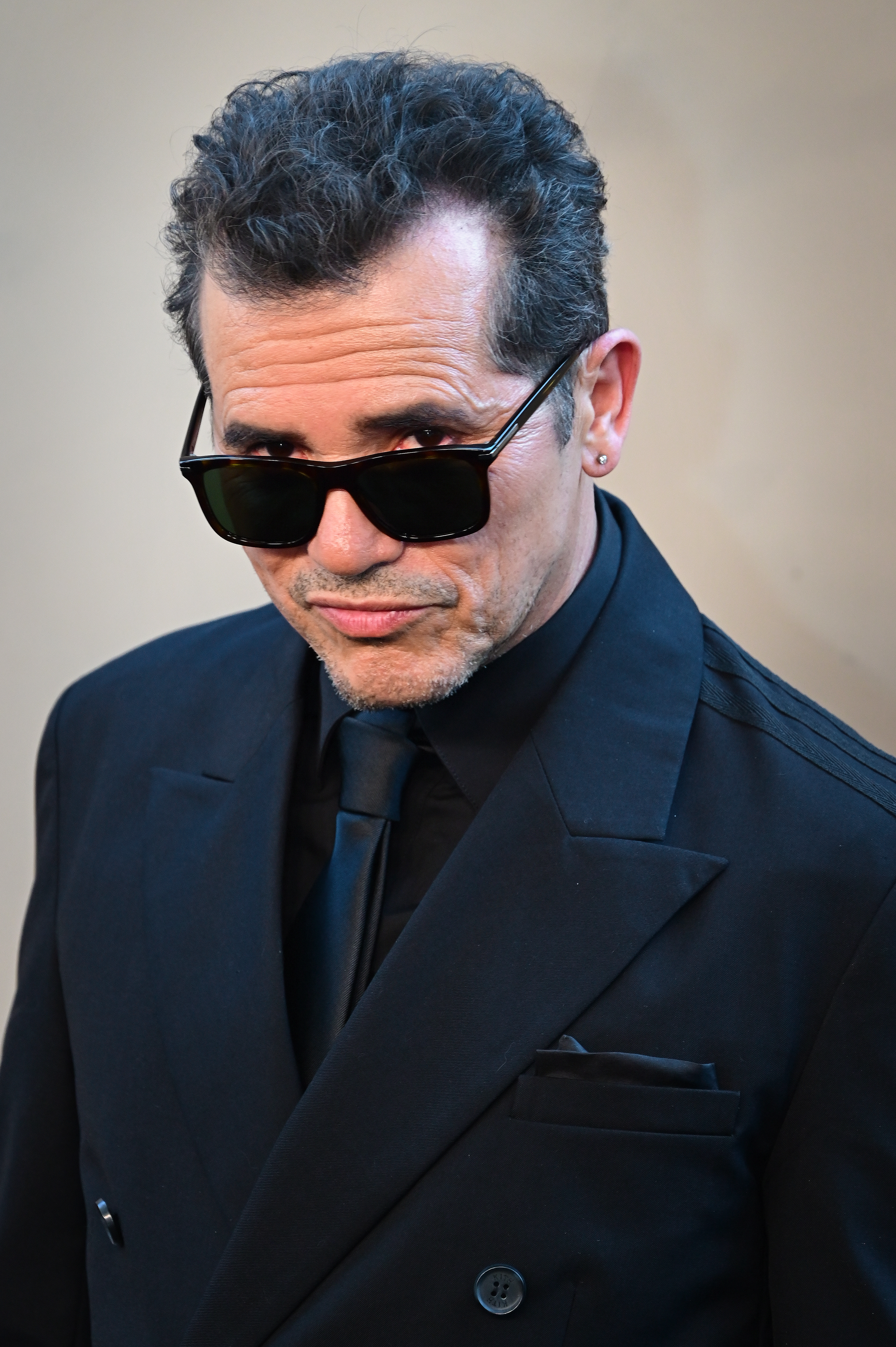
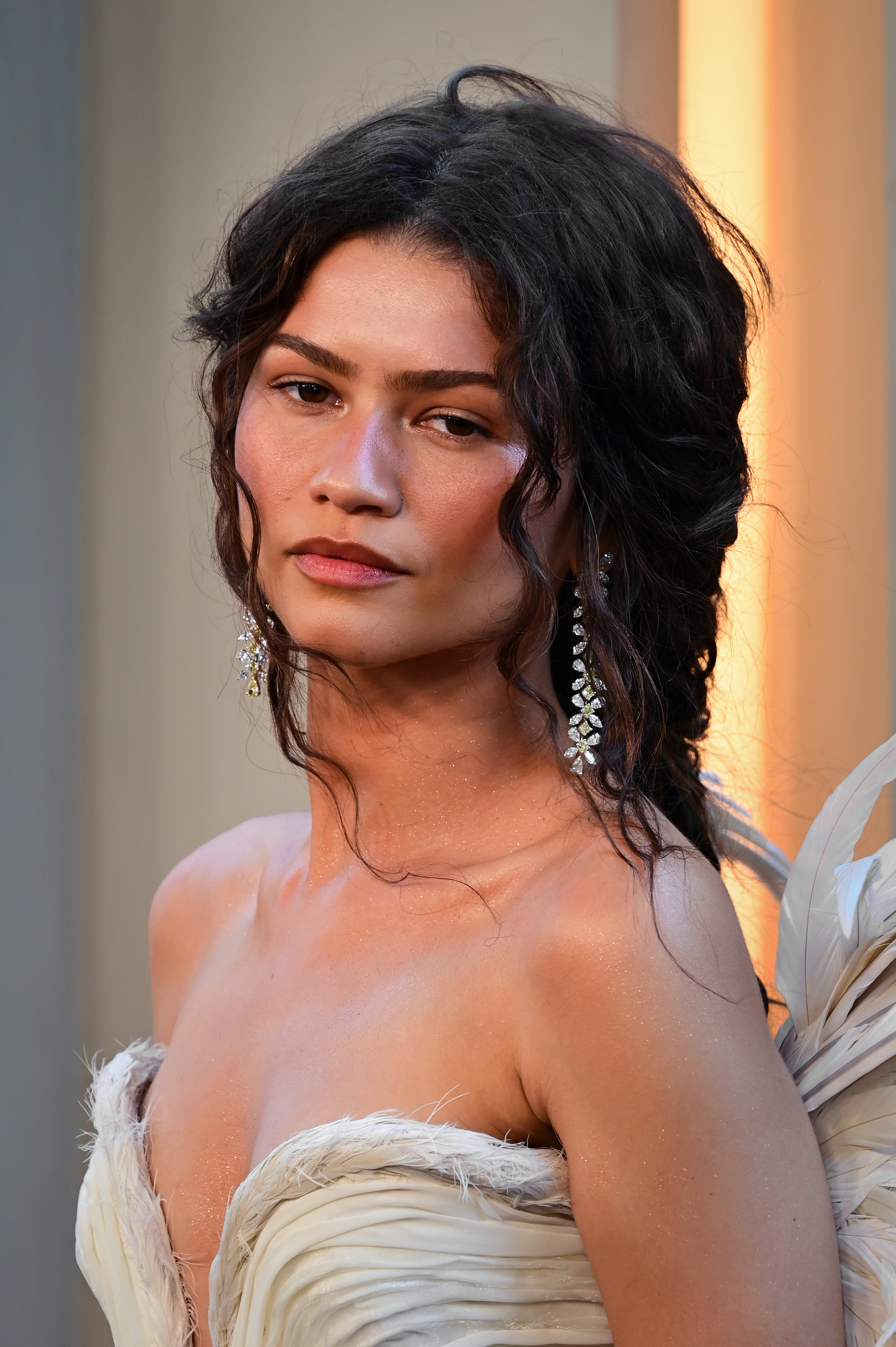
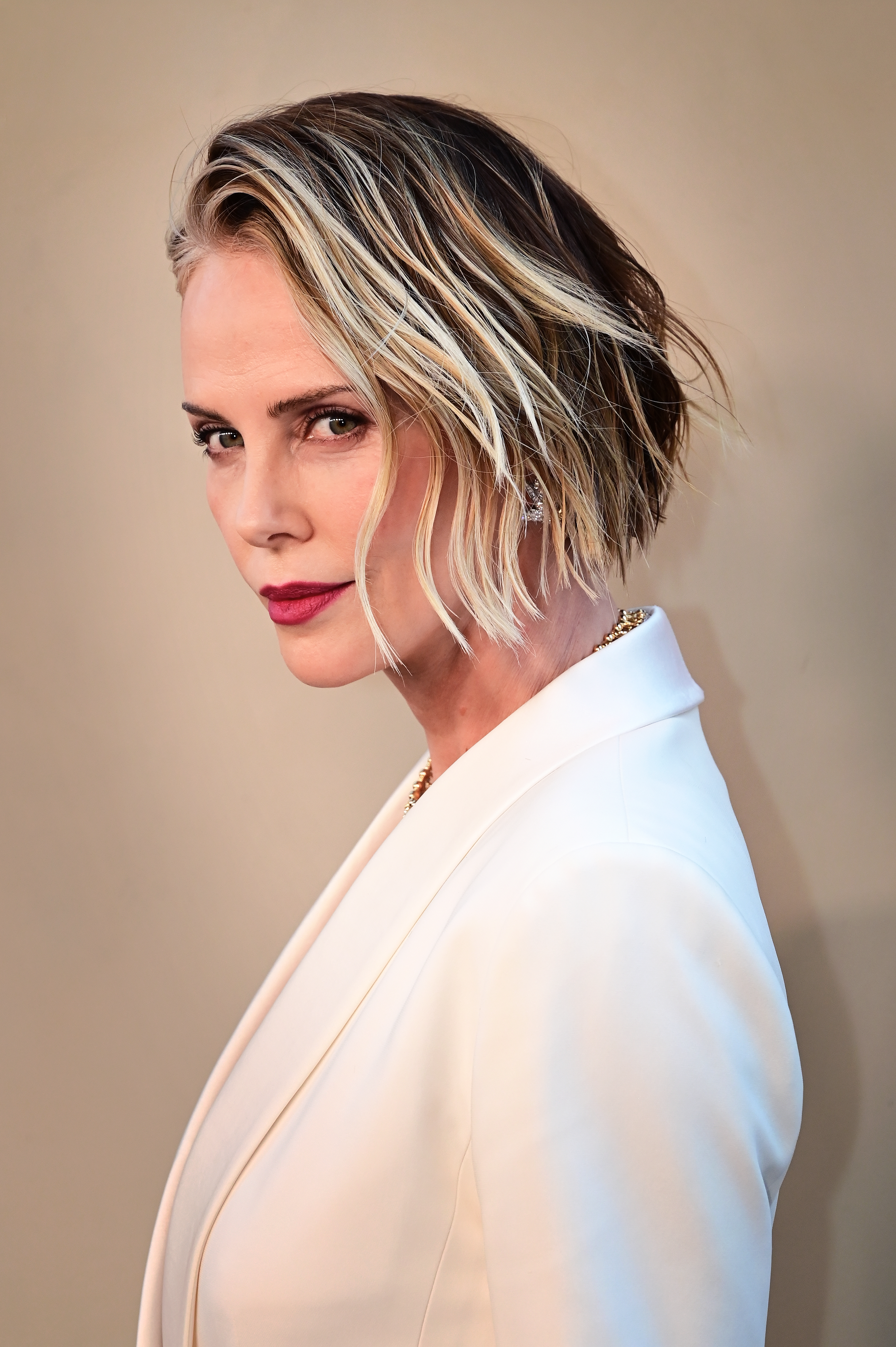
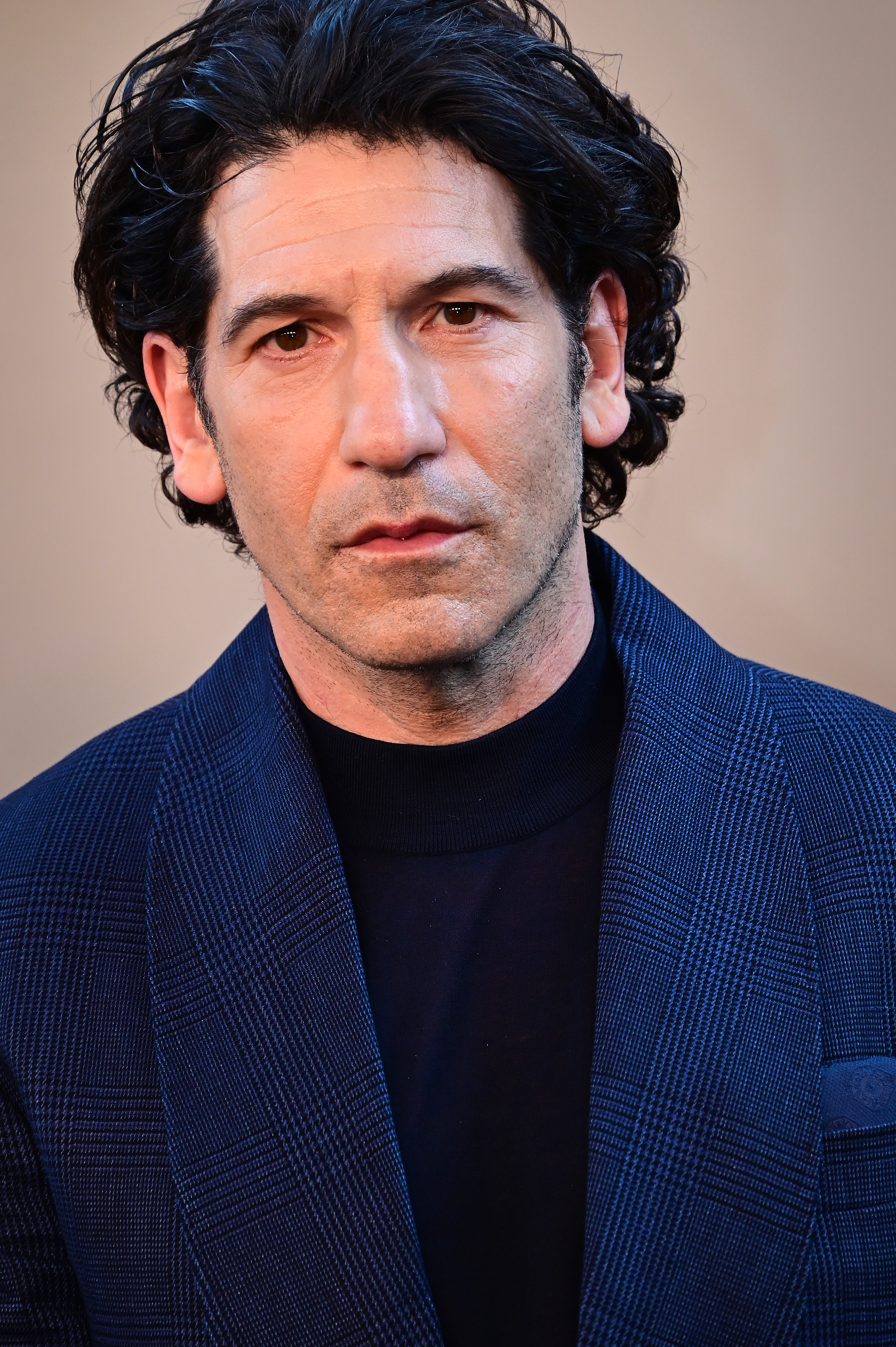
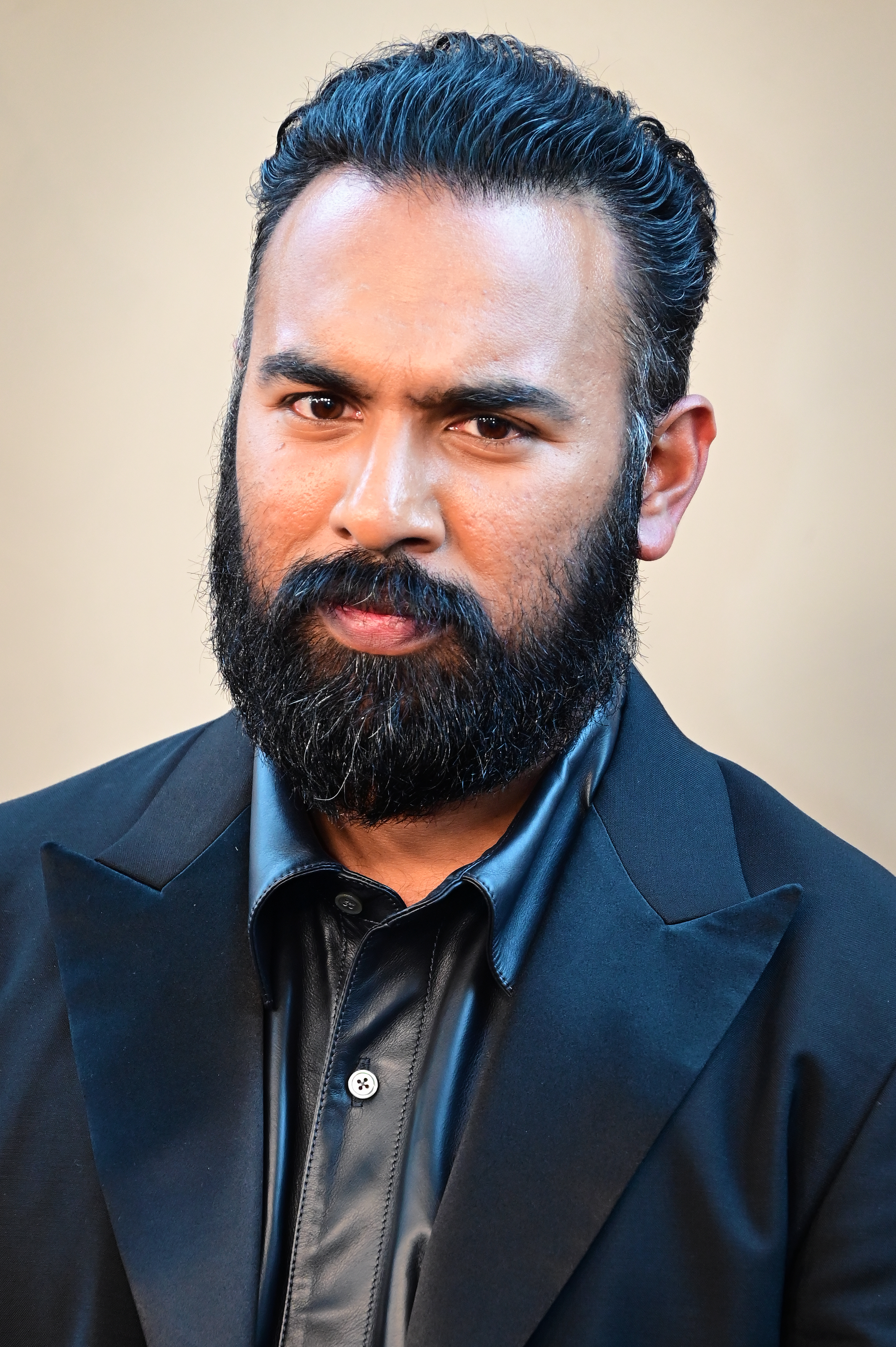
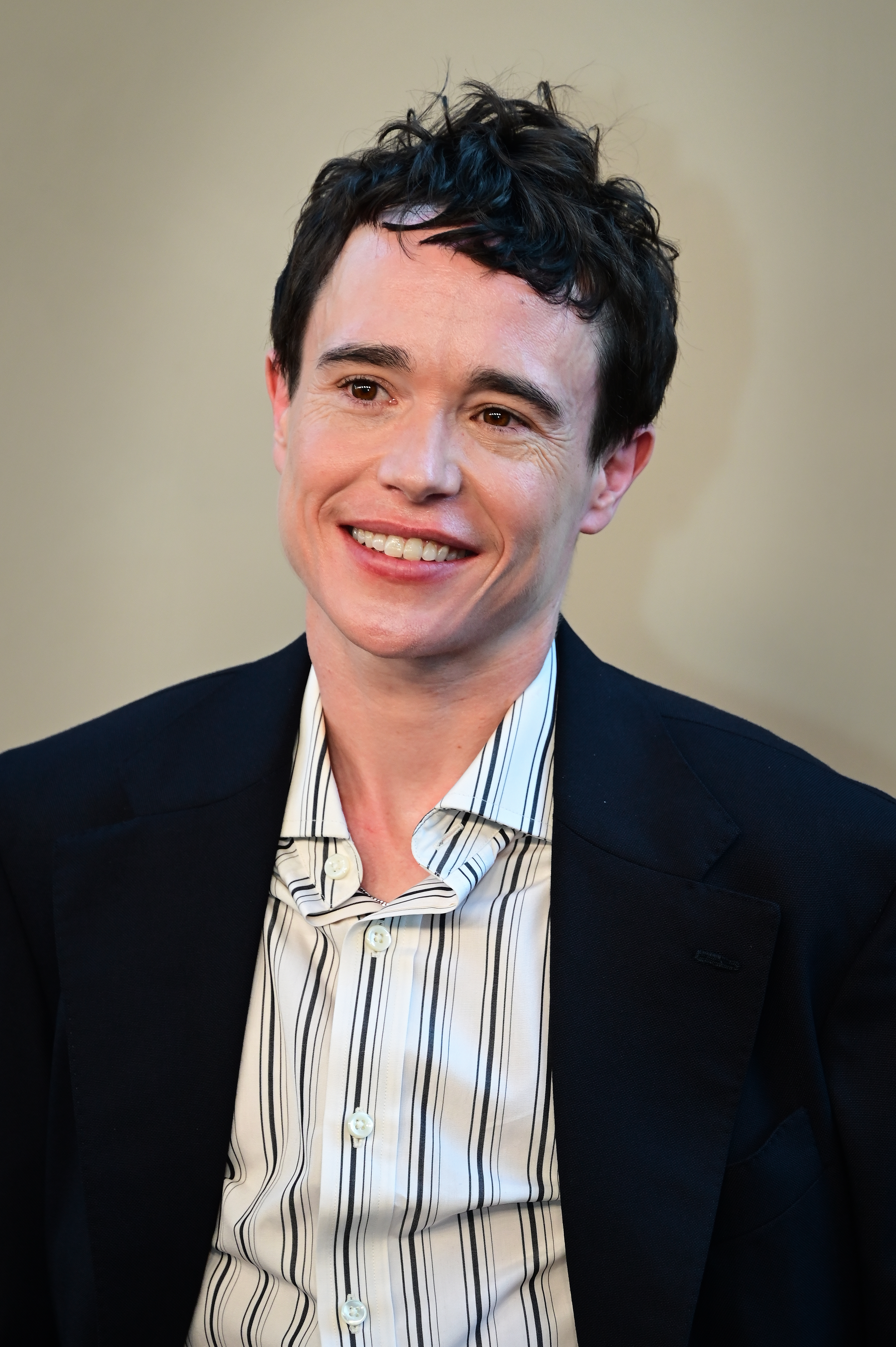
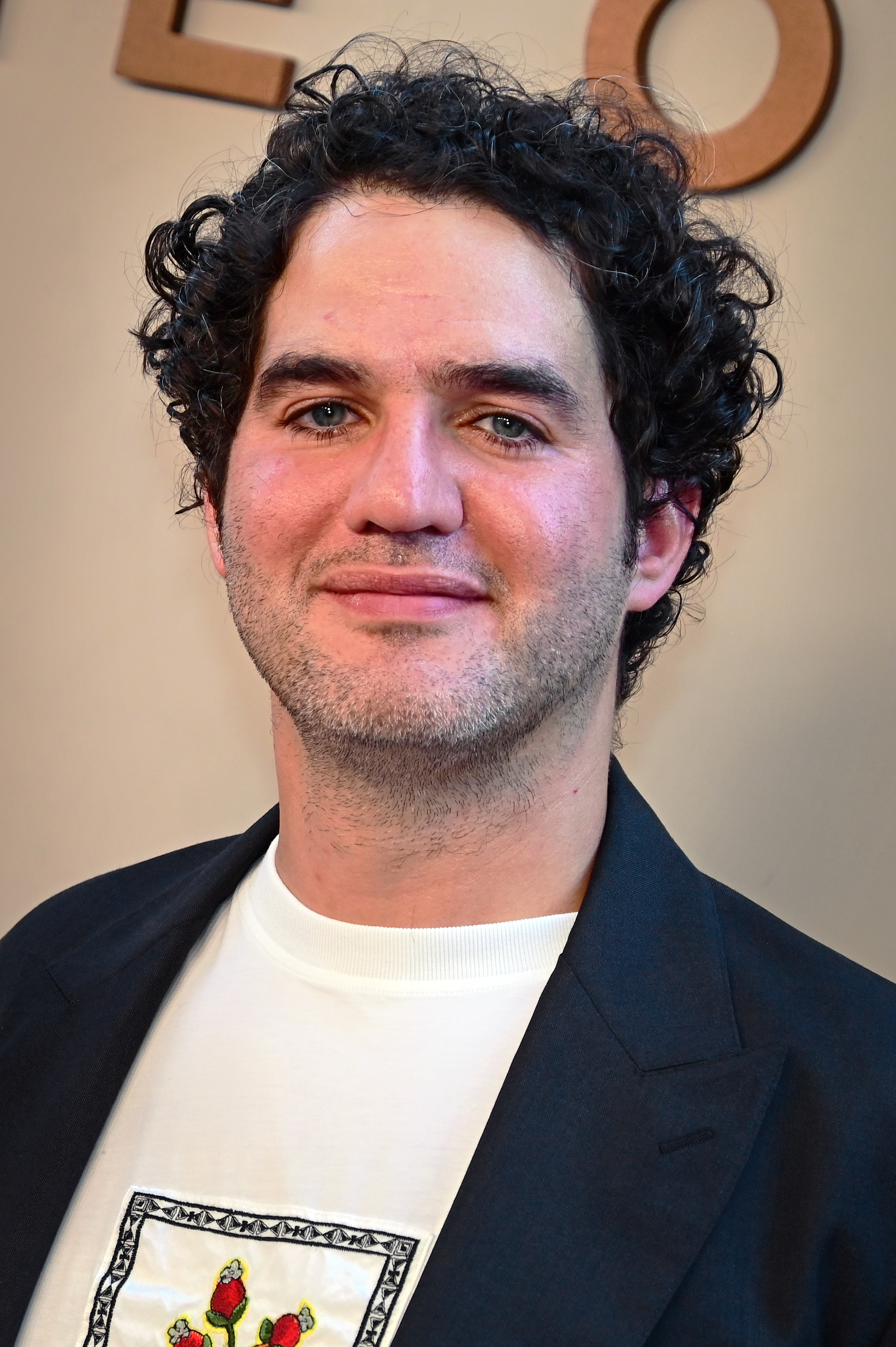
The ensemble cast of The Odyssey at the premiere in New York City: Matt Damon, Tom Holland, Anne Hathaway, Lupita Nyong'o, Samantha Morton, John Leguizamo, Zendaya, Charlize Theron, Jon Bernthal, Himesh Patel, Elliot Page, and Benny Safdie.
- Matt Damon as Odysseus, the Greek king of Ithaca. Director Christopher Nolan described Odysseus as complicated, "an amazing strategist, [and] a very wily person".
- Tom Holland as Telemachus, Odysseus and Penelope's son and the prince of Ithaca, who is determined to find his father.
- Anne Hathaway as Penelope, wife of Odysseus, mother of Telemachus, and the queen of Ithaca, who fends off many suitors in her husband's absence.
- Robert Pattinson as Antinous, a suitor of Penelope, whom Pattinson described as sleazy and likened to James Woods's character Lester Diamond from the 1995 film Casino.
- Lupita Nyong'o in a dual role as:
  - Helen of Troy, wife of Menelaus, described as the most beautiful woman in the world, whose abduction triggers the Trojan War.
  - Clytemnestra, Helen's twin half-sister, wife of Agamemnon, who murders him upon his return from Troy.
- Samantha Morton as Circe, a witch and goddess on the island of Aeaea.
- John Leguizamo as Eumaeus, a blind swineherd, Odysseus's faithful slave.
- Zendaya as Athena, the goddess of wisdom, warfare, and handicraft, who protects Odysseus on his journey. She also portrays the young Trojan priestess of Athena who is killed during the sack of Troy and whose form Athena later takes.
- Charlize Theron as Calypso, a nymph on the island of Ogygia who tries to entice Odysseus to live as her husband with the promise of immortality.
- Jon Bernthal as Menelaus, the king of Sparta and Helen's husband.
- Himesh Patel as Eurylochus, Odysseus's second-in-command who challenges his thoughts and plans.
- Bill Irwin as the on-set performer of Polyphemus, a Cyclops and son of Poseidon.
- Elliot Page as Sinon, a Greek soldier and the son of a slave of Antinous, who was recruited as a child to be raised to serve as a soldier who would reach adulthood upon the Greeks' arrival at Troy. Sinon is not in Homer's original poem and his story was borrowed from Virgil's Aeneid and other myths.
- Benny Safdie as Agamemnon, the Greek king of Mycenae, Clytemnestra's husband, Menelaus's older brother, and the commander of the Greeks during the Trojan War.

Other suitors of Penelope include Corey Hawkins as Polybus, Niko Nicotera as Peisander, Elyes Gabel as Elatus, Iddo Goldberg as Amphimedon, and Jamie Harris as Agelus. Mia Goth and Logan Marshall-Green portray twin siblings Melantho and Melanthius, who are respectively a disloyal maidservant of Odysseus and Penelope and Odysseus's dishonest cowherd. Ryan Hurst portrays Mentor, Telemachus's guide and teacher, while James Remar plays Tiresias, a blind prophet of the Greek underworld. Other members of Odysseus's crew include Will Yun Lee as Anchialus, Jimmy Gonzales as Cepheus, Andrew Howard as Polites, Jovan Adepo as Elpenor, Jesse Garcia as Menetus, Josh Stewart as Antiphates, Sean Avery as Laodamas, Anthony Molinari as Perimedes, Stephen Murphy as Phemius, and Ian Casselberry as Dolios.

Travis Scott makes a cameo appearance as a bard, whom Nolan included because he wanted to allude to how the Odyssey had been retold through oral poetry, which he analogized to rapping, Scott's profession. Rafi Gavron and Shiloh Fernandez briefly appear as Trojans who kill Sinon and encounter the Trojan Horse. Others in minor roles include Kate Fuglei as Eurycleia, a loyal slave and nurse of Odysseus and Penelope; Maurice Compte as the steward of Menelaus; Nick E. Tarabay as the unnamed helmsman of Telemachus' ship; Brian Vernel as Irus, a bandit employed by Antinous to kill Telemachus; and Michael Vlamis as a fellow bandit assisting Irus.

== Production ==
=== Development and writing ===
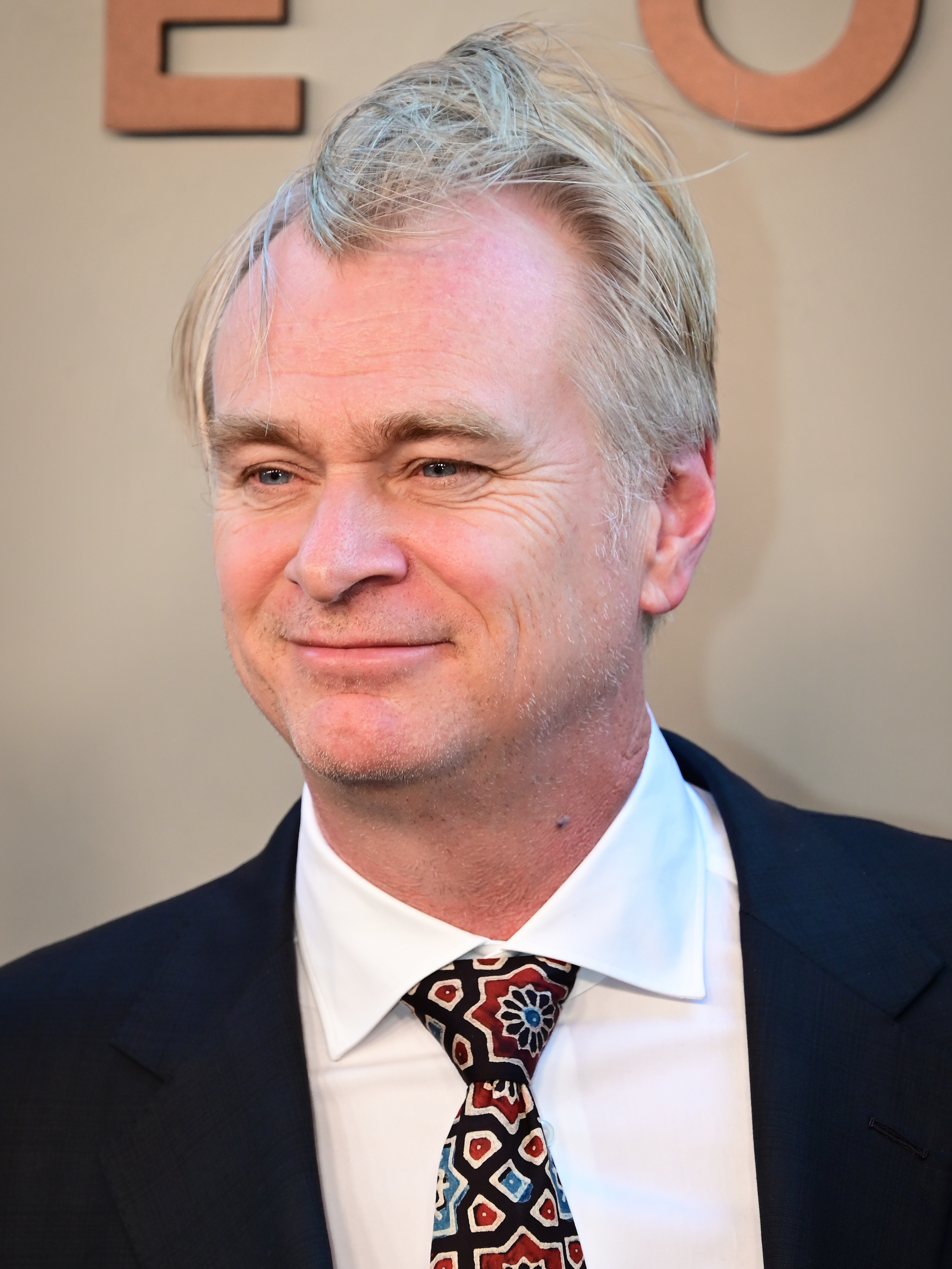
Director, writer, and producer Christopher Nolan at the film's premiere in New York City

By November 2023, director Christopher Nolan had yet to decide what his next film would be after Oppenheimer (2023). While he was receptive to various ideas, he felt he needed to "own it completely". After winning several Academy Awards for Oppenheimer in March 2024, including Best Picture and Best Director, Nolan and Emma Thomas, his wife and producing partner, felt the success provided them the opportunity to explore what Nolan's next film would be. Nolan began writing the script shortly after. Nolan was revealed in October to be developing his next film at Universal Pictures, after working with that studio on Oppenheimer. He was confirmed to be writing the script and producing once again with Thomas through their production company, Syncopy, and filming was scheduled to begin in early 2025. Unlike Oppenheimer, which Universal acquired at auction, The Odyssey was set up at the studio and given a release date of July 17, 2026.

The logline and additional details of its premise were kept largely secret compared to Nolan's previous films, which prompted much speculation about its subject matter. This included rumors that it would either be a vampire period piece, a reboot of the 1983 helicopter action-thriller film Blue Thunder, or an adaptation of the British spy television series The Prisoner (1967–1968), which Nolan was previously attached to in 2009, but all of these were debunked. Nolan later reflected the "disadvantage of never telling people what we're doing" was the invention and circulation of rumors, though he nonetheless enjoyed them. In December 2024, Universal announced Nolan's new film as The Odyssey, an adaptation of Homer's ancient Greek epic poem, the Odyssey. The studio described it as a "mythic action epic" that would be filmed worldwide. Nolan was previously attached to direct Troy (2004)—based on Homer's Odyssey predecessor the Iliad—that Wolfgang Petersen had developed for Warner Bros. Pictures, before Petersen chose to direct Troy and Nolan subsequently made Batman Begins (2005). Nolan believed he was "in a little over [his] head" for Troy, but felt he had become more qualified to adapt the "sweeping story" of the Odyssey after working on several large-scale productions during the following 20 years. The Odyssey was expected to be the most expensive film of Nolan's career with a net budget of $250 million.

Nolan described The Odyssey as the largest and most challenging production of his career due to its scale. He explained that he chose to adapt the Odyssey because it had not been adapted into a large-scale production from a major Hollywood studio, calling it "an odd gap in movie history". Nolan and Thomas described The Odyssey as "foundational" because it incorporates aspects of the horror, mystery, romance, and thriller genres of stories. Nolan also said that The Odyssey had influenced his previous films. He read and studied The Odyssey and several of its translations, including those by classicists Emily Wilson, E. V. Rieu, and Robert Fagles. He wrote the script in a non-linear fashion. While the script was said to be "very faithful" to Homer's text, Nolan made some alterations, such as more prominently featuring Odysseus's faithful dog Argos; more interactions between Odysseus and Telemachus; humanizing the goddess and witch Circe to be unsettling yet sympathetic; and complicating the reunion between Helen of Troy and Spartan king Menelaus. He was interested in portraying Odysseus's cleverness and inventiveness, particularly citing his characterization in Wilson's 2017 translation of the Odyssey.

To combine the Odyssey's fantastical elements with Nolan's use of "tactile realism", the director chose to take a realistic approach in depicting the evidence and actions of the gods through natural phenomena once considered "supernatural" during the story's time period. Nolan called this a major creative breakthrough. Nolan cited Andrei Tarkovsky's Andrei Rublev (1966) and Akira Kurosawa's Ran (1985) as major inspirations, particularly regarding its visual style and atmospheric tone. Nolan also drew inspiration from various Greek mythology–inspired films he watched in his youth, particularly the works of animator and special effects artist Ray Harryhausen. Nolan had considered casting actors to portray Greek gods throwing thunderbolts from Mount Olympus, but found depicting the characters' fear of the gods' actions provided a more immersive experience than outright showing the gods.

=== Casting ===
By October 2024, Matt Damon was in talks to star after collaborating with Nolan on Oppenheimer and Interstellar (2014). Damon was confirmed to star later in October when Tom Holland was cast. Previous Nolan collaborators Anne Hathaway—who starred in The Dark Knight Rises (2012) and Interstellar—and Robert Pattinson, who starred in Tenet (2020), joined the cast in November, alongside Zendaya, Lupita Nyong'o, and Charlize Theron. Damon, Holland, Hathaway, and Pattinson were all set for lead roles, with Nyong'o and Zendaya having supporting roles. Pattinson was the only actor who requested to read the script before signing on.

Further casting took place throughout early 2025, with prior Nolan collaborators Benny Safdie, Elliot Page, Himesh Patel, Bill Irwin, Josh Stewart, Anthony Molinari, and James Remar joining. Patel was quietly offered his part in December 2024. Additional actors cast alongside them were Jon Bernthal, John Leguizamo, Samantha Morton, Jesse Garcia, Will Yun Lee, Rafi Gavron, Shiloh Fernandez, Mia Goth, Corey Hawkins, Nick E. Tarabay, Jimmy Gonzales, Maurice Compte, Michael Vlamis, Iddo Goldberg, Ryan Hurst, Jovan Adepo, and Sean Avery. Cosmo Jarvis had also been cast, but dropped out shortly before filming began due to a scheduling conflict and was subsequently replaced by Logan Marshall-Green. Marshall-Green initially self-taped in December, and was offered a callback in January which he declined; two months later, he was offered the role when Jarvis dropped out. Skeet Ulrich said he unsuccessfully read for a role in early February alongside two other actors.

Universal confirmed that Damon was portraying Odysseus in the middle of February, ahead of the start of filming later that month. This came after some rumors had circulated that Holland could be playing the role; Holland was later confirmed to be portraying Odysseus's son, Telemachus. To prepare for his role, Damon underwent an extensive training regimen and a strict diet to become "lean but strong", which included no longer consuming gluten and reducing his weight to 167 pounds (76 kilograms). He also grew a full beard for a year, after Nolan declined to use artificial facial hair because he wanted to capture "the physicality of real hair".

=== Design and special effects ===
Production designer Ruth De Jong and costume designer Ellen Mirojnick returned to work with Nolan from Oppenheimer. Mirojnick discussed her emphasis "on tactility—giving every piece of linen, leather, armour and sandal the texture and dimensions of lived history." Her costume design extended to the Mycenaean Greece costumes for both kings and soldiers, and the draping costumes of both Athena and Calypso. De Jong designed the sets and ornaments, including the 36 foot (11 metres) tall and 8,800-pound model of the Trojan Horse that was transported in 27 crates to the seashore.

To depict the armor, weapons, and ships, Nolan said that the production thoroughly researched the "very fragmentary archeological records" of the Bronze Age and Ancient Greece during Homer's life. On the production choices, Nolan explained that the "oldest depictions of Homeric characters tend to be depicted in the manner of people living in Homer's time. So there's a pretty strong case there for portraying things that way because that's the way the first audience received the story." Nolan added that Mirojnick sought to convey through the armor worn by Agamemnon that he had an elevated status by using materials more expensive to obtain, such as blackened bronze, silver, and sulfur.

The Cyclops was achieved via a combination of animatronics, puppetry, and an on-set performance by Bill Irwin, with its design taking influence from the Francisco Goya painting Saturn Devouring His Son. The soldiers eaten by the Cyclops were small semi-edible models with an inner skeleton and burstable bags of blood. Likewise, the sequence where Circe transforms Odysseus' crew into pigs was achieved through a combination of animatronics, puppetry, makeup effects and stage magic techniques. Wētā Workshop provided special effects for the production.

=== Filming ===
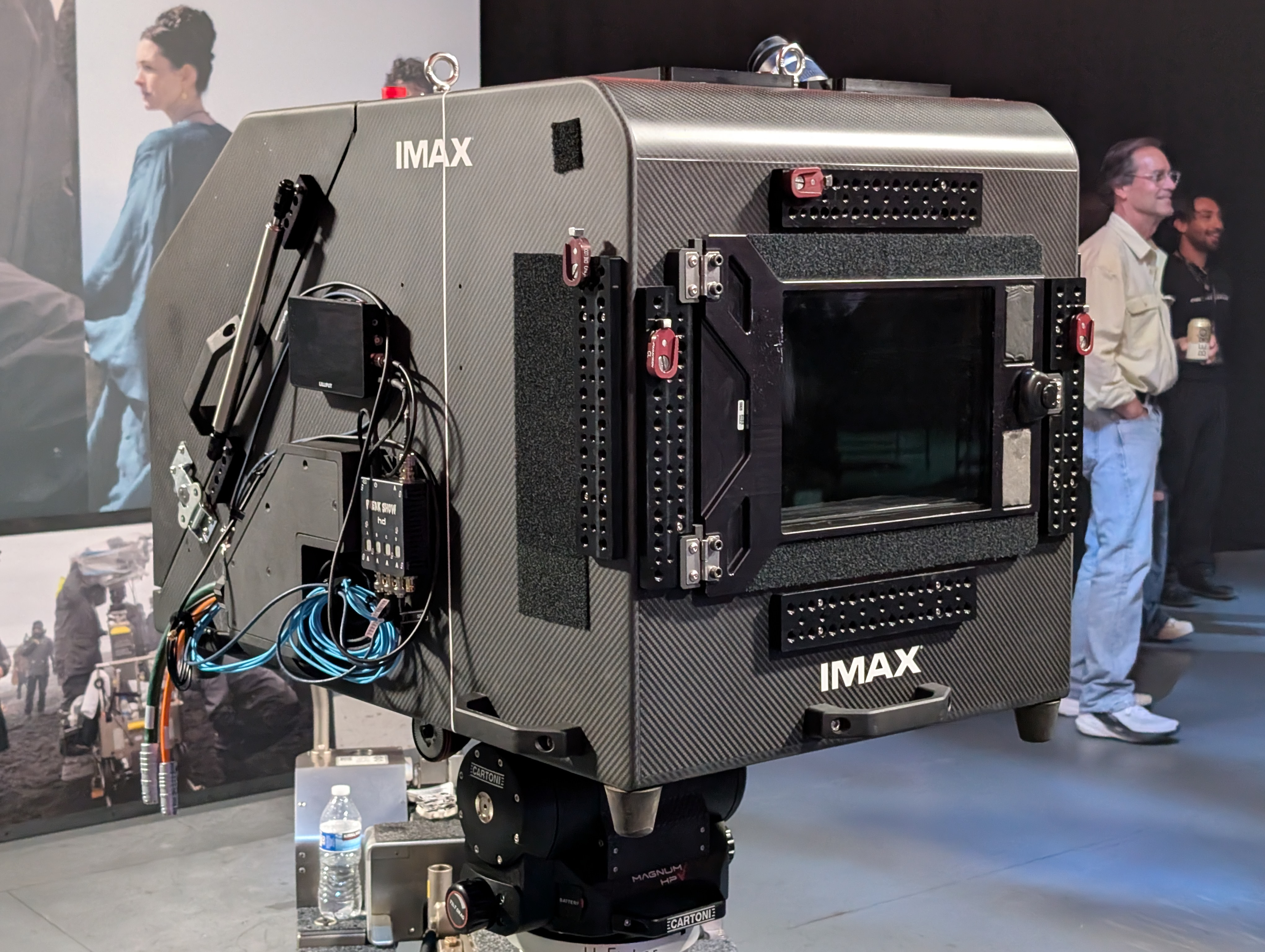
The Odyssey was the first feature film shot entirely on IMAX 70 mm film cameras; a soundproof blimp (pictured) was specially constructed to mute the camera's sound during dialogue scenes.

Principal photography lasted for 91 days between February 25 and August 5, 2025, using the working title Charlie's Tale, and wrapped nine days ahead of schedule. Location shooting primarily took place in six countries: Morocco, Western Sahara, Greece, Italy, Iceland, Scotland, and the United States. Nolan sought to embrace the "physicality of the real world" by filming on location to help inform the storytelling and capture "how hard those journeys would have been for people. And the leap of faith that was being made in an unmapped, uncharted world." The director felt that the shifting weather conditions amplified this practical approach due to the challenges they posed. Hoyte van Hoytema reunited with Nolan as cinematographer.

After using IMAX 70 mm film extensively since The Dark Knight (2008), The Odyssey became the first feature film shot entirely with IMAX film cameras, primarily using a newly manufactured lighter and quieter version Nolan had specifically developed for the production alongside older versions. For close-up scenes requiring audible dialogue, the IMAX cameras were often concealed in large sound blimps on set, while a system of mirrors was set up to help the actors maintain eye contact when the cameras obscured their view. Over 2 million feet (610 kilometres) of IMAX 70 mm film was used to shoot The Odyssey. As a single IMAX camera can only hold roughly three minutes of film, actors had to pause during longer scenes while the camera was reloaded before resuming their performances.

The first scenes were filmed in late February at the Aït Benhaddou village near Ouarzazate, Morocco, to depict the city of Troy at the end of the Trojan War in an appetizer sequence before the bulk of The Odyssey, as well as in the cities of Essaouira and Marrakesh. Van Hoytema rigged numerous portable LEDs to emulate the specific firelight color temperature for the midnight raid of Troy, allowing Nolan to film in any direction. Filming took place in the Messenia unit of the Peloponnese region in Greece, from March 10 to 21, at Pylos, the Methoni Castle, the Almyrolakkos beach in Yialova, and Nestor's Cave in the Voidokilia beach for scenes featuring the Cyclops Polyphemus, as well as at an archaeological palace site in Acrocorinth, Corinth. The production partnered with Faliro House Productions's NAF subsidiary for filming in Greece, which lasted three weeks. The production received over €6.5 million ($7.5 million) in funding from Greece's Hellenic Film and Audiovisual Center S.A. (Creative Greece), as part of its approximate €140 million ($160 million) investment in over 200 local and international productions, as well as a 40% cash rebate.

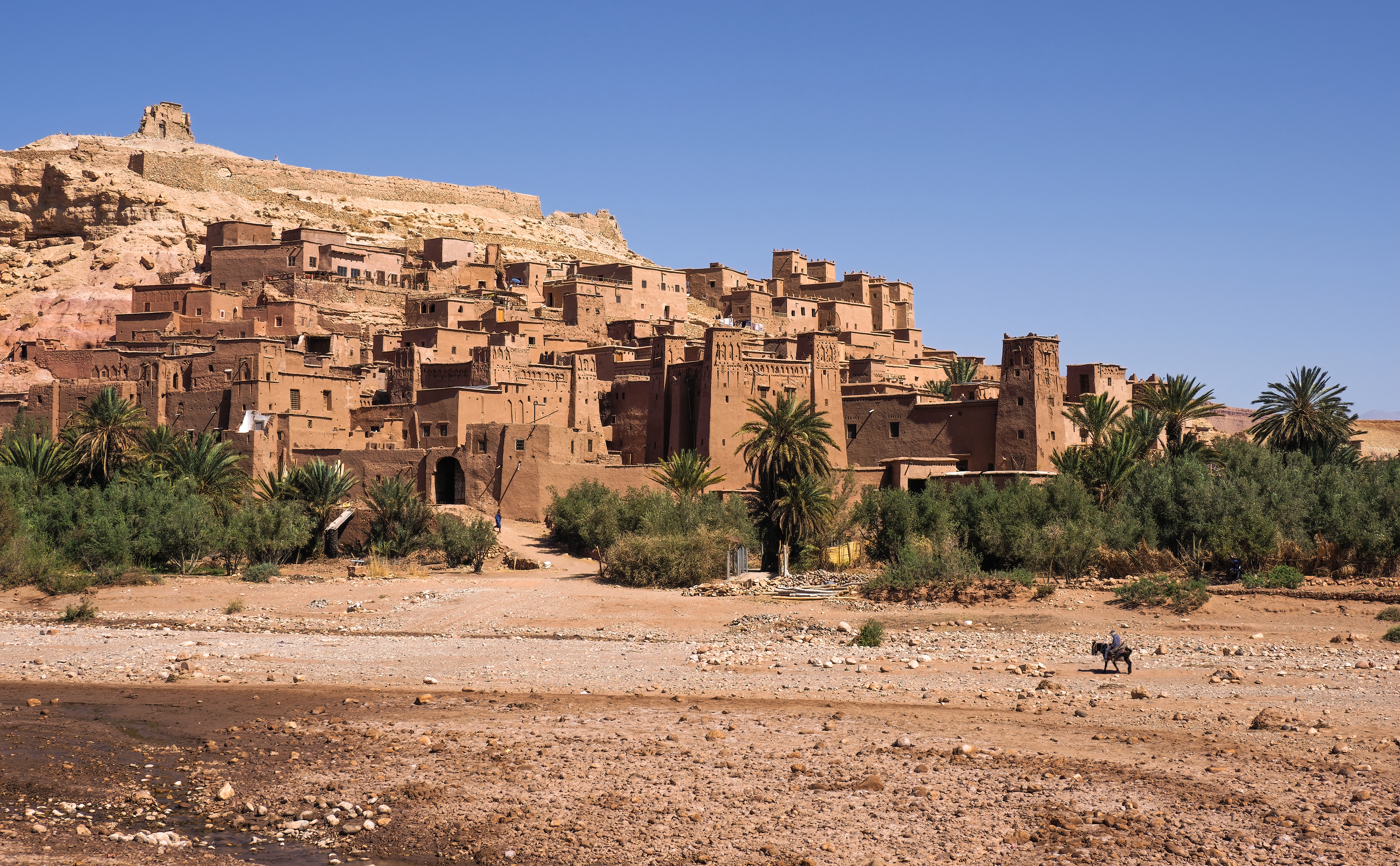
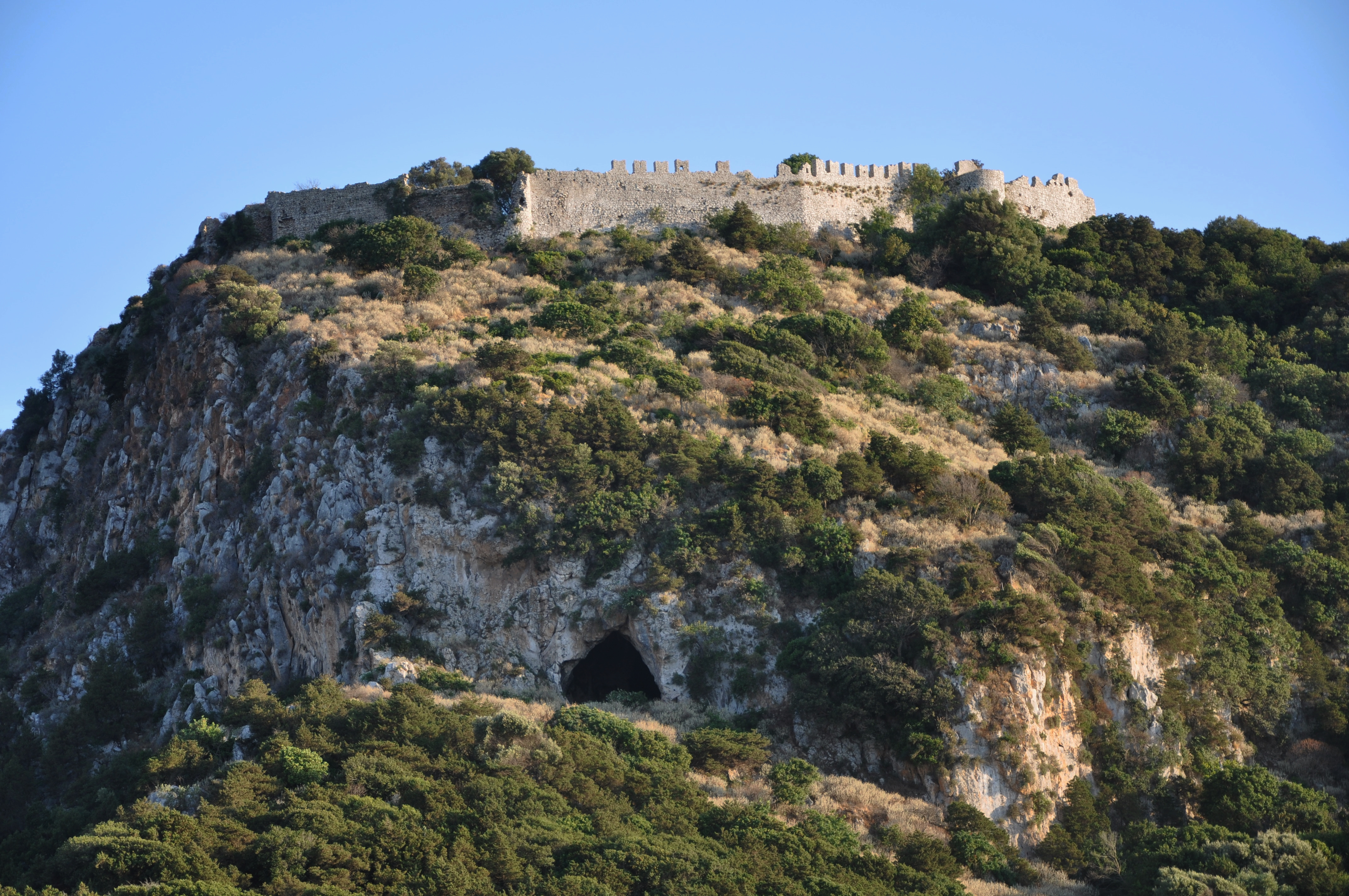
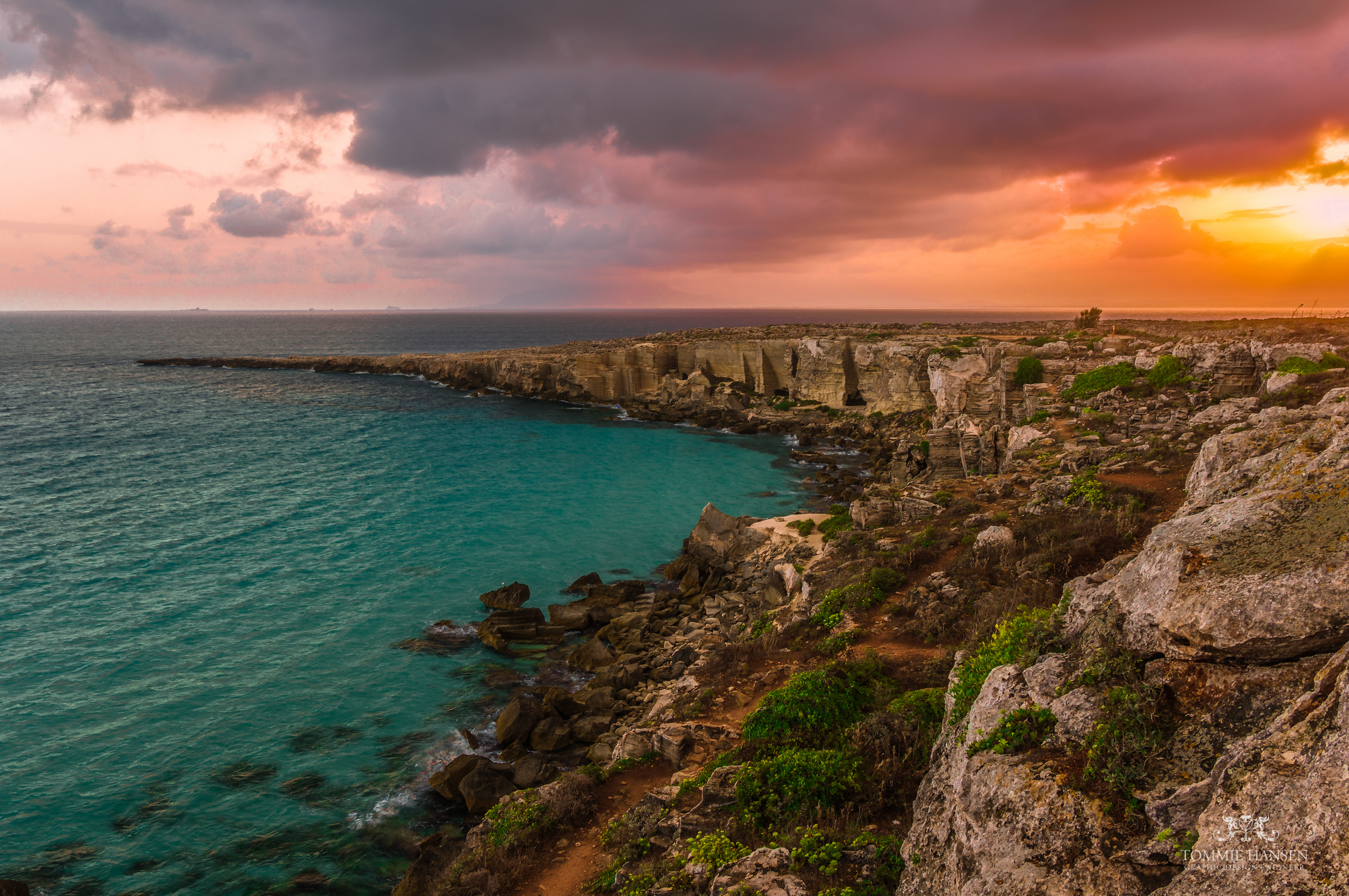
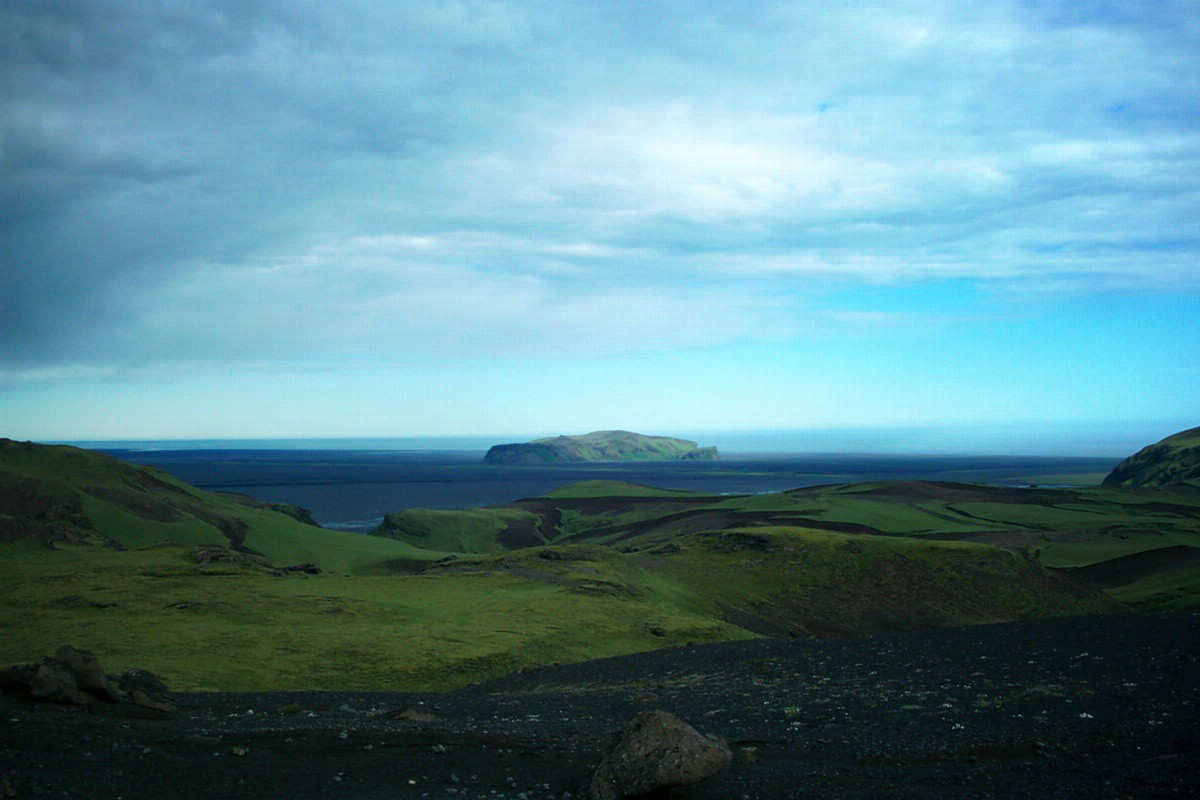
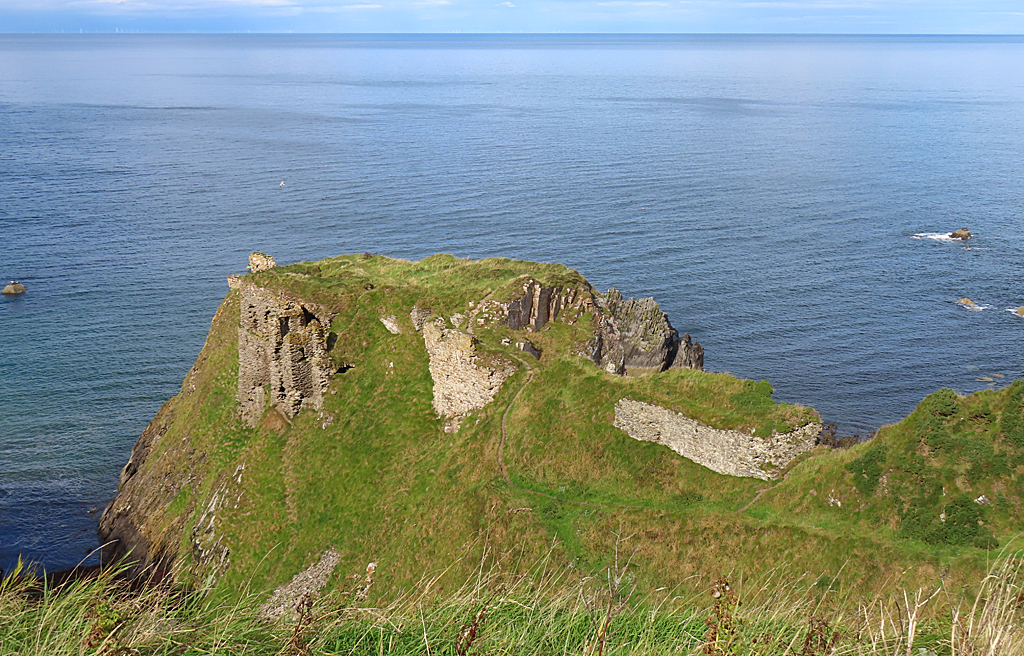
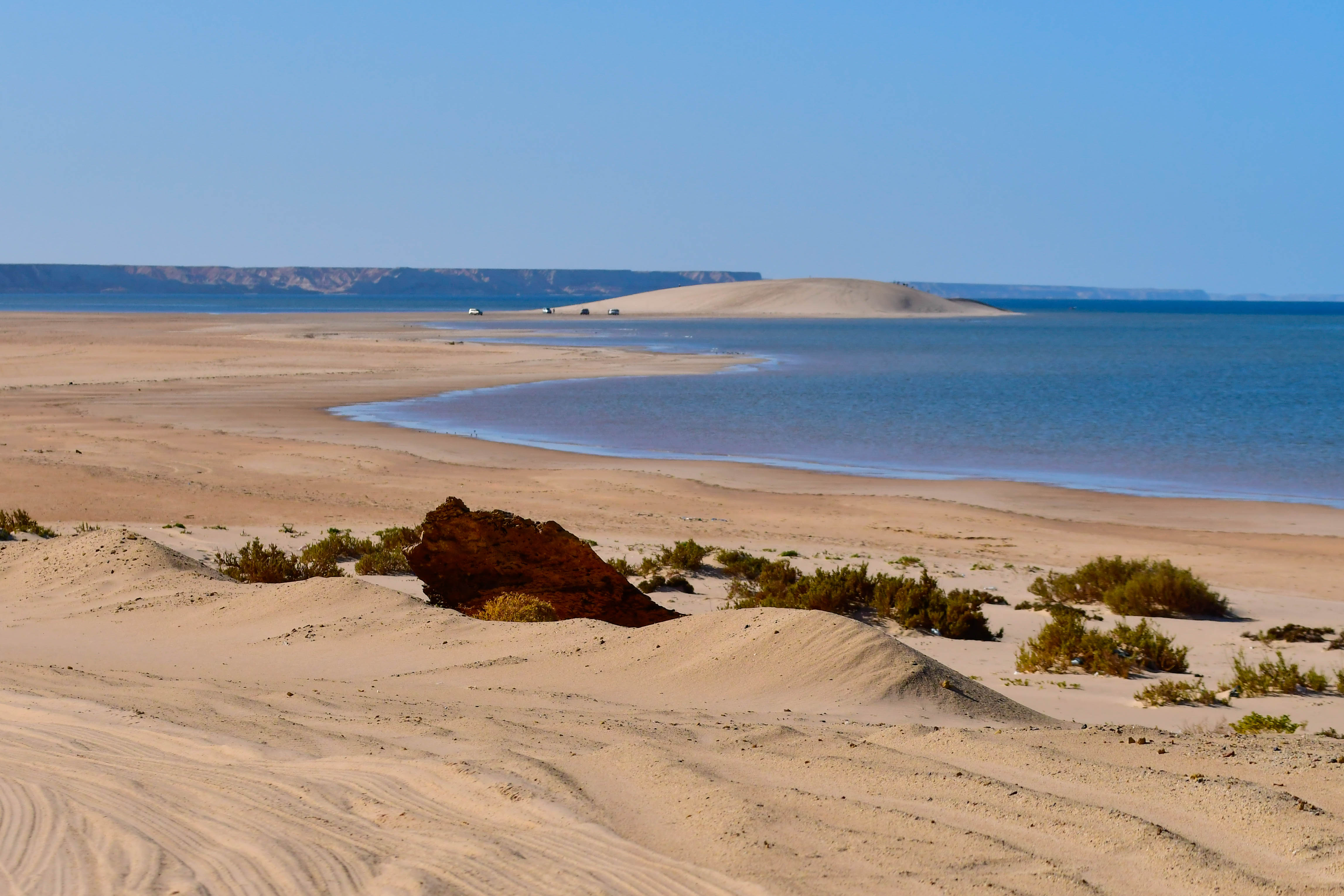
The Odyssey was filmed in six different countries, particularly on location at the Aït Benhaddou village in Morocco, the Voidokilia beach in Greece, the island of Favignana in Italy, the Hjörleifshöfði mountain in Iceland, Findlater Castle in Scotland, and the White Dune near Dakhla, Western Sahara.

By March 27, the production moved to the Aegadian Islands in Sicily, Italy, to film on the island of Favignana, believed to be the location known as the "goat island" in the poem. Castello di Santa Caterina and the surrounding area stood in for the exteriors of Ithaca. Water-borne filming subsequently took place from April 15 to May 15 throughout the Aeolian Islands of Lipari, Basiluzzo, and Vulcano for scenes featuring the mythological island of Aeolia. Filming in these regions was subject to certain safeguarding restrictions from local ordinances, with Fremantle's Italian production company Wildside servicing the shoot. For the maritime sequences, the production used the largest modern Viking longship, the Draken Harald Hårfagre, which doubled as an ancient Greek warship that the actors portraying Odysseus's crew commanded, and was sailed to each of the filming locations. Nolan described filming at sea as a particularly primal experience.

The Odyssey filming in Aït Benhaddou, Morocco in March 2025

Halfway through shooting by early May, filming took place at the Falls Lake water tank on the Universal Studios Lot in Los Angeles, the production's only set constructed on a studio sound stage, before shooting at Findlater Castle in Moray, Scotland, in early June. For ten days in late June, the production partnered with Truenorth in remote regions of Iceland, including the harbor Landeyjahöfn, the Hjörleifshöfði mountain, the river Markarfljót, and the Snæfellsnes peninsula, primarily to shoot scenes on their black sand beaches for the Greek underworld of Hades, before returning to Scotland for scenes at the Buckie Harbour along the Moray Firth coast and at the secluded Sunnyside Beach near Cullen, Moray. Filming took place in the Culbin Forest from July 3 to 16, where the giant Laestrygonians were portrayed using a variety of practical techniques including forced perspective, wire work, and having seven-foot tall stuntmen play the giants opposite five-foot tall body doubles for the other members of the cast. Damon's double for the scene was four-foot-six stuntwoman Devyn Dalton, and an image of her from behind appears in one of the film posters. The Laestrygonians are portrayed as having more technologically sophisticated armor and weaponry than anything previously encountered by Odysseus to emphasize the brutality of the encounter and test his leadership. Filming returned to Findlater Castle through July 25, with Theron filming her scenes during the last two weeks in July. Some filming also took place in Malta for Calypso's Cave, before concluding back at the Universal lot for most of the last week of filming. Filming was reportedly set to occur in Ireland and the United Kingdom.

Filming took place between July 17 and 22, with Damon and Zendaya, at the White Dune near Dakhla, Western Sahara, a territory under Moroccan occupation since 1975. The UN-recognized Polisario Front and organizers of the Sahara International Film Festival decried the decision to film in Western Sahara as whitewashing Morocco's colonialism. The festival's organizers called for the production to be halted, but filming in the territory had already concluded. They subsequently released a statement calling on Nolan to obtain consent from "the legal representatives of the Sahrawi people" or otherwise remove the scenes shot in Dakhla. This statement was signed by several prominent figures, including Spanish actors Carlos and Javier Bardem, Luis Tosar, Carolina Yuste, and Juan Diego Botto, Spanish filmmakers Rodrigo Sorogoyen and Icíar Bollaín, and Sahrawi human rights defender Elghalia Djimi. Meanwhile, the Moroccan Cinematographic Center called The Odyssey an important production to promote the Moroccan film industry and said that it was the first major American film to be filmed in that territory.

=== Editing and visual effects ===
Over 2 million feet of 15-perf 65mm negative film stock shot for The Odyssey was developed and processed at FotoKem in Burbank, the last film laboratory producing 70mm prints. The cost of the film stock alone totaled roughly $3 million. The film stock was scanned and converted into high-resolution digital files for editor Jennifer Lame to make initial cuts. The film negative would then be cut and spliced by hand. Color grading was done through the analog method of color filters on a light table with numerical values assigned to each shot for the final print.

DNEG provided the visual effects for The Odyssey, with Andrew Jackson serving as visual effects supervisor and editor Jennifer Lame returning from previous Nolan productions. Unlike the Cyclops and Laestrygonians, the six headed Scylla was a predominantly digital effect, with Nolan stating the creature was inspired by the works of Guillermo del Toro, saying, "What I learned from him is that a monster is not a monster. You have to approach them the way you approach any other character." A ratchet system was devised to lift stunt performers into the air for the Scylla's attack, while the nearby whirlpool was created by having jet skis ride in circles as reference material to be replaced later by digital effects.

== Music ==
By April 2025, Ludwig Göransson was composing the musical score for The Odyssey after previously working with Nolan on Tenet and Oppenheimer. Nolan wanted to avoid the typical orchestral music commonly heard in other sword-and-sandal films. To "evoke the materiality" and setting of the Bronze Age, Göransson included in the score: various bronze gongs layered with synthesizers; bronze instruments; at Nolan's suggestion, the sound of the ancient lyre for when Odysseus plucks his bow, and the ancient aulos; Albanian iso-polyphony folk chorals and flutes recorded by Albanian shepherds; and cacophonies of sheet metal alarm drums.

Musicians Callum Armstrong and Rosa Fragorapti played replicas of an ancient aulos and lyre. Due to the obsolescence of the instruments, they had to research ancient source material to use them properly. English electronic musician James Blake and American rapper Travis Scott (who appears in the film) also contributed vocals, and the two collaborated with Göransson on an original song, "When I'm Home", which plays over the closing credits. Nolan is credited as a co-writer of the song.

The soundtrack album was released digitally by Universal's Back Lot Music label on July 17, 2026, coinciding with the release date. Record manufacturer Mutant released a triple vinyl LP version of the soundtrack on July 31, 2026, followed by a double album CD release on August 14, 2026.

== Marketing ==
Promotional image which revealed star Matt Damon in costume as Odysseus for the first time. Its design was noted for historical inaccuracies.

Before the start of filming in February 2025, Universal Pictures released a "surprise" first-look still image of Damon in costume as Odysseus. Jen Juneau at People described Damon's side-profile pose as "brooding" and "intimidating". The costume—particularly its Corinthian helmet with a red plume in place of a boar's tusk helmet—was labeled by various commentators and historians as historically inaccurate, both in terms of the armor Odysseus would have worn around the time the Odyssey takes place and of what is described in the Iliad. /Film's Jeremy Mathai felt the image did not provide much insight into the tone or Nolan's approach to the source material, and acknowledged the costume's similarities to ancient Greek attire typically depicted in films. Joe George at Den of Geek felt Nolan paid homage to the New Hollywood films from his childhood, such as The 300 Spartans (1962) and Jason and the Argonauts (1963), especially animator Ray Harryhausen's stop-motion visual effects work on the latter. George said that while Nolan's "decision to veer towards old Hollywood instead of historical accuracy might surprise some", the director's previous films incorporated aspects of his influences while still making each "feel original and of the moment".

In July 2025, one year before The Odyssey's release, a 70-second teaser trailer featuring Holland and Bernthal debuted ahead of screenings for Universal's Jurassic World Rebirth. The teaser leaked online soon after, which Greg Evans at The Independent said sent some fans "into a frenzy" due to its high anticipation. Ryan Britt of Men's Journal believed this was warranted and described the teaser's "haunting nature" as promising "a myth actually brought to life". He highlighted Bernthal's "ominous" narration with a "touch of naturalism and realism", noting that Odysseus is talked about more than he is depicted. Vanity Fair's Eléa Guilleminault-Bauer felt the teaser previewed The Odyssey "through suggestion and cleverly elliptical editing". /Film's Rick Stevenson wrote that the teaser continued Nolan's tradition of using an "often cryptic, vibes-first trailer, meant more to tease the mood of the film than to give away much in the way of plot or detail", but also found it to be "fairly substantive" compared to the similar teasers for some of Nolan's previous films. Esther Zuckerman at The New York Times felt the teaser was "coy about revealing too much".

An extended six-minute prologue, showcasing Odysseus and his men using the Trojan Horse at the end of the Trojan War, debuted on December 12, 2025, in front of IMAX 70 mm screenings of Warner Bros. Pictures' films One Battle After Another and Sinners, followed by 20th Century Studios' Avatar: Fire and Ash upon its release on December 19. Tim Robey at The Daily Telegraph felt the prologue was a surprise for some audiences that promised a "gritty, gruelling, and aptly awe-inspiring" adaptation, and compared the "stifling claustrophobia" of being inside the Trojan Horse to sequences of capsized ships in Nolan's film Dunkirk (2017). He said the "immediacy of this sequence as a race against time is very Nolan", yet felt it did not supersede The Dark Knight's bank heist prologue. Variety's Daniel D'Addario compared the prologue to the Trojan Horse itself, describing it as a "carefully wrought" story within a story. He commended the footage for "delicately intercutting" from the chaotic warfare to the "precision of the gears gradually turning in the Trojan wall's door". A two-minute teaser trailer debuted ahead of standard Fire and Ash showings and was released online on December 22. Commentators noted its scope compared to earlier marketing. Edward Segarra at USA Today called the trailer montage "suspenseful", IndieWire's Kate Erbland highlighted the "inherent drama and pain" of Odysseus's journey, while Empire's Ben Travis was impressed by the "wet and wild photography" but questioned the continued absence of supporting cast members Pattinson, Zendaya, Nyong'o, and Theron. The trailer accumulated 121.4 million global views within 24 hours across TikTok (27%), YouTube (26%), Facebook (21%), Instagram (18%), and X (formerly Twitter) (10%), making it the eighth most-viewed trailer of 2025. This surpassed the trailer views for Universal's Wicked: For Good (113 million) and more than doubled the views for the first Oppenheimer trailer during the same time period.

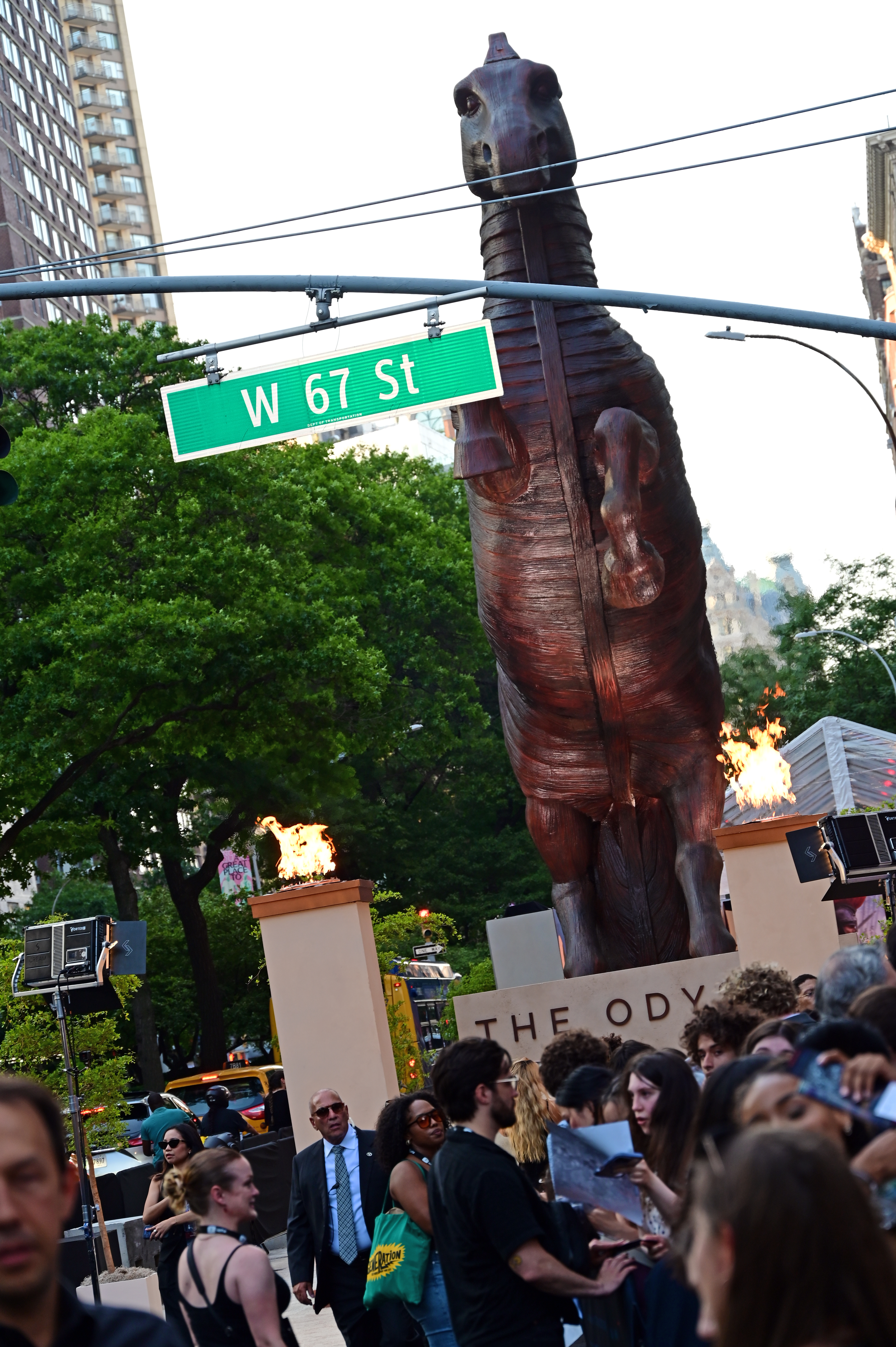
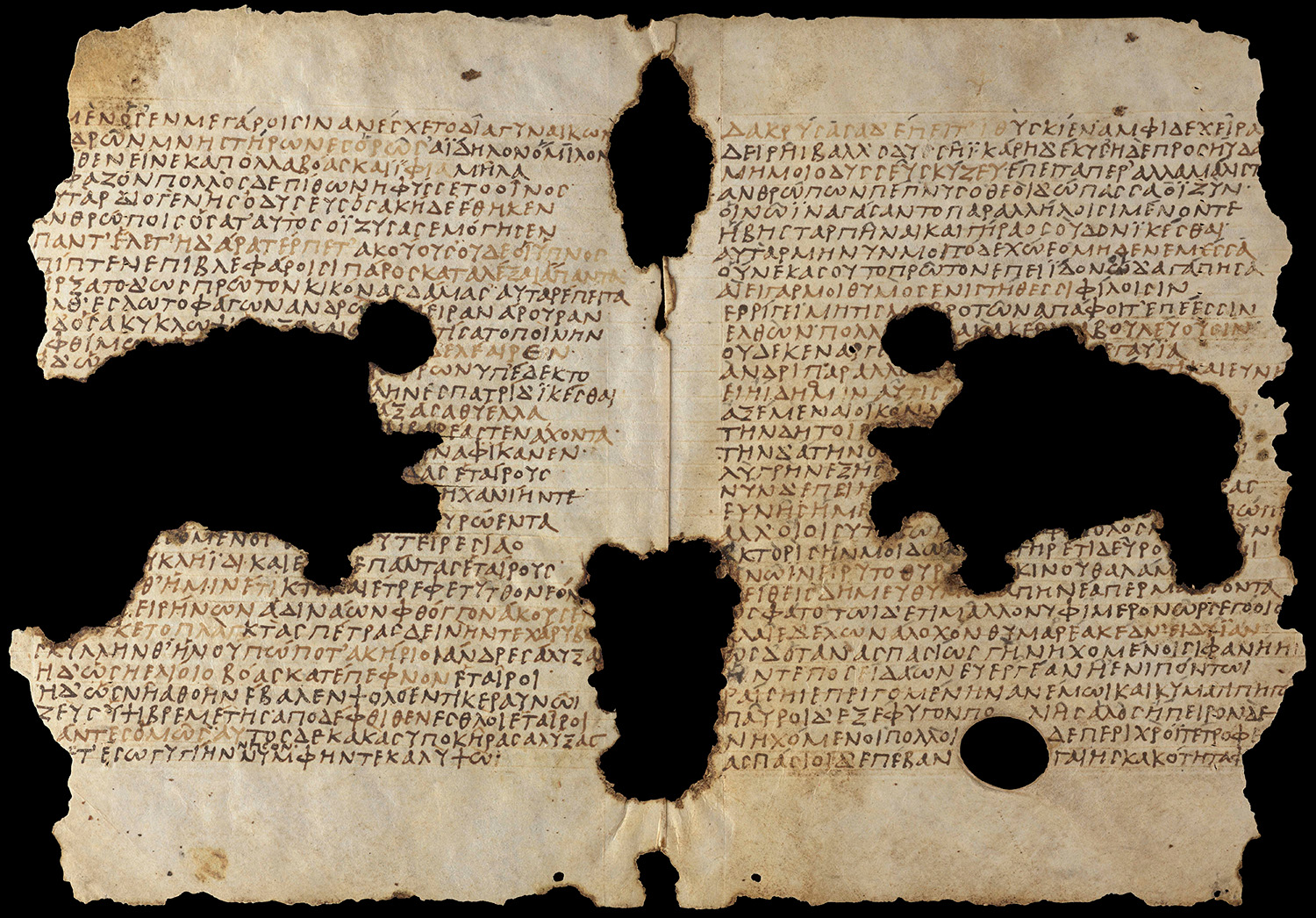
A model of the Trojan Horse (left) on display at the New York City premiere and the Manchester Odyssey (right) exhibited at the John Rylands Research Institute and Library

Universal and NBC Sports coordinated on an advertisement starring Damon to cross-promote the 2026 Winter Olympics and The Odyssey. A short promotional clip debuted during the January 2026 NFL Wild Card playoffs, followed by the full teaser and a shorter version, respectively, airing during the Winter Olympics and the Super Bowl LX pregame show. New footage was included in a minute-long TV spot that aired on January 25, 2026, during the AFC Championship Game between the New England Patriots and the Denver Broncos. This featured a monologue scene with Holland, Bernthal, and rapper Travis Scott, who previously contributed the Tenet theme song "The Plan". Vulture's Bethy Squires felt Scott portraying a bard was fitting because poems such as the Odyssey were historically sung-through. Frazier Tharpe at GQ questioned whether Scott had a prominent role or a "glorified cameo", and called his appearance a "craftily placed" surprise for viewers, especially considering the high viewership of the game during a major North American winter storm. Nolan presented new footage at Universal's CinemaCon panel in April 2026, and debuted a new trailer on The Late Show with Stephen Colbert the next month. James Hibberd of The Hollywood Reporter called it the "most footage-filled trailer yet".

IMAX released an IMAX camera–themed popcorn bucket in movie theaters to coincide with the release, while a Trojan Horse popcorn container was made available at AMC Theatres, Regal Cinemas, and Cinemark Theatres. Gizmodo's Jen Lennon called the IMAX popcorn bucket the "geekiest snack merch ever for film nerds", but said the Trojan Horse container "has it beat in terms of geekiness for literature nerds". Universal partnered with the John Rylands Research Institute and Library in Manchester, England, to have the Manchester Odyssey, the oldest version of the Odyssey, publicly exhibited from July 15. The 1,700-year-old manuscript was displayed in New York and London at press junkets with the cast and crew in the lead-up to the release. Universal also commissioned a 36-foot (11-metre) tall and 8,800-pound replica of the Trojan Horse that was transported and displayed throughout London, alongside another replica throughout the United States and in Venice, while the original model used during filming was displayed at Universal CityWalk Hollywood in Los Angeles. Universal and Syncopy partnered with publisher Insight Editions on two companion books written by James Mottram, Filming The Odyssey: Inside the Making of Christopher Nolan's Modern Epic and The World of the Odyssey: A Visual Journey, for release in August and September, respectively. Filming The Odyssey explores the behind-the-scenes technical production aspects through interviews with the cast and crew, as well as on-set photographs, concept art, and research material. It also features a foreword by Damon and a variant cover available at Barnes & Noble. The World of the Odyssey features character profiles and explanatory elements for locations, items, and events, along with quotes from the cast and crew.

== Release ==
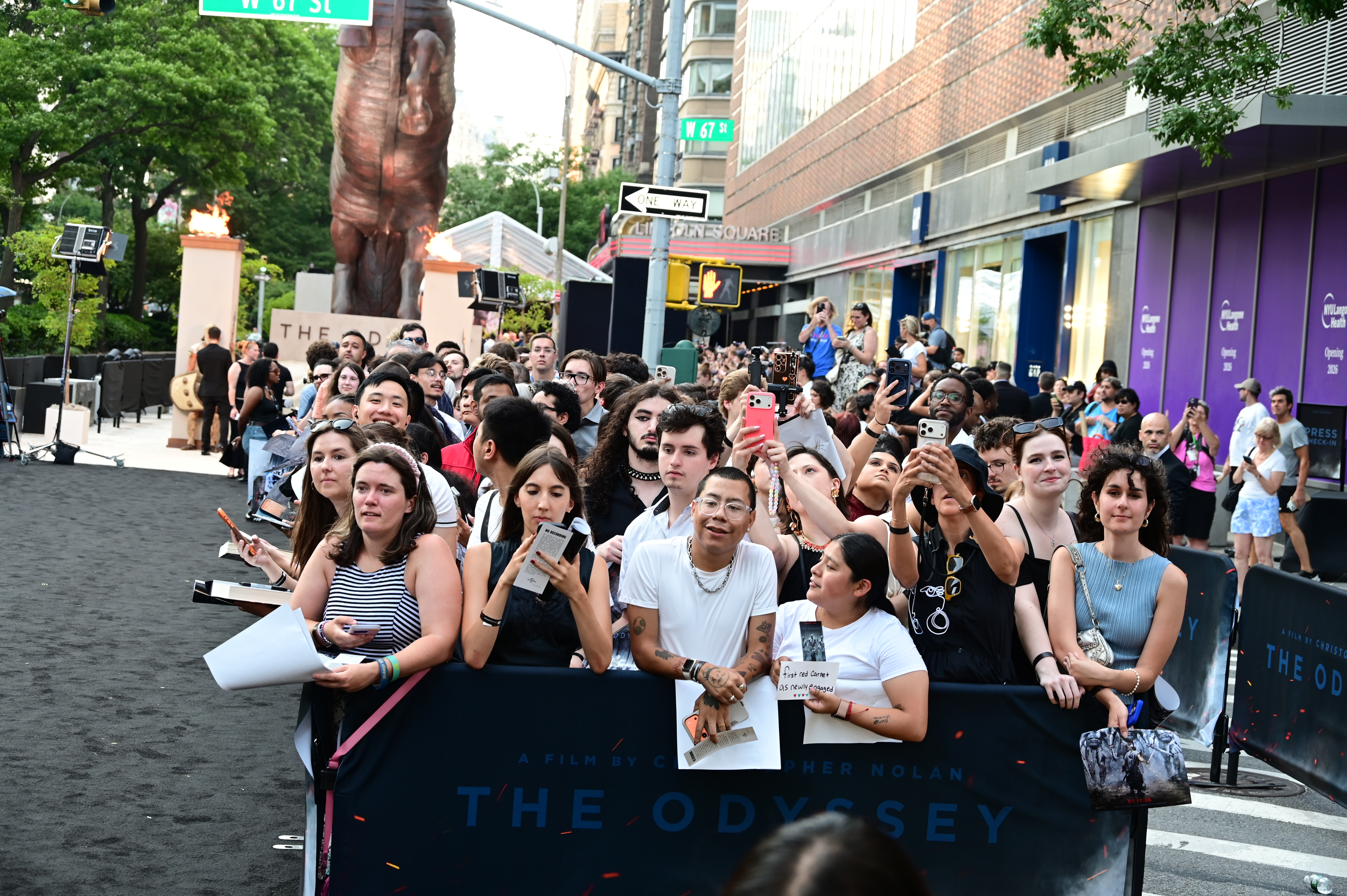
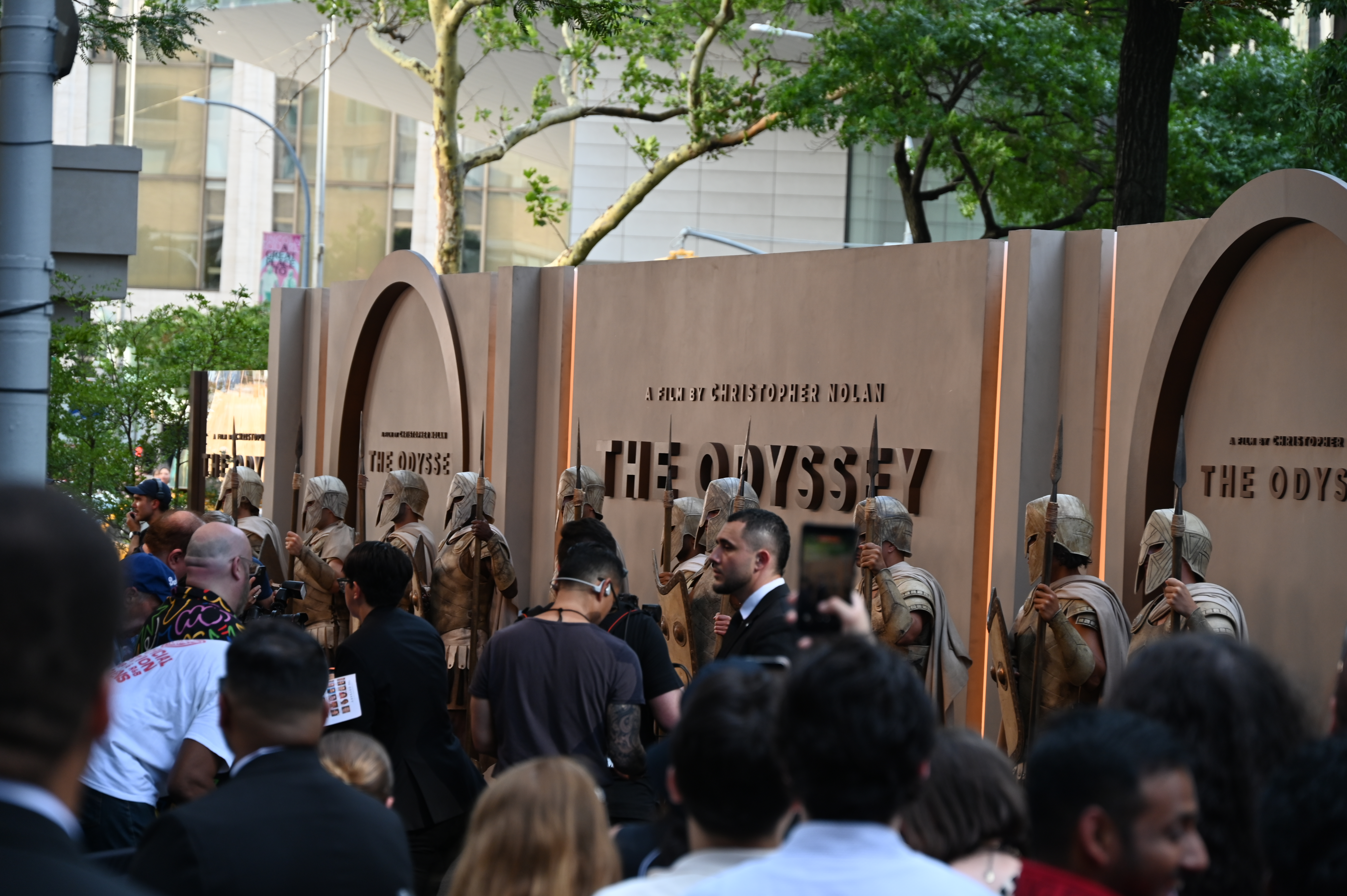
A crowd of fans and individuals dressed in Trojan armor attending the premiere of The Odyssey in New York City

=== Theatrical ===
The Odyssey held its world premiere on July 6, 2026, at the Odeon Luxe Leicester Square in London. As part of the global promotional tour, a two-day promotional showcase and official premiere event was held from July 10 to 11, 2026, in Mumbai, marking the first time a film directed by Christopher Nolan held an official premiere event in India. Another premiere was held on July 14, 2026, at the AMC Theatres venue on Lincoln Square in New York City.

The Odyssey was released theatrically by Universal Pictures on July 17, 2026, in the United States and the United Kingdom. It has been presented in a variety of aspect ratios depending on the exhibition format: 1.43:1 on IMAX 70 mm film prints, 1.90:1 on IMAX digital screens, 2.20:1 on 70 mm film prints, 2.39:1 on 35 mm prints, and either 2.39:1 or 1.85:1 for other premium large format (PLF) screens, such as D-Box and RX, depending on the specifications of individual auditoriums. Only 41 screens worldwide can present the film in IMAX 70mm, 25 in the United States, 9 in Canada, 3 in the UK, and 1 each in Australia, Belgium, France and the Czech Republic, with the IMAX Melbourne screen in Australia being the only venue in the Southern Hemisphere capable of doing so. This is an increase from the 30 IMAX 70mm prints for Nolan's previous film Oppenheimer, due to an effort from the IMAX Corporation to locate, refurbish and install disused IMAX 70mm projectors, as well as train 60 new projectionists. The Odyssey was released theatrically in China on nearly 800 IMAX screens on August 14, 2026, following early previews beginning on August 1 and 2 in Beijing, Shanghai, Guangzhou and Shenzhen.

=== Home media ===
The Odyssey was available on digital platforms and Ultra HD Blu-ray from November 17, 2026, 120 days after its theatrical release. Presented in a 4K HDR transfer in a 1.78:1 aspect ratio with a DTS-HD MA 5.1 soundtrack, the decision to simultaneously release on UHD Blu-ray and digital has been interpreted as part of Nolan's longstanding proponency for physical media over streaming.

== Reception ==
=== Box office ===
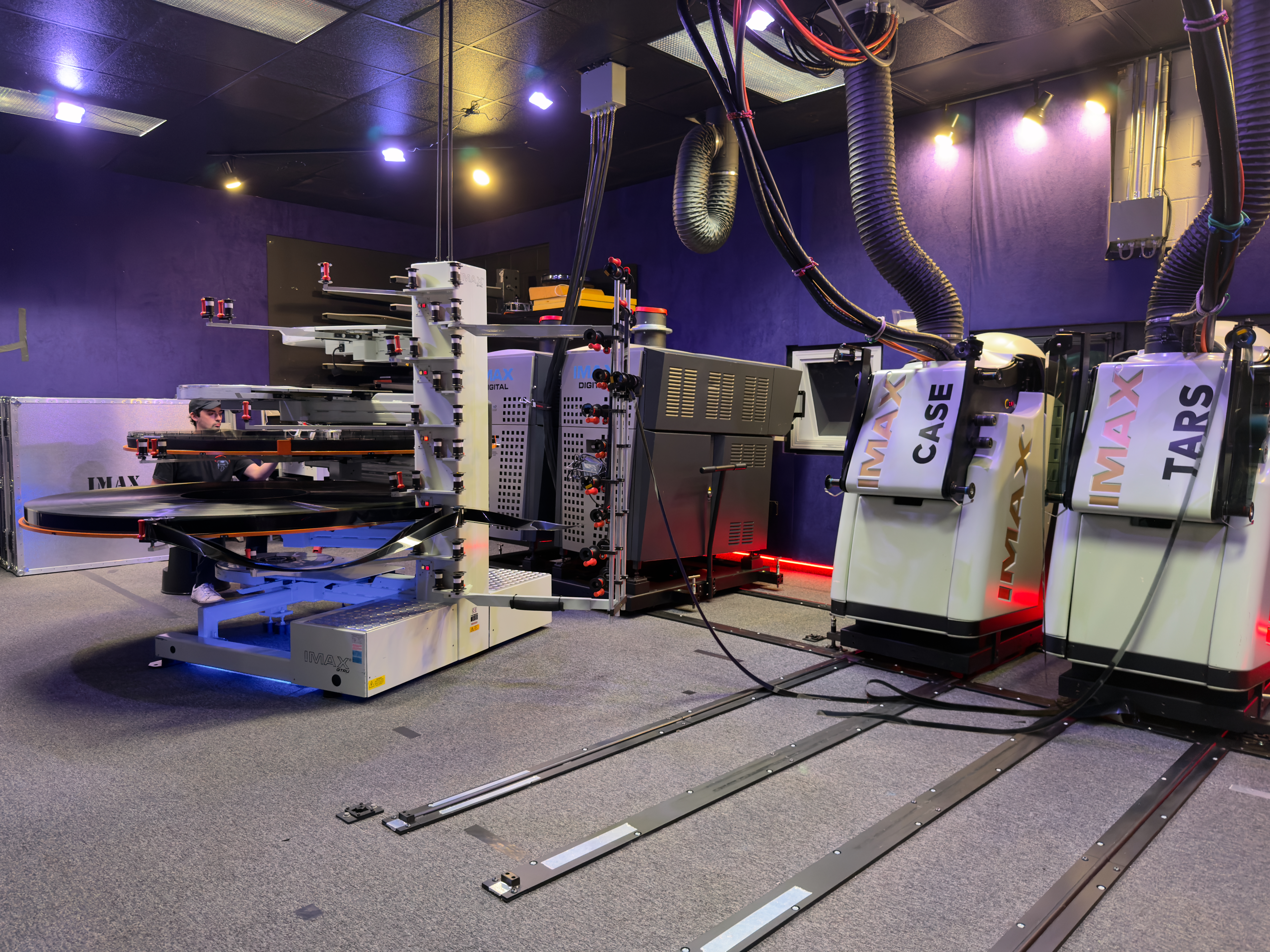
IMAX 70 mm film reels of The Odyssey at a Celebration Cinema in Grand Rapids, Michigan

The Odyssey grossed $626 million in the United States and Canada, and $1.18 billion in other territories, for a worldwide total of $1.805 billion. Produced on a $250 million budget, The Odyssey is among the most expensive of Nolan's career and is one of the most expensive films ever made. The film became Nolan's first to surpass $1 billion since The Dark Knight Rises.

==== Pre-sale ticket records ====
Tickets for select opening weekend IMAX 70 mm screenings were made available on July 17, 2025, one year before its release, which was considered an unprecedented move by a major film distributor. Some of these showings sold out within the first 12 hours of their availability, including half of the 22 theaters available in the United States, earning approximately $1.5 million.

Tickets for the remainder of IMAX, IMAX 70 mm, and premium format screenings went on sale on June 4, 2026, ahead of general admission tickets being made available later that month. Ticketing websites Fandango Media and AMC Theatres experienced delayed queues, with initial wait times lasting up to an hour due to the high influx of users attempting to purchase tickets, comparable to that of the 2023 concert film Taylor Swift: The Eras Tour. Emily St. Martin at the Los Angeles Times described attempts to purchase tickets as "an epic journey of its own". $3.4 million was accumulated from approximately 150,000 pre-sale tickets in the first 24 hours, making it the highest pre-sale gross in four years at that time. The first-day PLF pre-sales were also the highest pre-sales for a major studio release for AMC since 2022, surpassing the first-day pre-sales for any film from 2025 and early 2026. The Odyssey sold 28,000 presale tickets at the BFI IMAX in 24 hours, earning £750,000 ($1 million). This more than doubled the £366,000 ($490,000) gross of the venue's previous record holder, Dune: Part Two (2024), and surpassed the £254,000 ($340,000) gross of Oppenheimer during the same timeframe. Richard Gelfond confirmed that by July 16, 2026, many IMAX venues had already sold out into the film's fifth weekend.

==== Performance ====
In France, The Odyssey opened on July 15, 2026, in 730 theaters and drew 230,000 viewers on its opening day, surpassing the opening of Oppenheimer (160,000 viewers). In the United States and Canada, it earned $51.2 million from its opening day, including $17.6 million from Thursday night previews, which was the highest for any film during that time frame for the year, surpassing Toy Story 5 ($17.5 million). It went on to gross $41.66 million and $31.7 million during its opening weekend, for a total of $123.5 million from 3,919 theaters, ranking first ahead of Moana. This was the best opening for Canada and the United States within a year; the third-best for a Nolan film, behind The Dark Knight Rises ($190.9 million in 2012) and The Dark Knight ($158.4 million in 2008); as well as the highest debut for Damon, surpassing The Bourne Ultimatum ($69.2 million in 2007); an R-rated Universal film, surpassing Fifty Shades of Grey ($85.1 million in 2015) and Oppenheimer ($180 million); and the fourth highest opening for an R-rated film overall after Deadpool & Wolverine ($211.4 million in 2024), Deadpool ($132.4 million in 2016), and Deadpool 2 ($125.5 million in 2018). It achieved the highest live-action opening weekend for a 2026 film, beating Michael ($97.2 million), as well as the third-highest opening weekend of that year, only behind Toy Story 5 ($159.6 million) and The Super Mario Galaxy Movie ($131.2 million). The film also generated the second-highest IMAX opening weekend for the United States and Canada with $29.6 million, after Star Wars: The Force Awakens ($30.1 million in 2015). Within other countries, it debuted to $130.6 million from 12,700 theaters in 73 markets, marking the largest foreign debut for Nolan, with the highest markets including France, Italy, India, Spain, Brazil, the Netherlands, and Poland, as well as the biggest opening for Universal in 11 markets. The film delivered the biggest opening weekend at the BFI IMAX with £219,867 ($296,147), surpassing the previous record gross of £216,454 ($290,979) held by Star Wars: The Last Jedi (2017). The combined opening grosses resulted in a worldwide opening total of $264.1 million, the highest ever for Nolan, surpassing The Dark Knight Rises ($249 million).

In the United States and Canada, The Odyssey earned $90 million from its second weekend, marking the 14th all-time highest second-weekend gross for a film in the region and the second-best second-weekend gross for an R-rated film, behind Deadpool & Wolverine. After the second weekend, The Odyssey has grossed $639.9 million globally, including $286.3 million in the United States and Canada, where it became the highest grossing R-rated film of the year and the second highest grossing R-rated Universal film, behind Oppenheimer. It managed to hold well in its third weekend with $51 million despite being dethroned by Spider-Man: Brand New Day. Originally finishing August 17, IMAX 70mm screenings were extended until September 16, due to high demand selling out screens for seven weeks in a row, sending IMAX stock prices to an all time high. By August 10, The Odyssey had surpassed Avatar (2009) to become the highest-grossing IMAX film, earning $289 million globally, $37.5 million of which came from the 41 IMAX 70mm screens.

Following the commercial success, Greek Prime Minister Kyriakos Mitsotakis congratulated Nolan in a video call, thanking him for promoting ancient Greek culture internationally and for choosing Greece as the principal shooting location. He said productions of this scale serve as a bridge between Greece's cultural heritage and 2020s filmmaking.

=== Critical response ===
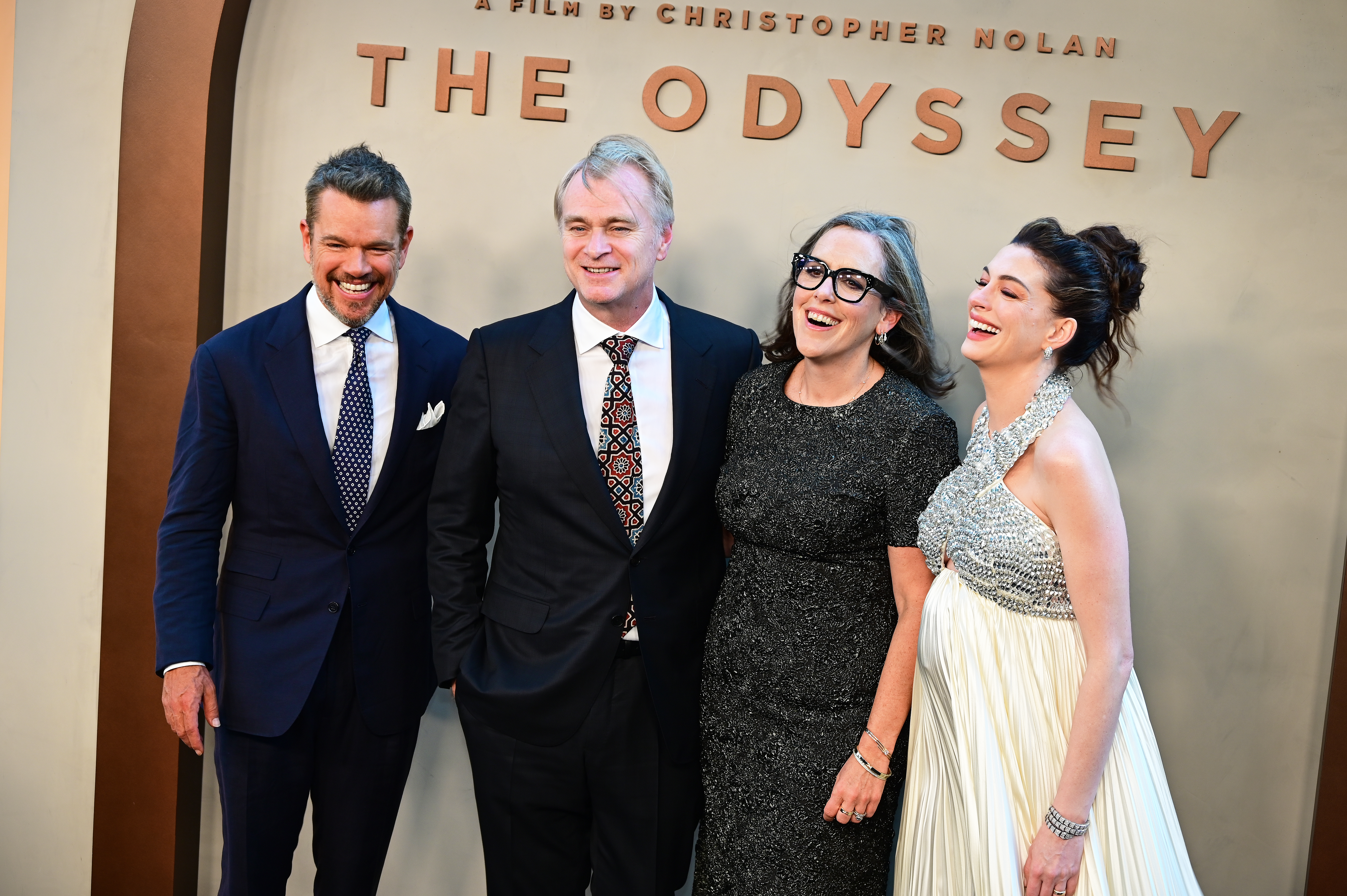
Matt Damon, Christopher Nolan, Emma Thomas, and Anne Hathaway at the film's premiere in New York City

The film received widespread critical acclaim, with praise for the performances, sets, scale, and Nolan's direction. On review aggregation website Rotten Tomatoes, 94% of 517 critics' reviews are positive, with an average rating of 8.7/10. The website's consensus reads: "Reinvigorating an ancient adventure with majestic sweep and sterling work by its colossal ensemble, Christopher Nolan's The Odyssey imbues myth with primal human feeling." It is Nolan's highest-rated film on Rotten Tomatoes. Metacritic, which uses a weighted average, assigned it a score of 88 out of 100, based on 63 critics, indicating "universal acclaim". Audiences polled by CinemaScore gave it an average grade of "A" on an A+ to F scale, while 81% of those surveyed at PostTrak said they would definitely recommend it.

Randy Myers of The Mercury News called The Odyssey "another feather in Nolan's masterpiece cap, a grandiose achievement that fills audiences with the same child-like glee experienced when watching Jason and the Argonauts and Clash of the Titans for the first time". Jake Wilson of The Sydney Morning Herald wrote that Nolan "has a way with a time paradox" and that "he can take one of the oldest stories in Western culture and make it feel new". In The Daily Telegraph, Robbie Collin wrote: "Nolan and his collaborators have constructed a strange, fearsome and trailblazing machine of a movie – by some distance, the best of the year so far." Alistair Harkness of The Scotsman called it "a thrilling, thoughtful, bloody epic", writing that it "feels like Nolan's angriest film" and one of his best. Clarisse Loughrey of The Independent described it as "a blockbuster of literally unprecedented scale", and Nolan's best film. In The New York Times, Manohla Dargis wrote: "It is an anomalous big-studio entertainment that Nolan has filled with stars and polished to a high gleam, turning a 3,000-year-old poem into a smart, thoughtful film with Old Hollywood allure." Justin Chang of The New Yorker praised Nolan's realistic approach and wrote that his rationalism provides "just the note of real-world groundedness that a great fantasy needs to achieve liftoff".

However, there was some criticism for the sound mixing, dialogue, and deviations from its source material. Richard Brody of The New Yorker felt that Nolan "turns an epic poem prosaic". In Time, Stephanie Zacharek called it an "eye-glazing dud". Odie Henderson of The Boston Globe wrote: "Pattinson has fun channeling Roddy McDowall's snarky performance in Cleopatra. But like that epic flop, The Odyssey takes itself too seriously. The film ultimately sinks under its bleakness like a lead balloon." Mohamed Sleiman Labat in The Guardian criticized "the decision to shoot in Moroccan-occupied Western Sahara, where the Indigenous [Sahrawis] people can't tell their stories without fear of imprisonment", and accused Nolan of participating in a "state-sponsored PR campaign designed to legitimise an illegal occupation". Angelica Jade Bastién of Vulture felt The Odyssey was "limited by cinematic sexism" and uninterested in its female characters.

=== Views of Nolan's interpretation of Homer's poem ===
Critics have noted multiple differences between Nolan's and Homer's versions of The Odyssey. Some have questioned whether Nolan accurately depicts Mycenaean Greece; others have argued that Homer's epic was simply a myth, and others again have stated that while The Odyssey is a story, it was rooted in history. The film has been described as both the "most anticipated" and the "most contested" of 2026.

The process of adapting an ancient book-length poem to a single 172-minute film makes changes and omissions inevitable. Nolan cut some plot elements and characters, including several gods, while attempting to preserve an "appropriate tone". He decided to portray Odysseus as a veteran tired of war and haunted by slaughter. That offers a modern explanation for the length of Odysseus's homecoming—that he was avoiding going home. The historian Andrew E. Larsen admired the visuals, but considered the Greek costumes unhistorically drab, and found Agamemnon's armour silly. The classicist Armand D'Angour liked the use of an ancient musical instrument, the aulos. Others critiqued the armour and ship designs. Some critics argued that the adaptation reshaped the poem's ancient moral framework to align with modern attitudes. The casting of the Kenyan-Mexican actress Lupita Nyong'o as Helen of Troy was criticised by conservative American commentators as blackwashing. (Note: Attributed to multiple references:) Several commentators called this criticism racist. (Note: Attributed to multiple references:) Larsen commented that Greek literature accepted the black princess Andromeda as extremely beautiful.

The English classicist Mary Beard criticised The Odyssey as lacking the sex and humour of the poem. She said it failed to capture the poem's nuance and called the character dynamics "feebly handled". Emily Wilson called the film a simple action film lacking "psychological, emotional, political and ethical depth", abysmally written, and with "nothing convincing to say" about the Odyssey's major themes.

Others argued that The Odyssey succeeds on its own terms, creating a popular film matching the expectations of a modern audience. (Note: Attributed to multiple references:) The British critic Peter Bradshaw praised its ambition and scope, offering a vision of grim resolution in the face of loss. Guy Lodge of Variety described it as a "vast, thrilling, slightly aloof epic", offering the audience so much that the chilliness works. For Victor Davis Hanson, Nolan "diminished the dynamic hero Odysseus and the exhilarating age in which he lived" in favor of "a gloomy experience that emphasizes the moral ambiguity, self-absorption, and monotony of our own age."

=== Casting choices ===
The casting of Kenyan-Mexican actress Lupita Nyong'o as Helen of Troy—often described as the most beautiful woman in the world—was criticized by conservative commentators, such as Matt Walsh and Elon Musk, as blackwashing. (Note: Attributed to multiple references:) Several commentators called this criticism racist, (Note: Attributed to multiple references:) comparing it to similar casting criticisms of the docudrama Queen Cleopatra (2023) and the Disney film The Little Mermaid (2023). Referencing Greek professor Dimitris Liantinis, Philip Chrysopoulos of the Greek Reporter acknowledged that Homer described Helen as pale or "white-armed" but noted that he did not describe her in detail, allowing everyone to imagine her for themselves. Salon's CK Smith wrote that the backlash was "selective" and more about social issues over minority representation than fidelity to the source material. Nolan defended Nyong'o's casting, saying he believed she conveyed the "strength and the poise" essential for the role. Nyong'o opted to emphasize Helen's character beyond her appearance, saying, "You can't perform beauty." She added that the cast was meant to be "representative of the world" while "occupying the epic narrative of our time". Writing for The Guardian, Greek film critic Chris Cotonou called this an "honourable intention", but argued that it made the absence of Greek actors "even more glaring", as they are the people "most authentically connected to the source".

The casting of Elliot Page was criticized. Page's role was not initially announced but was rumored to be Achilles. Entertainment Weekly described some of the online backlash as "transphobic memes about Page playing a role that may not even be his".

=== Linguistic register ===
The use of American accents and 21st-century American English dialogue from the cast, including British actors Holland and Pattinson, was also criticized. James Hibberd of The Hollywood Reporter called this decision a "striking departure from the unwritten Hollywood rule of characters in historical epics employing British accents". Hibberd and Nell Geraets at The Sydney Morning Herald contended that using ancient Greek dialects would not be accessible for contemporary audiences, unlike an American accent. This change was perceived as anachronistic for an adaptation of ancient Greek literature, with Geraets noting neither British nor American accents were linguistically authentic to the ancient Greek setting, while Hibberd said using American accents "risks sounding a bit silly at times", unlike the "'just foreign enough'" modern British accent. Nolan insisted on the cast using American accents rather than British or Greek, which IGN's Scott Collura defended, noting that Wilson's translation of the poem similarly translated the text into plain English, quoting her rationale: "Translation always, necessarily, involves interpretation." The accents and everyday-language dialogue were mocked by some online commenters.

=== Accolades ===
Award	Date of ceremony	Category	Recipient(s)	Result	Ref.
Astra Midseason Movie Awards	June 30, 2026	Most Anticipated Film	The Odyssey	Won	
Celebration of Cinema and Television	October 2, 2026	Career Achievement Award	John Leguizamo	Honored	
Grammy Awards	February 7, 2027	Best Score Soundtrack Album for Visual Media	Ludwig Göransson	Pending	
Hochi Film Awards	December 2026	Best International Picture	The Odyssey	Pending	
Hollywood Music in Media Awards	November 18, 2026	Best Original Score – Feature Film	Ludwig Göransson	Won	
Hollywood Music in Media Awards	November 18, 2026	Best Original Song – Feature Film	"When I'm Home" – James Blake, Travis Scott, Ludwig Göransson, and Christopher Nolan	Nominated	
Hollywood Music in Media Awards	November 18, 2026	Music Video	"When I'm Home" – Travis Scott	Nominated	
Nikkan Sports Film Awards	December 27, 2026	Best Foreign Film	The Odyssey	Pending	

== Themes ==
=== Memory, time, and autonomy ===
In discussing the themes with MS NOW, Nolan stated that "There are so many different themes, so many different elements of Homer's original poem that appear in movies and have been the sort of bedrock of Hollywood for so long... It hasn't really been told as a modern film for modern audiences. And so, for a director, that's a pretty thrilling opportunity to try and challenge yourself and try to bring something new to the table." For Daniel Chin, the central themes are its emphasis on the nonlinear experience of time and the exploration of memory in the principal characters, especially of Odysseus and his alternating experience of remembering and forgetting his homeland in Ithaca. In his review for The Gospel Coalition, Brett McCracken saw the central theme as that of human autonomy struggling with divine intervention, writing: "The Odyssey's marketing campaign tagline, 'Defy the gods,' is an extension of this theme (human autonomy). It's not that Nolan dislikes Greek mythology. He seems to appreciate it as a beautiful story that helped build Western civilization. But Damon's version of Odysseus doesn't particularly need the gods. He often feels skeptical of them ('Why can't God [sic] speak in ways we understand?') and puts faith more in himself than in deities."

=== Breakdown of societal norms and decorum ===
Critics interpreted The Odyssey as a reframing of the poem into a meditation on the moral consequences of war and the erosion of the social norms and decorum that underpin civilization. It explores the Greek concept of xenia—the mutual respect between hosts and guests—using it to reframe the Trojan Horse and Odysseus' journey as explorations of post-traumatic stress disorder, war guilt, moral injury, and the breakdown of trust in civic norms, with some interpreting it as a 21st-century political allegory.

== See also ==
- Greek mythology in popular culture
- List of films based on poems
- List of historical films
- Troy, an adaptation of Homer's Iliad, set before the Odyssey – 2004 film by Wolfgang Petersen
- The Return, another contemporary film adapting part of the Odyssey – 2024 film by Uberto Pasolini
- Ulysses, the first feature film adaptation of the Odyssey – 1954 film by Mario Camerini
- List of films based on classical mythology
- List of films set in ancient Greece
- List of IMAX films
