= Manchester Odyssey =

The oldest surviving codex of the Odyssey (c. 300 AD), held at the John Rylands Library

The Manchester Odyssey
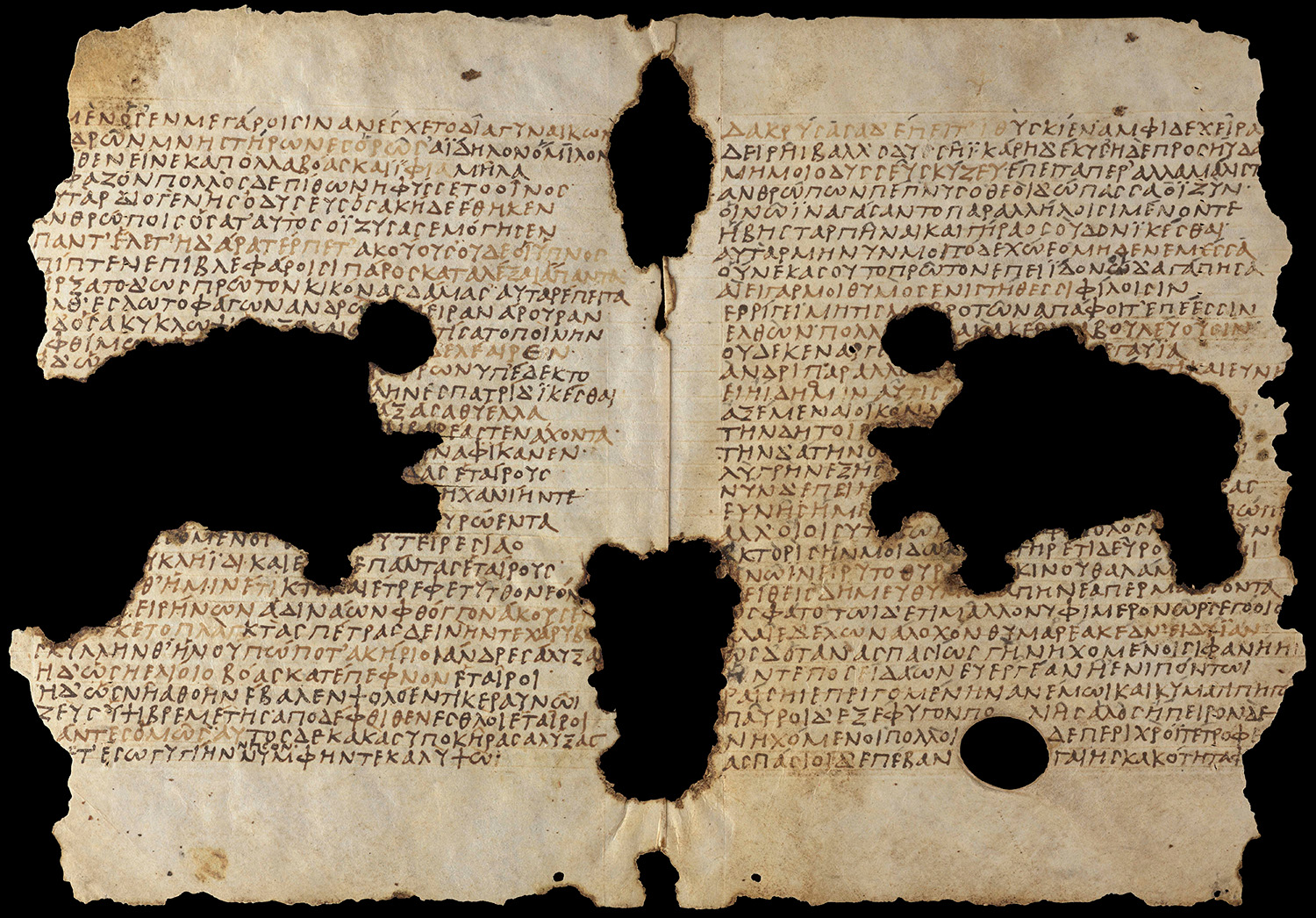
- Folio 90–91
- Type: Codex
- Material: Vellum
- Height: 168 mm (6.6 in)
- Width: 130 mm (5.1 in)
- Writing: Uncial script, Greek
- Created: c. AD 300
- Discovered: Before 1899; Egypt
- Present location: John Rylands Library, Manchester, England
- Identification: Greek P 53; P. Ryl. Gr. I 53; Mertens-Pack 01106.000; Trismegistos 60947
- Culture: Roman Egypt
- www.digitalcollections.manchester.ac.uk/view/MS-GREEK-P-00053/4

The Manchester Odyssey, designated P. Ryl. Gr. I 53, is a codex from Roman Egypt written in Greek that was once a complete manuscript of the Odyssey by Homer. First documented in 1899 in a fragmented state, it is believed to have been written at the beginning of the 4th century AD. Since 1908, it has been a part of the John Rylands Library at the University of Manchester, England, as part of its papyri corpus. It is considered one of the earliest surviving vellum codices in existence, and as such also the oldest surviving book of The Odyssey.

== Provenance ==
The earliest documentation of the papyrus dates to the winter of 1899, as part of an acquisition by British papyrologists Arthur Surridge Hunt and Bernard Pyne Grenfell, famed for their work on documenting the Oxyrhynchus Papyri from 1896 to 1907. They acquired the work for James Lindsay, 26th Earl of Crawford in winter 1899, and two years later, it entered the Rylands collection through the purchase of the Crawford manuscript collection by Enriqueta Augustina Rylands, which was then passed on to the Library in 1908.

Hunt later catalogued the Greek papyri holdings of the Library (including this manuscript) in 1911 in the Catalogue of the Greek Papyri in the John Rylands Library, Manchester Volume I.

== Description ==
Catalogued P. Ryl. Gr. I 53, the codex is made of vellum parchment measuring 16.8 cm × 13.0 cm, and the surviving folio fragments consist of Folios 1–30 and 52–101 in varying conditions, from heavily fragmented to mostly surviving pages with holes in the middle. Quire markings — "κδ" on Folio 79 recto and "κε" on Folio 87 — combined with a standard of 29 lines of text per page, indicate that the manuscript originally consisted of 207 folios. The text is handwritten in Greek, with uncial-style formatting in brown ink with corrections done in black ink.

Overall, the surviving texts consisted of Books XIII–XV, and Books XX–XXIV, with the end of the story being in better condition. In 1900, its owner, Lord Crawford, noted to his librarian, J. P. Edmond, that the centre of the manuscript was rotted away from damp, and that the best practice would be to lay out each leaf between glass plates. Later condition studies by Hunt in 1911 noted that some of the degraded leaves adhered to each other, with "two or three small coagulated lumps that defied treatment".

Conservation work by the National Manuscripts Conservation Trust involved stabilising and re-housing the codex. In addition, digital imaging was utilised to capture both the preserved and degraded portions of the text.

The preservation work coincided with the 2026 release of Christopher Nolan's film The Odyssey, and as part of a collaboration between Universal Pictures and the University of Manchester, the codex was put on display at press junkets in New York and London with the cast and crew, prior to exhibition at the library on 15 July 2026, two days before the world premiere of the film.
