= The Odyssey (1968 miniseries) =

Italian television miniseries

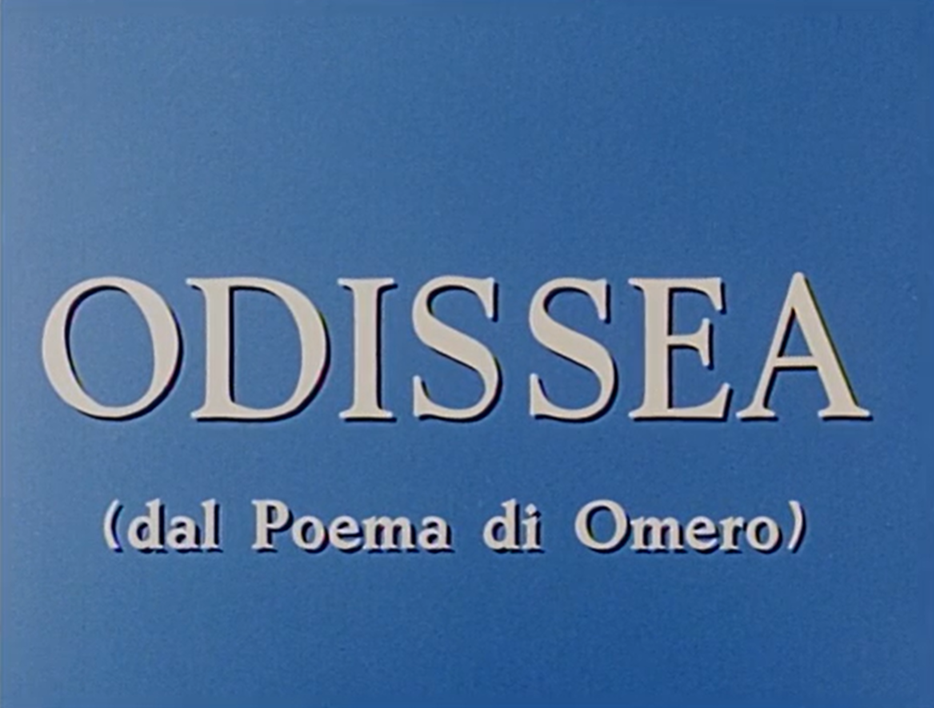
- Original title screen
- Genre: Adventure
- Based on: Odyssey
- Directed by: Franco Rossi; Mario Bava; Piero Schivazappa
- Presented by: Giuseppe Ungaretti
- Starring: Bekim Fehmiu; Irene Papas
- Composer: Carlo Rustichelli
- Country of origin: Italy
- Original language: Italian
- No. of seasons: 1
- No. of episodes: 8

Production
- Executive producer: Vittorio Bonicelli
- Producer: Dino de Laurentiis
- Production locations: Italy; Yugoslavia
- Running time: 446 minutes

Original release
- Network: RAI
- Release: 24 March – 5 May 1968

The Odyssey (Italian: Odissea (dal Poema di Omero)) is an eight-episode Italian TV miniseries broadcast on RAI in 1968 and based on Homer's Odyssey. It is a Radiodiffusion-Télévision Française coproduction, it was directed by Franco Rossi, assisted by Piero Schivazappa and Mario Bava; the cast includes Bekim Fehmiu as Odysseus and Irene Papas as Penelope, Samson Burke as the Cyclops, as well as Barbara Bach as Nausicaa, and Gérard Herter.

== Plot ==
=== First episode: Telemaco and Penelope ===
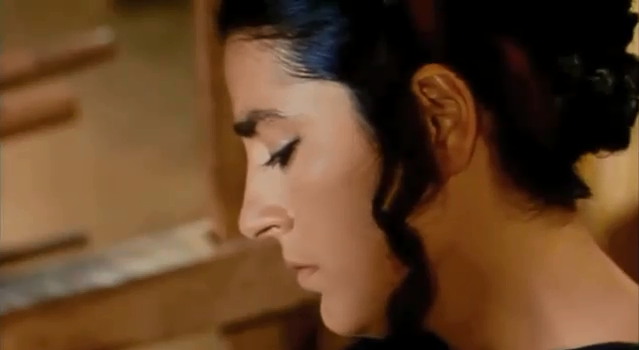
Penelope while weaving the canvas

Athena arrives in Ithaca, disguised as Mentes, to make sure that Odysseus' return is pleasant. Although welcomed with respect by Telemachus, Mentes discovers that the palace of the king of Ithaca is besieged by numerous nobles of the region, the suitors, who wait for Queen Penelope to decide to take a new husband between them, supposing that Odysseus died since twenty years have passed since his departure for Troy, looting without reserve the cellar and the pantry of the palace. Penelope tries to take time by declaring to the suitors that she must weave a shroud for her father-in-law Laertes, but with this pretext, every night she undoes it and starts it again the next morning.

Telemachus announces a town meeting to try to find out who is on his side to be able to chase away the suitors and who is willing to follow him on the land to ask for information about Odysseus to King Nestor, the oldest commander who participated in the war. The suitors also arrive at the assembly, claiming to be right about the king's long absence and the fact that Penelope is spending too much time weaving the shroud. To these answers, the people of Ithaca are silent and dare not oppose, yet the soothsayer Egizio, noting a hawk perched on the battlements of the palace, sees the success of Telemachus' journey, but is derided by the suitors. The next morning, Telemachus is joined by his father's friend and adviser Mentor, who gives him a boat and sailors to get to Pylos. Before leaving, Telemachus asks the nurse Eurycleia not to say anything to Penelope. During the night, Melantho, a young female servant of the palace who is a lover of Eurymachus, betrays Penelope by revealing to the suitors what Penelope does to her shroud at night. Discovered, Penelope is forced to finish the shroud without apology.

The next day, the suitors noticed the absence of Telemachus and discovered, by threatening a boat seller, that he has really left to look for news about his father. Concerned that his research might be successful, Antinous, suggests an ambush of Telemachus. Arriving in Pylos in the middle of a sacrificial ceremony for Poseidon, Telemachus joins the king after the ceremony. Nestor tells Telemachus about the evening before he returned from Troy: there were those who, like Odysseus, wanted to punish the allies of the Trojans and those like Menelaus who wanted to go home; after several discussions, the Achaean fleet separated and Nestor no longer knew about Odysseus, so he advised Telemachus to go to Sparta, to Menelaus, with Pisistratus, who would guide him. Medon, on hearing the suitors, runs to warn Penelope who, after a moment of anger at Eurycleia for not having told her anything, prays for the safety of her son.

At night, Penelope receives in a dream Athena's visit, under the guise of her sister Iftime, who assures her that the gods are watching over her son and also Odysseus. Finally the figure of Odysseus is presented: a lonely man at the head of a miserable raft at the mercy of the waves that move him away from his final destination.

=== Second episode: Odysseus, Nausicaa and Calypso ===
At the beginning of the second episode there is a discussion between Zeus and Athena in which the two agree that Poseidon has tortured Odysseus enough and that it is time for his suffering to end. Odysseus is shipwrecked on an island and, having found a refuge, wanders into a grove of trees and falls asleep on a bed of fallen leaves. The island in which Odysseus arrived is Scheria, governed by the Phaeacians, and Athena appears in a dream to the young princess Nausicaa, in the guise of a friend, telling her that she should prepare herself for her now near marriage and go with the maids to the mouth of the river to do the laundry. The next day Nausicaa goes to the river's mouth and after doing the laundry, the princess starts to play with the maids, when she sees in the bushes a man, naked and caked with salt and leaves. All the girls run away except for Nausicaa, who is staring at the man. Odysseus also remains captivated by the beauty of the girl and compares her to a goddess, then begging her to take him with her to the palace and to help clean him up.

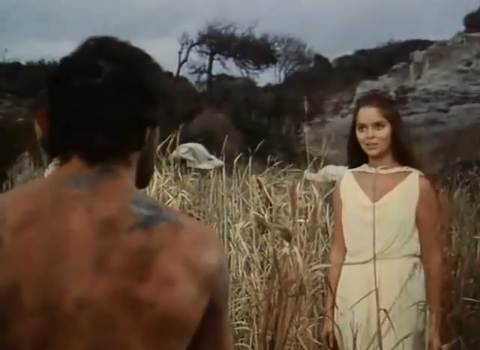
The meeting between Odysseus and Nausicaa

Nausicaa has him washed and dressed by the maids, but she asks that he not follow her to the palace, or the young people would believe she had chosen him as a husband. Accepting the wishes of the girl, Odysseus goes to the city, while an internal voice suggests to him how to behave in front of the sovereigns: Alcinous and Arete. The nobles and monarchs of the palace, suspicious of all the foreigners who come to their land, ask him many questions, only to apologize for their interrogation, after they recognize a good man with nothing to hide. Odysseus pretends to be a shipwrecked traveler in search of protection. Alcinous tells that long ago his people, ruled by his grandfather, resided in the Land of the Cyclops, monstrous and violent beings, who continually threatened their lives; so they decided to move with the help of the gods to a new island, paying the price of being isolated and unknown to any traveler, except Odysseus.

Hosted in the palace, Odysseus knows that the Phaeacians are peaceful and that they know how to build boats that never sink and never get lost, but have stopped building them, worried by a prophecy that Poseidon would punish the Phaeacians by destroying the crew of the ship that accompanies an enemy on board. Odysseus spends a lot of time with Nausicaa, telling her that until a few weeks ago he had been a prisoner in Ogygia for seven years, an islet in which the nymph Calypso resides, to whom Odysseus mentally resisted, until she was finally ordered by the gods to allow him to depart on a raft.

A few days later, Odysseus is invited to see the games that will decree a husband for Nausicaa. The champion asks the guest to participate in the sword contests, but Odysseus refuses, in order not to be recognized, at least until the athletes question his strength, making Odysseus so angry that he not only beats all the other participants, but also nearly kills one. Odysseus asks Alcinous for forgiveness, but Alcinous demands to know his name rather than to hear his apologies.

=== Third episode: the fall of Troy and the island of the Lotus-eaters ===
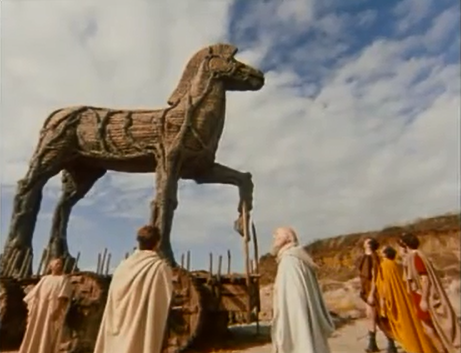
The wooden horse discovered on the shores of Troy

For the victory of the athletes, the blind aedes Demodocus tells everybody the history of the last thing he saw before losing his sight: the fall of Troy. Ten years had passed since the beginning of the war, but neither of the two factions gave up, until one day, the Trojans found the achaean camp deserted and a gigantic wooden horse on the beach. While Priam and many other citizens interpreted it as an offer of the Achaeans to Poseidon to secure a safe journey, the priest Laocoön understands that it is a trap, or an offer asking that the god destroy the city. The priest is sure of what he said that he thrust a spear in the belly, almost piercing Odysseus and the others hidden inside. On the verge of burning it, Priam stops Laocoön and orders for the horse to be brought inside the city to repent the offense made. Odysseus' plan works: with the horse inside the walls, the Acheans come out of the sculpture, warn the hidden companions and Troy is conquered. The tragedy is unstoppable and on that same night, the Trojans are wiped out by the Greeks; this is the destiny also of Priam, of Deiphobus, the new husband of Helen, and of Astianax, the baby son of Hector and Andromache, who is taken from his cradle and thrown out of the walls by Neoptolemus, the cruel son of Achilles. Odysseus starts to cry softly, shaken by violent shivers, and Demodocus, after realising it, recognize him under the shock of all people.

Telemachus and Pisistratus arrive in Sparta, where Menelaus and Helen have just returned from their journey. The sovereigns welcome Telemachus, in contrary to his expectations, finds himself in front of two spouses, tested by the fatigue of the war and the fate of the survivors. Agamemnon, was killed by his wife Clytemnestra, and many met the same death in their homes. He says that the last time he heard about Odysseus, he heard from Proteus, who also told him how to go home. Helen drugs the wine of her husband and of the guests to relieve their pain and tells of the time she saw Odysseus before Troy was conquered. After being beaten to death by his friend Diomedes to appear as a beggar, he entered the city presenting himself as a soldier attacked by his comrades. The priestess Cassandra, immediately believes him and confides in him that she knows that her city is destined to lose, if the Palladium of Athena were to be stolen from the temple. After Cassandra goes away, Helen arrives, who has become the widow of Paris, immediately recognizes Odysseus, although battered and bleeding. Odysseus, furious, threaten her of playing the double-cross and unnecessarily wasting time in that palace, since the entire army of Greece is fighting for her, he finally leaves her, warning her against Menelaus.

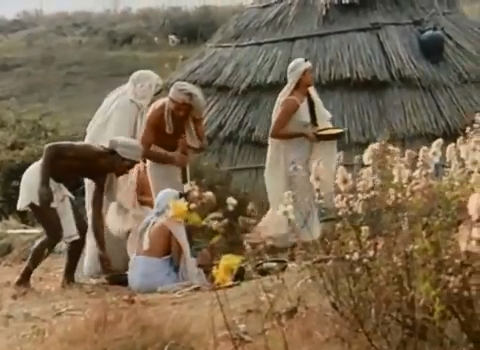
The village of the Lotus-eaters

Odysseus tells the Phaeacians the misadventures that cost him his return home, his fleet and companions. Departing from Troy with twelve ships and many companions, he first loses six men for each of his ships in the land of the Cicones, allies of the Trojans. Later he loses eleven of his twelve ships in the land of the Laestrygonians, giants that sink ships that have entered the port; only the ship of Odysseus is saved, who for precaution had kept it out of the port. Odysseus lands on the Mediterranean coast of Africa, inhabited by strange people called Lotophagi, or eaters of an aphrodisiac flower called Lotus. Three companions are sent scouting, but after several hours they never return. Odysseus goes to look for them and arrives in an immense garden with poor houses. All the inhabitants smile and rave about laughing, and among them there are also the three friends of Odysseus. They have completely lost their memory because they ate the dust obtained from the crushing of the flowers of that field, and now they don't want to leave the island. Even when Odysseus tries to remind them of their wives, children and loved homes, the companions do not express the slightest consideration and continue to devour the lotus with a laugh; Odysseus takes them all and binds them on the ship, to continue the journey.

Odysseus and his companions go to get supplies and so they go hunting until they discover a huge and rough cave. Intrigued, the sailors enter and discover a huge deposit of cheese, milk, and ricotta, and utensils belonging to a giant: the bowls that contain the food are huge, and so are an ax and the bed. However, deaf to the insistence of his companions who would like to leave, believes he can establish a dialogue with the inhabitant whose skills in making knots and producing good ricotta he appreciates, but then there is no more time to escape because the animals of the flock arrive in the cave.

=== Fourth episode: Polyphemus and the gift of Aeolus ===
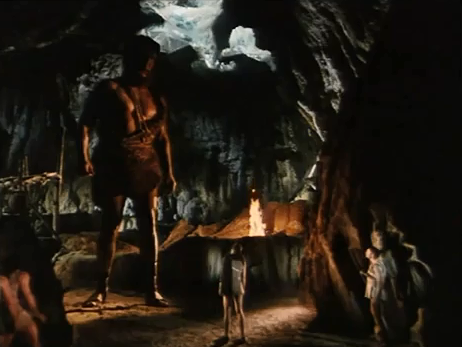
Odysseus talking with Polyphemus

The cave is inhabited by a monstrous giant with feral habits named Polyphemus. The cyclops is horrible to behold, full of hair like a beast and with a single eye in the middle of the forehead. The companions fall to the ground as soon as they see him blocking the entrance to the cave with a huge boulder and asking them to introduce themselves. Odysseus, trying to protect his friends, asks Polyphemus for hospitality, since they need food, and to respect the laws of the powerful and vengeful Zeus in regard to visitors. Polyphemus bursts into a laugh, declaring that he is the son of Poseidon and therefore above any law and that he does not have to obey anyone, not even the other gods. The men run away terrified, but Polyphemus takes one and crushes him in his hand; then he grabs another, fainted from shock, and dashes him violently against a stone, and then eats them both. Odysseus would like to kill him immediately after he has gone to bed, but is held back by his friends, including Eurilochus. If Odysseus had killed the Cyclops while asleep, then no one would have had the strength to remove the gigantic boulder from the entrance, and so the hero is forced to await the end of the night. The next day, however, he gets an idea and orders his companions to take a large olive branch and sharpen it, while the Cyclops goes out to graze the herd. Subsequently, Odysseus draws lots for the companions who should distract the Cyclops, while he hides the trunk, but the chosen ones are not fast enough and Polyphemus devours them too.

All the prisoners are about to lose hope, were it not for the astute Odysseus, who decides to make the Cyclops drink the wine he had brought with him from the ship as a gift for the inhabitants of that land, a special wine, so concentrated that to be drunk normally it should be diluted with as many as 20 measures of water. Having filled a large bowl, Odysseus grabs it and hands it to Polyphemus, who, although suspicious of the new drink, tastes it, immediately becoming crazy for it and demands more. Odysseus brings him another full bowl, which Polyphemus empties. Odysseus, at the request of Polyphemus to reveal his name, replies that he is called "Nobody", whereupon the Cyclops laughs and says that as a reward he will eat him last. Odysseus, without wasting time, after the Cyclops has fallen asleep, calls to him his friends who heat the tip of the tree trunk: the prisoners intend to blind Polyphemus so that he can provide them a means of escape when he opens the entrance. The companions, including Odysseus, take the trunk and approach the bed of Polyphemus, climbing on it and positioning themselves behind the monster's head to implant the trunk. With a shout of encouragement, Odysseus and his companions thrust in the pole, but the cry of pain of Polyphemus is so resounding that it makes them all fall to the ground, while the Cyclops, waving his hands, creates a great disorder and noise in the cave. He also calls screaming to his Cyclops neighbours who, rushing up outside the cave, ask what or who is doing him harm. To the answer "Nobody wants to kill me!" the other Cyclops tell Polyphemus that they can do nothing and that he must pray to Poseidon and abandon him.

After a night of constant and agonizing cries, the next morning Polyphemus opens the cave door to let the sheep and goats out to graze. The companions tie themselves to the bellies of the sheep joined in groups of three bound with ropes, clinging to the bellies of the middle animal, except Odysseus who clings under the fleece of the ram of the herd, so as not to be recognized by the Cyclops, who touches the sheep one by one on the back and sides but never thinking to feel them underneath. The ram comes out last and Polyphemus, after having said words of affection towards the head of the herd, pronounces a curse against Odysseus calling his father Poseidon to him. While his companions hurry to get back on the boat, Odysseus prefers to stay on earth for a moment longer to mock Polyphemus by telling him his real name, that it was Odysseus, the king of Ithaca, who blinded him. Polyphemus, mad with rage, climbs a ledge, cursing him and throwing various boulders against the ship, begging his father to wreck the enemy's boat. Shortly after leaving, Odysseus is forced to land on the island of Aeolus, the god master of the wind, due to bad sea conditions.

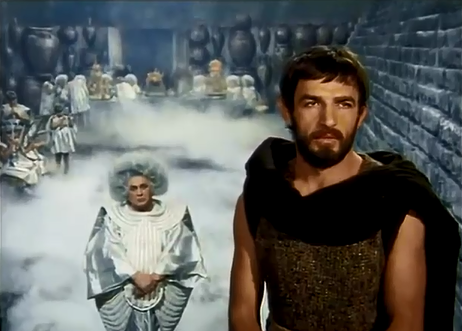
The meeting between Odysseus and Aeolus

Continuing the story, Odysseus arrives on the island of Aeolus and decides to venture alone. Entering a palace, Odysseus finds himself in a huge and opulent banquet room filled with blue steam and "erotes" (flutist kids) playing various instruments and distributing wine. At the end of the room there was a large table full of all kinds of good things, with Aeolus seated in the center and his family at his sides: his wife Cyane, and their sons and daughters, whom he had married to each other to keep the family together. Aeolus is old and stout with silver hair, and asks the hero to eat with them, telling of his exploits of the Trojan war. Odysseus will stay to eat for several months, telling and repeating his stories about him several times, until he asks the god to let him go. Aeolus agrees and moreover decides to give him all the winds of Boreas and Leveche that dominate the world. First, however, he asks Odysseus if any gods persecute him, in which case he could not have given him his gift; Odysseus lies, keeping silent about the fact that Poseidon, after the episode of Polyphemus, is hostile to him. Aeolus, then, gathers all the winds and encloses them in a large sack made with the tanned skin of a ram, and gives them to Odysseus as long as he never opens the sack so as not to trigger a natural cataclysm. Odysseus promises and goes to the ship, to resume the voyage; thanks to the winds he would have reached Ithaca much earlier than expected. The companions, intrigued by the sack, believing that it contained riches, one day, just as the coasts of the much desired island are beginning to be glimpsed, open the bag while Odysseus was sleeping, exhausted, which results in his ship being tossed back and forth across the Mediterranean Sea. Odysseus stops to reflect on his misfortunes, while the queen comments that after all he deserves all his troubles for not being vigilant and for having set himself against the gods, visiting unknown lands and disobeying the orders of friendship with his deceptions.

=== Fifth episode: the island of Circe and the descent to the Underworld ===
Having landed on a new and unknown island, Odysseus together with his companions decide to visit it to see if it was inhabited by beasts or bloodthirsty men. He divides the expedition into two groups: one commanded by Eurilochus and the other by himself. Entering the thick wood, however, the group of fillet is attacked and no one knows people are transformed into pigs. Meanwhile, Odysseus meets a shepherd boy, who tells him the sad fate of the other group. Odysseus would like to rush to their aid, but the god stops him, telling him that this is a spell of the sorceress Circe, and that to free his friends he must first of all eat a flower. After that the hero would have presented himself to the sorceress and would have been led to her abode; Circe would deceive him, by giving him a potion to drink, but Odysseus would have remained immune and would be seized by a terrible desire to stab the sorceress, but restraining himself.

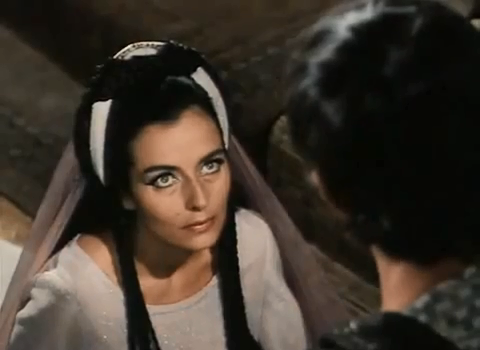
Odysseus together with Arete while he tells her his adventure.

Odysseus hears this prophecy and goes into the garden where he meets a woman, beautiful and terrible at the same time, who subjects him to riddles and tests, but Odysseus solves them all. Circe, realizing that this man is different from all her other victims, decides to take him home to make him drink some wine. Suddenly Odysseus finds himself in a strange abode full of climbing plants and cages containing animals and birds of all kinds, but he is immediately invited to sit by Circe who offers him a golden cup. Odysseus drinks it all in one gulp, yet he suffers greatly from her poison. Meanwhile, Circe laughs, thinking that soon the unfortunate person would turn into a pig too, but suddenly, she goes pale and begins to become terribly ugly: she realized that her powers are ineffective on the hero. Odysseus rushes with the sword drawn to the sorceress, but then remembers the prophecy and doesn't kill her, but he orders her to take him to her friends. Circe takes him to a stable where pigs grunt desperately and turns them back into the people they were before. Due to the sudden metamorphosis, the companions find themselves confused and don't recognize Odysseus, running away every time he tries to talk to them. Circe then takes the opportunity to hold back the hero a little longer, since the effect of the magic on his companions would disappear in a few days, and she spends passionate nights with him.

Circe makes him drink a magic potion that makes him forget Ithaca, and makes him invisible in front of his companions. With Circe, Odysseus will spend a full year, and only the intervention of his companions, tired of living on the ship doing nothing, will bring the hero back to reason. Odysseus asks Circe to be let go once and for all and she accepts, but before leaving she confides him some secrets and above all orders him to go to the underworld. Since many of the gods are hostile to him, Odysseus has a uncertain and dangerous destiny when he sails on the sea and so he needs the prophecies of Tiresias, who aged over 700 years, so that he can sail peacefully to in Ithaca.

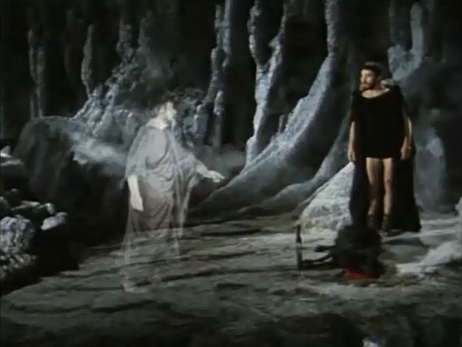
The meeting between Odysseus and Tiresias

Odysseus walks through the island, until he reaches a cave dug into the earth. The place Odysseus finds is lifeless and full of fog. The hero is afraid because to him it seems like an intricate labyrinth full of columns and dead caves and above all he does not see a living soul. Indeed, Circe had advised him to take a black young goat with him to slaughter, so the souls of the deceased could approach, with the hope that among them there was also Tiresias. Odysseus performs the rite and immediately a group of weeping and sighing people appeared, covered by gray cloaks that leave only their faces uncovered. All of them come close to the victim's blood to drink it, but Odysseus drives them away with his sword: only Tiresias will be allowed to quench his thirst. The group disappears and the soothsayer finally appears: he is white-haired, with a long beard and communicates only by speaking in a whisper, and Odysseus invites him to drink. When Tiresias gets up from the ground, his figure appears even more ghostly, as he drips kid's blood from his mouth and he begins to communicate his future journey to Odysseus. He will still have to face many dangers and only in the tenth year after the destruction of Troy will Odysseus be able to embrace his family again, but he will not stay in Ithaca for long because in order to appease Poseidon, Odysseus will someday have to leave Ithaca again in order to make sacrificial offerings to the sea god, as it’s the only way to end his voyages with an old and peaceful death.

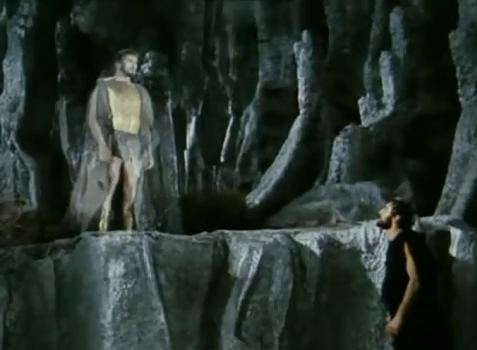
Odysseus meets the spirit of Achilles

Odysseus does not understand everything and leaves Tiresias to feed on the goat's blood again, to venture deeper into the Underworld. He sees a soul: it is that of Agamemnon who reveals to him that he was stabbed in treason together with the concubine Cassandra by his wife Clytemnestra. The woman was still upset by the ancient sacrifice of her daughter Iphigenia at the behest of her father, since the gods did not allow him to depart for Troy without this sacrifice, and she now had one more reason to slaughter Agamemnon: his betrayal of her with the Trojan prophetess. Agamemnon warns the hero when he returns to Ithaca: no woman is faithful to her husband and above all she will try to kill him after so many years away, and this could also happen with Penelope and Telemachus. Agamemnon's weeping soul goes away and Odysseus, more shocked than ever, meets another one: the spirit of the brave Achilles, who died at the hands of the god Apollo and the arrows of Paris. Achilles appears more lugubrious than Agamemnon and confides in Odysseus that he would rather be a slave to the most vile and cruel master in the world than be forced to rule the dead in Hades. The last spirit that Odysseus meets in the Underworld is the mother Anticlea. Odysseus asks her how she died and she, crying, communicates that she died waiting for the arrival of her son in Ithaca. Then Odysseus realizes the atrocity and uselessness of the war fought for so many years in Troy to take back the bride of a betrayed king, and to have wasted time in continuous journeys in the Mediterranean, without realizing that the loved ones died of despair waiting for him in Ithaca; remembering this, he weeps bitterly at the feet of the spirit. His mother invites him not to despair and to hurry on his return to the island because if he arrives too late, his father Laertes, who had long since retired to live like a filthy hermit among animals, will soon die of a broken heart, too.

Odysseus also becomes aware of the abuses of the suitors who infest his palace by undermining Penelope's innocence, and hearing these words is seized by a wave of anger, but first tries to hug in vain his mother's knees, who disappears every time she is touched. Going towards the exit, Odysseus sees another soul: it is his friend Elpenor, who died very recently due to his intoxicated state. In fact the companions, in the world of the living on the island of Circe, had given themselves to mad joy to drive away the worries and Elpenor, who had drunk too much, had fallen from a ledge, breaking his neck. Odysseus promises to the soul that he will have a worthy burial once he gets back up and so he does, burying him right on the island's beach, shouting his name together as many times as enough to reach the ears of the distant mother.

Circe communicates terrible things to Odysseus about his next travels: the first trial to face is the crossing of the rock of the fearsome sirens, then he will have to overcome the passage between Scylla and Charybdis. It is believed that this was only overcome by Jason with the Argonauts thanks to the help of a god, an epic feat narrated by Apollonius Rhodius in the Argonautica. The last effort of Odysseus will be the stop on the island of the Trident, where there are grazing cows sacred to the god Helios, or the Sun, inviolable if one did not want to incur the wrath of the divine master. Circe confides all these things to Odysseus and then vanishes, leaving him confused and amazed. The hero communicates the stages to his companions and invites them to leave, but something has changed in them: they are slowly losing faith in their leader.

=== Sixth episode: the Sirens, Scylla and Charybdis, the island of the Sun and the return to Ithaca ===
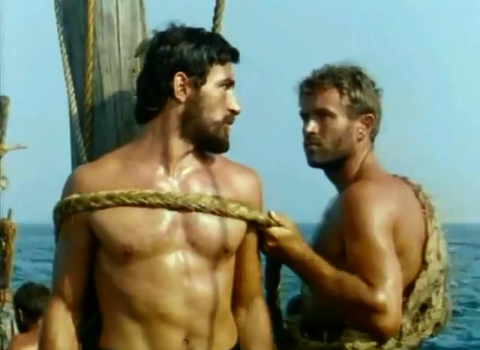
Odysseus is tied to the mast by Eurilochus

Encouraged his companions to embark to return to Ithaca, Odysseus resumes his journey, immediately approaching the rock of the sirens. These are beings not visible to man, although the legend endows them with the bodies of rapacious birds and the heads of beautiful women, and they have the power to enchant travelers with their voice, to finally make them smash their boat on the rock. The companions believe that Odysseus has gone mad, as he wants to cover their ears with wax so that they do not hear the voice. Odysseus, to show them that he is perfectly lucid, is tied by Eurilochus to the mainmast, recommending him to hold tighter if he begged to untie him. The ship has now reached the rock and while skirting it, Odysseus glimpses the bones of the unfortunate sailors, victims of the Sirens, and finally begins to hear their voices that penetrate his mind, obscuring it. The voices insistently invite Odysseus to land on the island so that he can end his days in joy and carefree after so many years of fighting and living in pain, but Eurilochus holds him tight and so Odysseus, severely tested by the power of the Sirens, manages to overcome the rock with his companions.

The second stage is the crossing of a narrow gorge between two huge rocks: Scylla and Charybdis. However, Odysseus, believing he was wasting too much time in the crossing and not getting out of it alive, took another longer route that brought him to the island of the Trident, consecrated to the god Helios (the Sun) for his cows to graze on its grass.

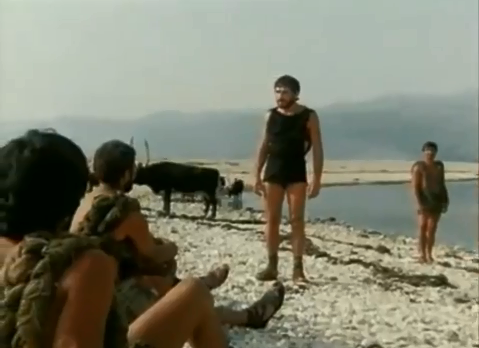
Odysseus tries to convince the companions not to kill the cows of the Sun

The ship lands on the beach and immediately a great calm falls on the area, preventing the companions from resuming the journey soon. In fact, Odysseus was reluctantly forced by his friends Heraclius, Eurilochus, Polites and Filetor, who no longer had faith in their commander; now the sailors can only hope for the food they have brought with them and the fish they can catch. Odysseus no longer knows what to do because Circe's prophecy had told him that if anyone dared to kill a single cow, the entire ship would be annihilated by the gods. The hero does everything to prevent his companions, now exhausted for weeks by hunger and lack of food, from doing it, but one day when he climbs a cliff to implore Zeus, a misfortune occurs. Eurilochus has had a heifer killed and has feasted on it with the others all night; Odysseus does not even scold him because he already knows that the fate of those unfortunates is sealed. In fact, after leaving the island due to the sudden return of the wind, a terrible storm unleashed by Poseidon arrives and wrecks the ship with his companions. Only Odysseus is saved on a beam and is tossed for seven days in the sea until he arrives on the island of Calypso.

After the sad tale of all his misadventures, Odysseus asks King Alcinous for a new ship and a crew to reach the now nearby Ithaca and the good king grants it to him. Arriving on the beloved island, Odysseus, since he hadn't seen it for twenty years, no longer recognizes anything about his homeland and immediately asks a shepherd for information about the place. The boy is none other than his protector Athena who, to put him to the test, asks him who he is. Odysseus, keeping his personal details hidden, tells him that he is an unfortunate sailor from Egypt and Athena praises him for his shrewdness, transforming him into an old beggar so that he is not immediately recognized by the inhabitants and family members, so that he can better plan his revenge. When the boy is gone, Odysseus arrives in the house of Eumaeus, the pig keeper and most trusted servant of Odysseus, who welcomes him amicably as tradition dictates to any guest, obviously not recognizing him. Odysseus is amazed by the goodness of the man and begins to ask questions about the fate of that unfortunate fighter who left for Troy and never returned home, leaving his wife desperate, and his son, who went in search of him. Eumaeus tells everything in detail and Odysseus, although tempted to show him who he really is, does not.

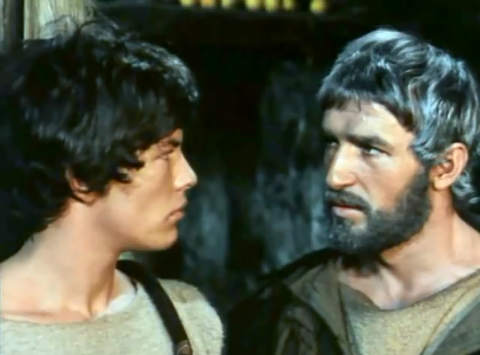
The meeting between Odysseus and Telemachus

Meanwhile, Telemachus returns to Pylos from Sparta, more disheartened than ever, and lets the soothsayer Theoclimenus on board, convinced that he can tell him something about his father; by now Telemachus is willing to do anything and is ready to believe anyone's testimony. Getting that man on board proves to be an excellent action for Telemachus because Theoclimenus advises him to reverse the route to Ithaca, not passing through the Strait of Samos, since a snare of suitors was waiting there. Telemachus arrives safely in Ithaca and goes at night to the house of Eumaeus where Odysseus is also waiting for him. Then the goddess Athena appears to the hero and tells him that now he can finally reveal himself to his trusted family members and the night ends with a tender and moving embrace between Odysseus and his son weeping with joy. The following day the three plan the way to enter the court, relying on the help of Eumaeus and Penelope, while the ship returns to the port with the suitors, more angry than ever about the failed coup.

Penelope is worried about her son's fate, but is reassured when she sees him appear safe and sound on the doorstep with Theoclimenus, and invites them to wash themselves and then eat. Refreshed, Telemachus approaches her mother, gently resting his head on her knee, and asks her what Odysseus was like before his birth. Happy, Penelope remembers when her husband, poorer than ever, came to her house to ask for her hand, although chased away by her future father-in-law. He, knowing that Penelope loved him secretly, went towards her chariot and the girl had chased him, begging him to let her up. The father, beside himself with rage, stood in front of the chariot, but Odysseus overtook him anyway, avoiding him and married Penelope. The episode ends with Theoclimenus who foretells the arrival of Odysseus in a few days and Eumaeus who leads his master Odysseus, always dressed as a beggar, to the court.

=== Seventh episode: Odysseus beggar at the court and the eve of the final competition ===
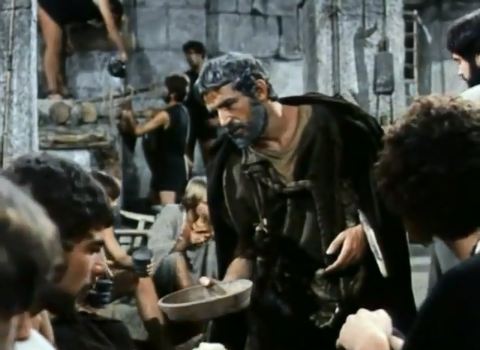
Odysseus appears in front of the suitors dressed as a beggar

Odysseus is accompanied by Eumaeus to the palace, but first he stops in front of an old and decrepit dog: it is Argos, the dog loved by Odysseus, now dying, who recognizes his master, even after twenty years of absence, and finally dies happy. At the prompting of Athena, in his beggar's disguise, he approaches the suitors for alms. The welcome of the suitors is rude and cruel: they mock and insult him, not knowing what fate awaits them in a few days. The episode is one of the most characteristic of the entire work because there is a continuous connection of the narrative that passes both through the mouth of a male voiceover (as happened in the other episodes) and into the lips of muses in the guise of handmaids. Telemachus cannot endure for long the abuses of the suitors against his father who is even beaten by Antinous, leader of the suitors, when he approaches the latter for alms. As if that were not enough, the corpulent Arnaeus (known as Irus) also arrives at the court, who boasts of being the strongest of all beggars and bullies Odysseus, fearing that the latter wants to steal his place. The suitors propose to make them fight by giving away a choice piece of roast meat and they head into the courtyard. At first it seems that Arnaeus is about to win but then the bully's blows awaken an ancient wrath in Odysseus' chest, who knocks him down with a single well-aimed blow on the jaw. Bleeding and staggering, Arnaeus falls to the ground and Odysseus places him in front of a column, with a stern warning not to challenge him any further or suffer a worse fate.

He is later summoned to meet with Penelope, to speak with the queen in private. Penelope is intrigued by that stranger and she would like to know more about him. Odysseus lies and tells her that he is Aethon, brother of the Cretan king Idomeneus, son of Minos, but he claims to have known Odysseus, describing in every detail his cloak with the golden buckle depicting a dog tearing a deer. Penelope is amazed and even deludes herself into recognizing this beggar as her husband, but Odysseus controls his emotions by reminding her that he is only a Minoan warrior who fell from grace after the Trojan War.

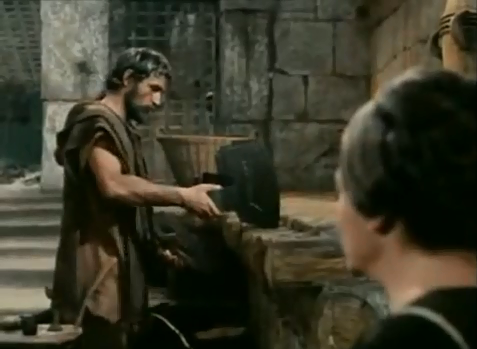
Odysseus while placing the axes for the competition

Eurycleia, the oldest and wisest handmaid in the palace, is called to wash the beggar's feet and, going up to the knee, she recognizes a scar. This is the wound inflicted on the hero by a wild boar many years earlier during a hunting trip. The nurse has finally recognized her master, but he covers her mouth, fearing that she may, even if unwilling, ruin all her plans for revenge. Eurycleia is sworn to silence and Odysseus goes to the stables where a young cowherd is feeding a bullock: it is Philoetius, hired by Odysseus when he was a ten-year-old boy; not even he recognizes his master. Eumaeus, knowing everything, is equally silent.

The day long-awaited by suitors is approaching, that is the one in which Penelope will decide who will be the new husband and king of Ithaca; indeed, the rude suitors had not yet brought gifts for the queen and she, to buy time, had demanded that they bring them to her. On the same day as the delivery of the gifts, Penelope had ordered that a competition be organized with the bow of Odysseus and her winner would become her new husband. Both Odysseus and Penelope pass the night before the appointed day sleepless; the first is strongly tempted to reveal himself to his wife, the other has a vision. Indeed, she imagines a large group of geese being mowed down by the arrival of a large eagle and she is torn between joy and fear for the true arrival of her beloved husband.

The fateful day arrives and Penelope goes to take Odysseus' bow. It was believed that no one except the hero was able to stretch it, because the master had made it from the horns of an ox sacred to the gods and smeared it with grease every time before using it and always loosened the bowstring when he didn't need it. Telemachus also wants to register for the competition, to prevent one of the suitors from winning and holds the bow, but he is unable to pull the string. While Antinous prepares for the deed, he sees the beggar Odysseus placing side by side on a horizontal beam twelve axes with a large hole in the middle of the blade, so that there was a single and perfect invisible line between the holes of each blade.

=== Eighth episode: victory of Odysseus and the recognition of Penelope ===
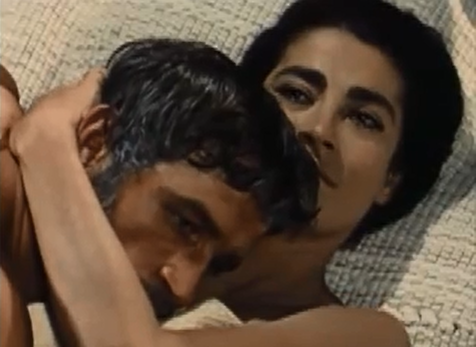
Odysseus together with Penelope

Antinous tries to draw the bow but it is impossible for him; the other suitors are also unsuccessful. Then Odysseus, in his beggar disguise, asks humbly to be able to try to thread the bow. All the suitors mock him for daring to be their equal, but Penelope steps in and gives him permission to do so. Odysseus skillfully draws the bow, shooting the arrow and making it pass through all the holes in the axes. He then turns towards Antinous and kills him with an arrow to the side. The suitors are in a shock at his deed, then Odysseus strips off his rags and reveals himself to them, sending them in a panic. Eurymachus, the second foremost of the suitors, lays the blame on Antinous for being the instigator of wasting the palace resources and offers compensation for everything they had consumed, but Odysseus rejects his proposition and proceeds to shoot him and the other suitors. They begin to panic and try to escape his wrath but they are unable to, for the doors had been locked beforehand on Odysseus' orders. They do not even have weapons to defend themselves: all of these had been secreated by Telemachus and Eumaeus the previous night. With the help of Telemachus and the loyal servants Eumaeus the swineherd and Philoetius the cowherd, Odysseus slaughters all suitors. Not even one is saved, and the maids who had betrayed the trust of Queen Penelope by consorting with the suitors are made to clean up the blood and gore and dispose of the bodies of the dead suitors before being punished themselves for their disloyalty by being hanged.

Finally Odysseus has taken his revenge and is waiting for nothing but to go to the room of Penelope, who has witnessed all, terrified and amazed at the carnage. The woman is not yet fully convinced that the warrior is Odysseus, but she lets him into the room. The recognition occurs when Penelope proposes to move the nuptial bed, to which Odysseus replies that this is impossible, because that bed had been built by himself by carving it from a huge tree trunk, around which he had then built his palace. Penelope then has no more doubts and she embraces the groom crying and laughing with joy. Odysseus, moved by her, tells her all her misfortunes and with her he spends a long and happy night of love; in fact Aurora prolongs the night by not letting dawn arrive for several days. The final part of the episode tells of the peace-making, through the intercession of Mentor and Athena, between Odysseus and the relatives of the suitors, who are seeking vengeance for their deaths. When the clash between the two parties in the fields near Laertes' hut (where Odysseus had gone with his family) seems inevitable, at the urging of Mentor and Athena, Odysseus first lays down his arms, kneeling in a sense of respect for the relatives of the young dead, then the same is done by the father who led the opposing party, thus sanctioning the pacification.

== Cast ==
- Bekim Fehmiu: Odysseus (Ulisse)
- Irene Papas: Penelope
- Renaud Verley: Telemachus (Telemaco)
- Roy Purcell: Alcinous (Alcinoo)
- Marina Berti: Arete
- Scilla Gabel: Helen (Elena)
- Barbara Bach: Nausicaa
- Juliette Mayniel: Circe
- Kyra Bester: Calypso (Calipso)
- Michèle Breton: Athena (Atena)
- Constantin Nepo: Antinous (Antinoo)
- Ivica Pajer: Eurylochus (Euriloco)
- Samson Burke: Polyphemus (Polifemo)
- Fausto Tozzi: Menelaus (Menelao)
- Jaspar Von Oertzen: Nestor (Nestore)
- Franco Balducci: Mentor (Mentore)
- Husein Cokic: Eumaeus (Eumeo)
- Branko Kovacic: Laertes (Laerte)
- Vladimir Leib: Aeolus (Eolo)
- Karl-Otto Alberty: Eurymachus (Eurimaco)
- Maurizio Tocchi: Leocritus (Leocrito)
- Ilija Ivezić: Ctesippus (Ctesippo)
- Petar Buntic: Filetor (Filettore)
- Duje Novakovic: Elpenor (Elpenore)
- Sime Jagarinac: Heraclius (Eraclio)
- Petar Dobric: Polites (Polite)
- Franco Fantasia: Mentes (Mente)
- Voyo Goric: Philetius (Filezio)
- Luciano Rossi: Theoclymenus (Teoclimeno)
- Giulio Donnini: Tiresias (Tiresia)
- Bianca Doria: Anticlea
- Sergio Ferrero: Pisistratus (Pisistrato)
- Enzo Fiermonte: Demodocus (Demodoco)
- Stefanella Giovannini: Cassandra
- Peter Hinwood: Hermes (Ermete/Hermes)
- Miodrag Loncar: Irus (Iro)
- Hrvoje Svob: Phemius (Femio)
- Giulio Cesare Tomei: Priam (Priamo)
- Rolf Boysen: Agamemnon (Agamennone)
- Gérard Herter: Laocoön (Laocoonte)
- Nona Medici: Iftime
- Mimmo Palmara: Achilles (Achille)
- Giancarlo Prete: Euryades (Euriade)
- Andrea Saric: Melantho (Melanto)
- Orso Maria Guerrini: Leodes (Leode)
- Ada Morotti: Cyane (Ciane)
- Laura Nucci: Antinoo's Mother

== Production ==
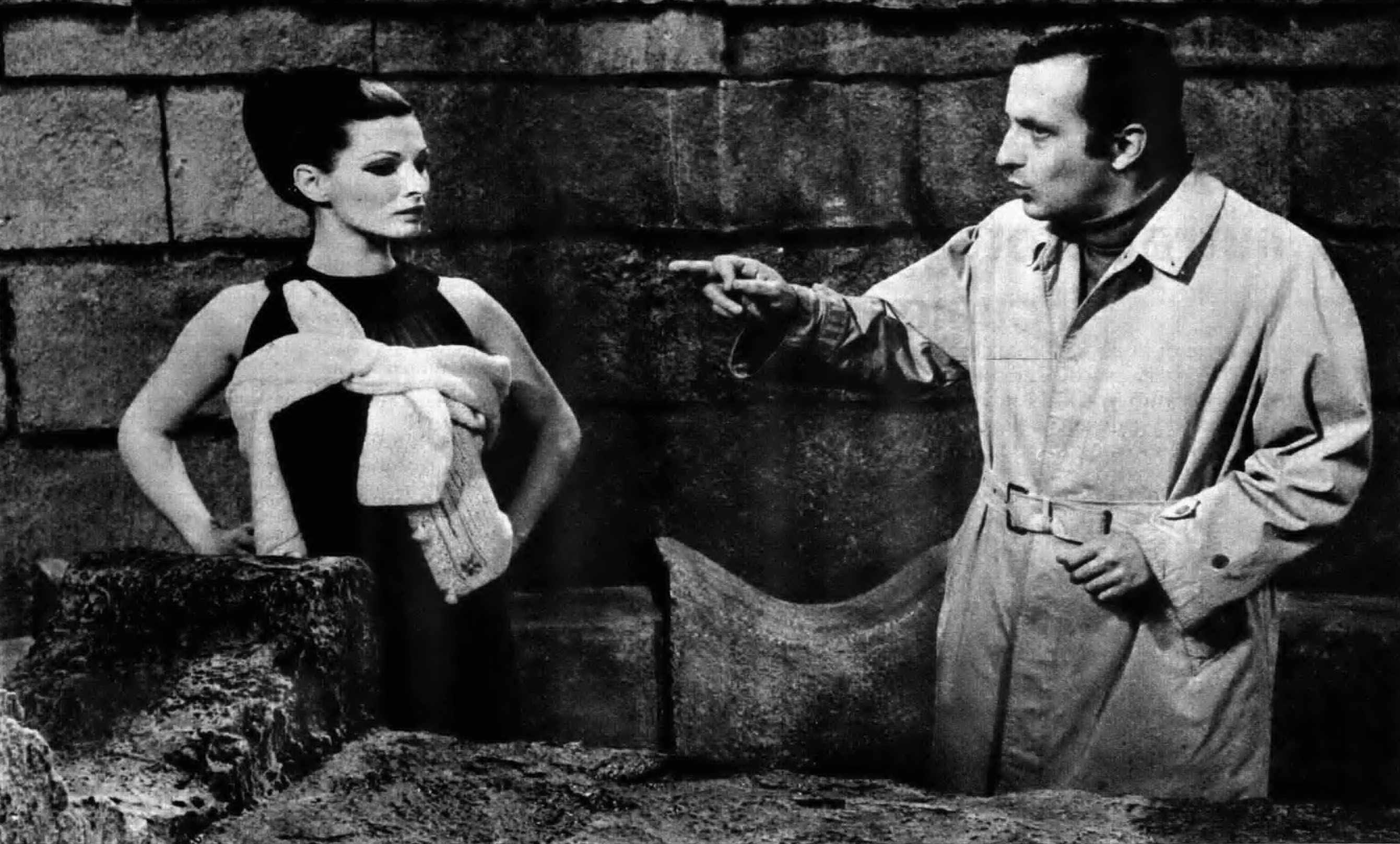
Scilla Gabel (Helen) on set with the assistant director Piero Schivazappa

The miniseries was produced principally for broadcasting on the state televisions of Italy, Germany and France. There are 8 episodes in the original version, running a total of 446 minutes. Each episode is preceded by an introduction in which poet Giuseppe Ungaretti read some verses of the original poem.

The screenplay was written by a team of six.

Special effects were designed by Mario Bava (who outright directed the Polyphemus episode) and Carlo Rambaldi.

The exteriors were shot entirely in Yugoslavia, which offered a scenery that was similar to the lands of Ancient Greece.

== Release ==
The show ran on television in Europe between 1968 and 1970. In Italy alone, the episodes had an audience of over 16 million viewers. The entire television series was dubbed into English, ran several times on the TVO network in Ontario, Canada, and was broadcast in the US by CBS years later in 1978. An abridged theatrical version (running only 110 minutes) was released to European theatres as well, also available in English, but the English dub was later lost. There are DVD editions still available in Italian and German.

== Reception ==
The adaptation is considered by some to be the most faithful rendering of Homer's epic on screen, by including most of the characters and events, as well as by attempting to fill in graphic details.

== See also ==
- Eneide (TV serial)
