= Epic: The Musical =

2022–24 adaptation of Homer's Odyssey

EPIC: The Musical
- The album cover of The Troy Saga, the first installment of the musical
- Music: Jorge Rivera-Herrans
- Lyrics: Jorge Rivera-Herrans
- Setting: Greek Heroic Age
- Basis: Odyssey by Homer

Epic: The Musical (stylized as EPIC) is a nine-part series of album musicals (referred to as "sagas") written and produced in their entirety by Puerto Rican actor and singer-songwriter Jorge Rivera-Herrans. This musical project, released between 2022 and 2024, is a sung-through adaptation of the Ancient Greek epic poem Odyssey by Homer and takes inspiration from different musical genres as well as modern musical theater, anime and video games. It recounts the story of Odysseus as he tries to return from Troy to his island kingdom of Ithaca after the conclusion of the decade-long Trojan War. Along the years-long journey, he encounters multiple gods and monsters who either help or hinder him in his quest to return home to his wife Penelope and son Telemachus.

The musical project gained popularity in 2021 through TikTok and faced production troubles due to multiple lawsuits between the creator and its original record company. It has received widespread praise from reviewers and listeners for the emotional depth and narrative complexity it exhibits through its musical format.

== Plot ==
=== Act 1 ===
==== The Troy Saga ====
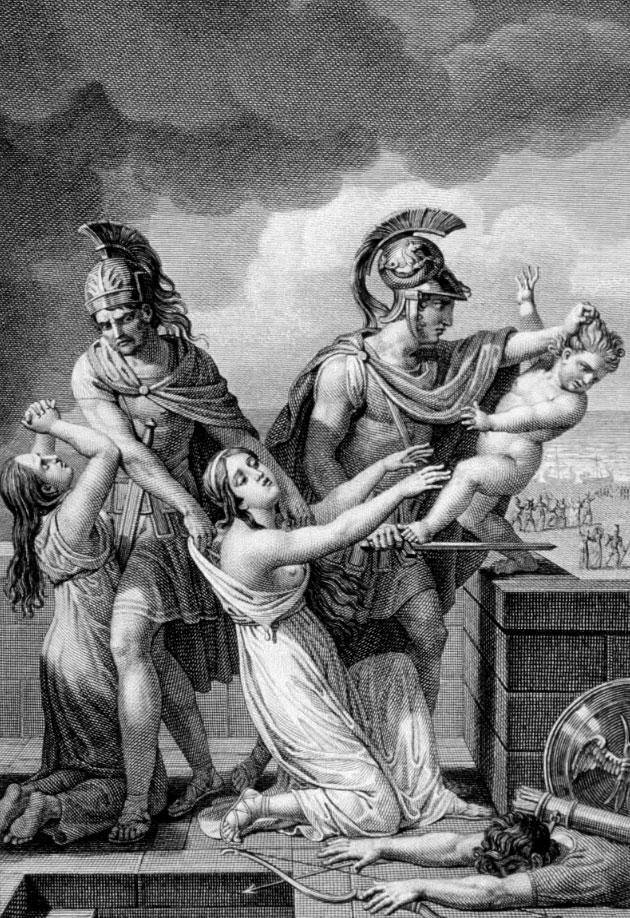
The murder of the baby Astyanax at the hands of Odysseus is a key moment in The Troy Saga.

After ten years of stalemated fighting in the Trojan War, King Odysseus of Ithaca leads his men in a successful invasion of Troy using the Trojan Horse. While sacking the city, Odysseus receives a vision from the god Zeus informing him that if he does not kill the infant Astyanax, son of the Trojan prince Hector, the boy will eventually grow up to seek vengeance against Odysseus and his family ("The Horse and the Infant"). Odysseus struggles with the decision, thinking of his own son and contemplating what actions can be reasonably justified, but he ultimately decides to kill the child ("Just a Man"). (Note: The murder of Astyanax is not directly depicted in Epic, but rather implied contextually.)

Following the destruction of Troy, Odysseus and his fleet of six hundred men set sail towards their home in Greece. He and his best friend Polites decide to explore a nearby island to search for food ("Full Speed Ahead"). Seeing Odysseus' guilt over his actions during the war, Polites tries to convince him to move on with a kinder outlook on the world. They encounter the mischievous lotus-eaters, (Note: Both the lotus-eaters and the followers of Aeolus are depicted in the musical as "Winions", fictional creatures originally created by Rivera-Herrans.) who direct them to find food in a cave further to the east ("Open Arms"). At this moment, the goddess of wisdom and war, Athena, who has mentored Odysseus since boyhood, sees his non-violent compromise with the lotus-eaters as weakness and straying from her teachings. She appears to him, replaying the memory of when they first met, in order to remind him of her expectations ("Warrior of the Mind").

==== The Cyclops Saga ====
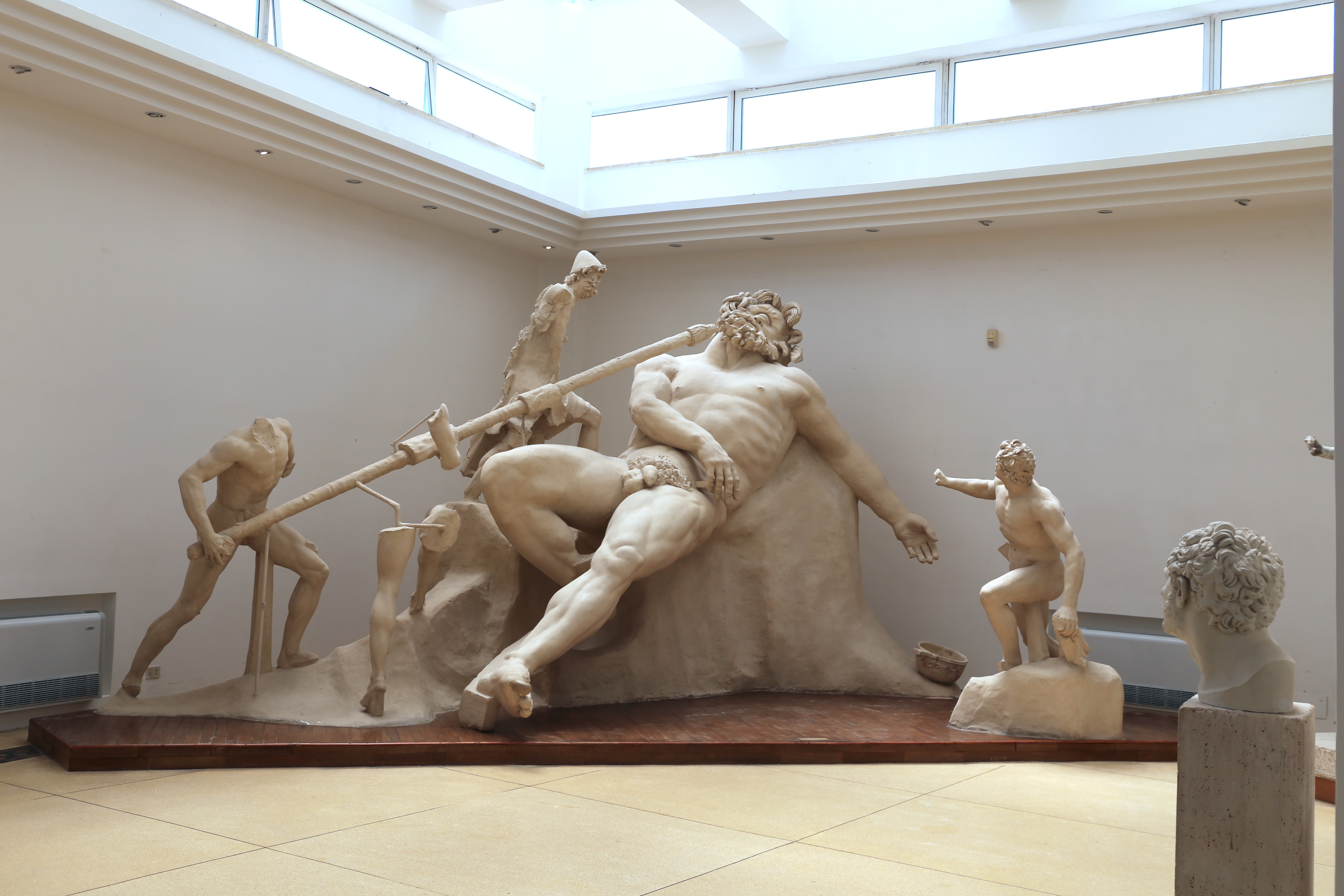
The Cyclops Saga follows the conflict between Odysseus's men and the cyclops Polyphemus.

Arriving at the new island, Odysseus and a scouting party find a cave full of sheep and kill one for food. The sheep's owner, the Cyclops Polyphemus, angrily emerges and threatens to eat the men as revenge. Odysseus attempts to reason with him and offers the Cyclops some Greek wine as payment for the sheep. Polyphemus accepts the gift and asks Odysseus for his name, which he claims to be "Nobody". Polyphemus drinks the wine before deciding to attack the men anyway ("Polyphemus"). Odysseus rallies his men to fight against Polyphemus, until the Cyclops retrieves a massive club that allows him to slaughter several men, including Polites, before suddenly passing out ("Survive").

Odysseus reveals that he drugged the wine with lotus fruit he took from the lotus-eaters, and he tells his men to fight on in the memory of their dead comrades. Using their swords, they sharpen Polyphemus's club into a spear and impale the sleeping Cyclops through his eye. His screams of pain attract other Cyclopes, who disregard him when Polyphemus says that "Nobody" attacked him. Odysseus and the surviving men then steal the sheep and escape, but Athena appears once again, angry that he didn't finish the job by killing Polyphemus. Odysseus ignores her, instead revealing his true name to the Cyclops in an act of hubris before escaping. ("Remember Them"). Athena and Odysseus argue about his decision to spare Polyphemus, ultimately deciding to end their connection ("My Goodbye").

==== The Ocean Saga ====
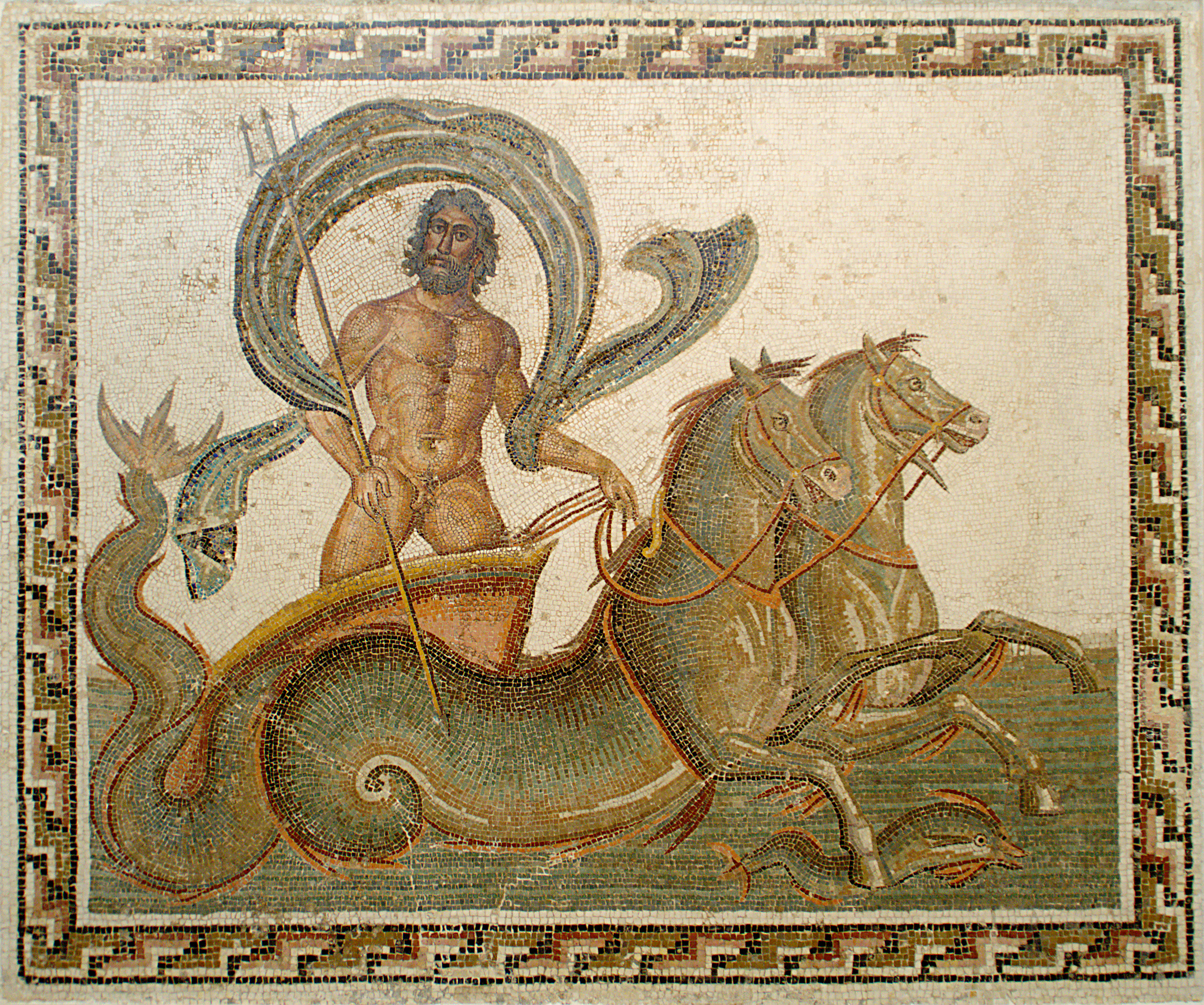
The musical's main antagonist, Poseidon, is introduced in The Ocean Saga.

As the crew carry on, they battle a sudden and large storm before coming across a floating island in the sky ("Storm"). Recognizing the island as the home of the god Aeolus, Odysseus plans to climb up and ask the god to help them out of the storm. Eurylochus, his second-in-command, expresses doubt that this plan will work. Odysseus harshly reminds him to follow orders and to not contradict him in front of the crew ("Luck Runs Out"). Upon reaching the island, Aeolus gives Odysseus a bag filled with the winds of the storm, enabling him to return home as long as it stays closed. Odysseus returns to his ship, but a rumor spreads among the crew that the bag contains treasure. Odysseus stays awake for nine days protecting it from his crew, before he ultimately falls asleep and the bag is opened. Odysseus and Eurylochus close the bag before all of the wind escapes, but the fleet is blown into the land of the Laestrygonians. ("Keep Your Friends Close"). The ocean god Poseidon appears, revealing himself as Polyphemus's father. He vows vengeance for Odysseus's attack against his son, stating that even killing the Cyclops would have avoided his wrath. Poseidon sinks all of the fleet's ships except for Odysseus's, leaving only forty-three men alive. Before Poseidon can destroy the last ship, Odysseus reopens the wind bag, releasing the last of the storm inside and blowing his ship to safety ("Ruthlessness").

==== The Circe Saga ====
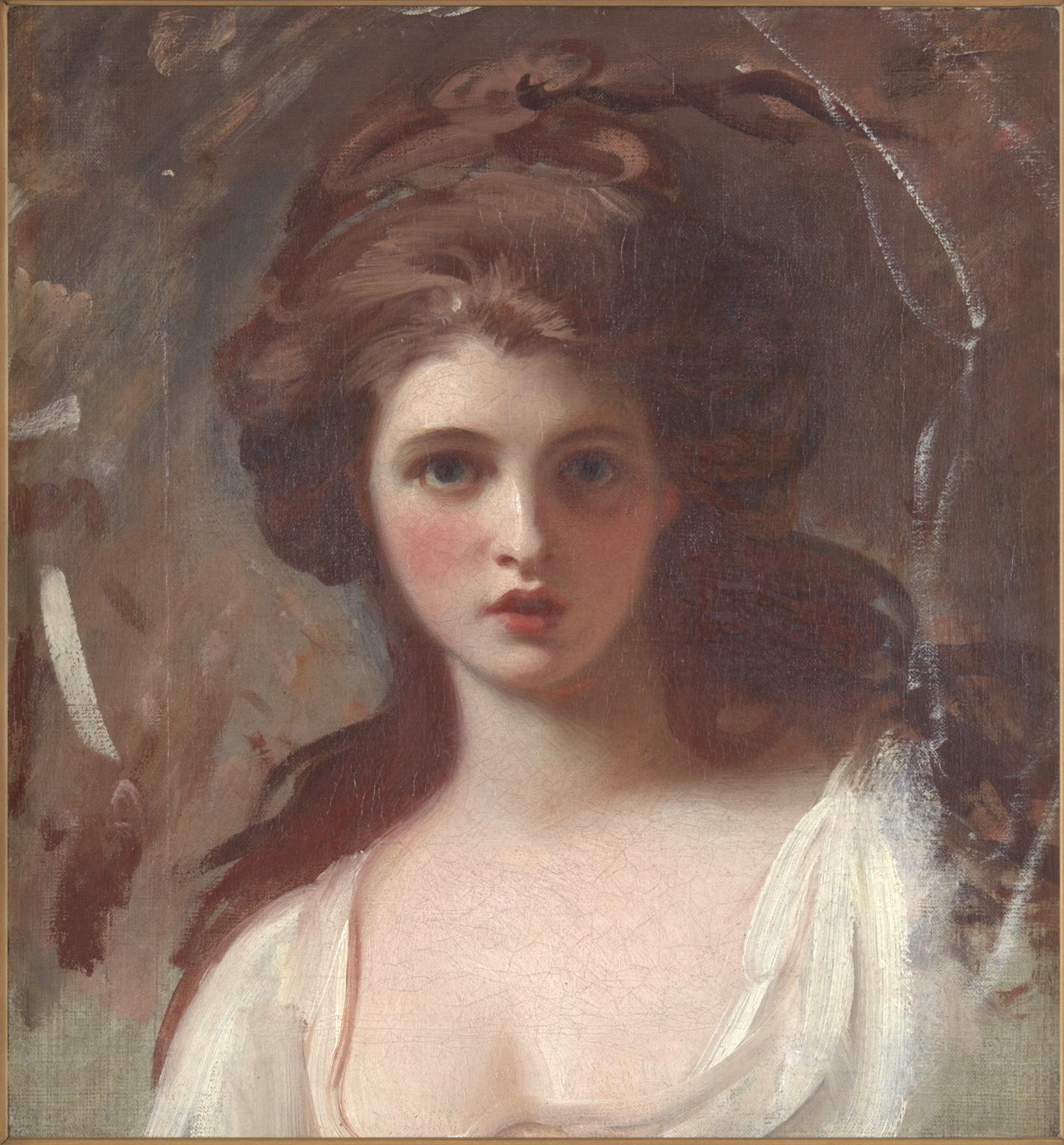
The witch Circe serves as the antagonist of The Circe Saga.

Beaching on an island, Odysseus sends out a scouting crew, led by Eurylochus. They encounter the witch Circe, who transforms all who entered her palace into pigs. Eurylochus escapes back to Odysseus, but they argue over whether they should rescue the men or leave, with Odysseus ultimately deciding to confront Circe at her palace ("Puppeteer"). Hermes, herald and messenger of the gods, appears to Odysseus and gives him the magical moly herb, granting him even footing against Circe ("Wouldn't You Like").

Upon reaching the palace, Circe and Odysseus battle and Odysseus gains the upper hand ("Done For"). Switching tactics, Circe tries to seduce Odysseus, but thinking of his wife, Penelope, he rejects her advances. Inspired by his loyalty and hoping to ultimately create a kinder world, Circe agrees to let his men go and directs them to the Underworld, where they can evade Poseidon and seek further advice from the spirit of the blind prophet Tiresias ("There Are Other Ways").

==== The Underworld Saga ====
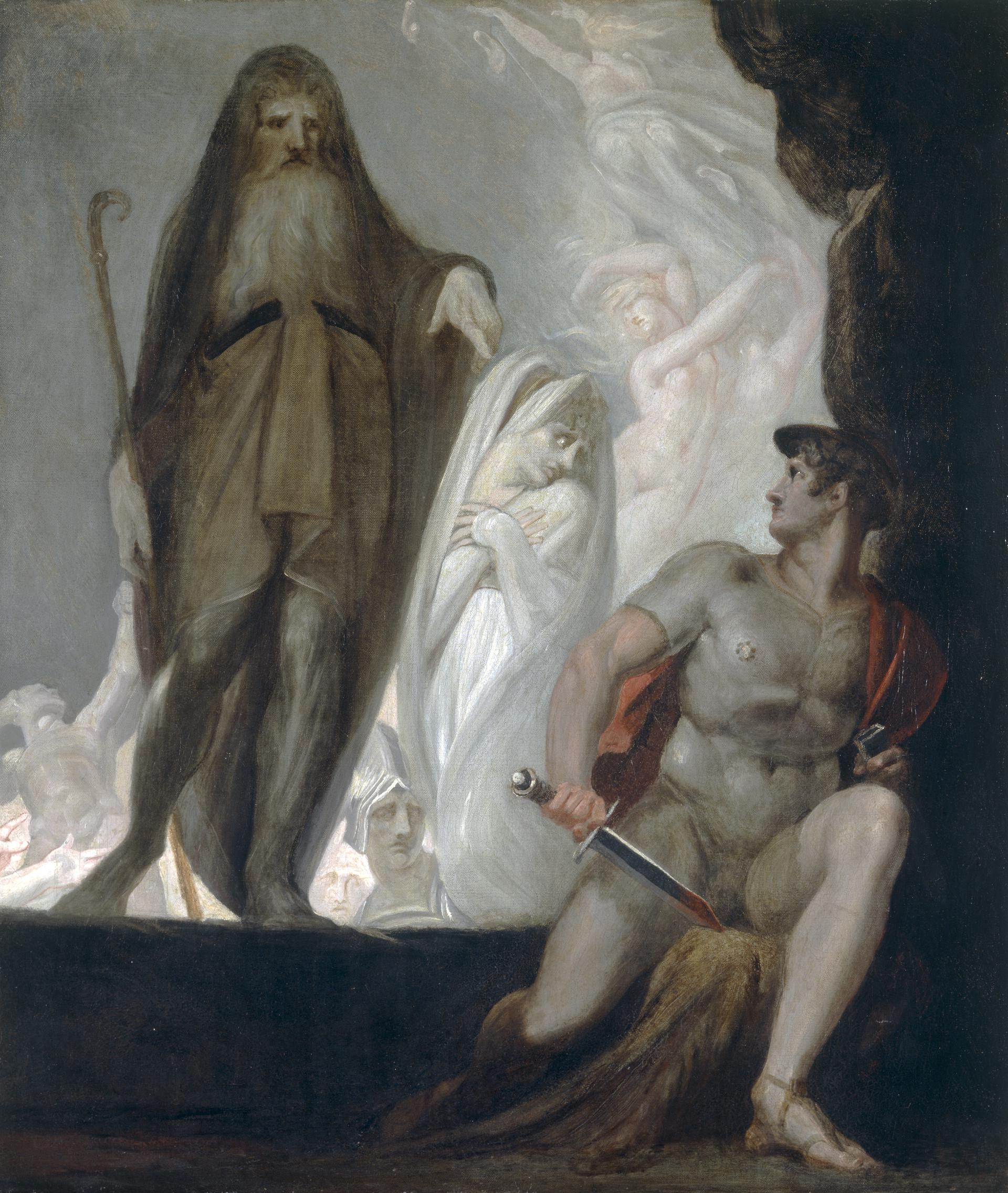
Odysseus encounters the spirits of the prophet Tiresias and his mother Anticlea in The Underworld Saga.

Sailing into the underworld, Odysseus and his crew pass by the souls of his slain fleet, including Polites, as well as Odysseus's mother Anticlea, whom he now realizes had died while waiting for him to return home ("The Underworld"). Odysseus eventually reaches Tiresias, who states that despite having clairvoyant vision of the past and future, he does not see any future in which Odysseus returns home unchanged ("No Longer You"). Distraught upon hearing this, Odysseus decides to bury his softer side, embracing ruthlessness and resolving to return home by any means necessary, comparing himself to the other monsters he'd fought on his travels ("Monster").

=== Act 2 ===
==== The Thunder Saga ====
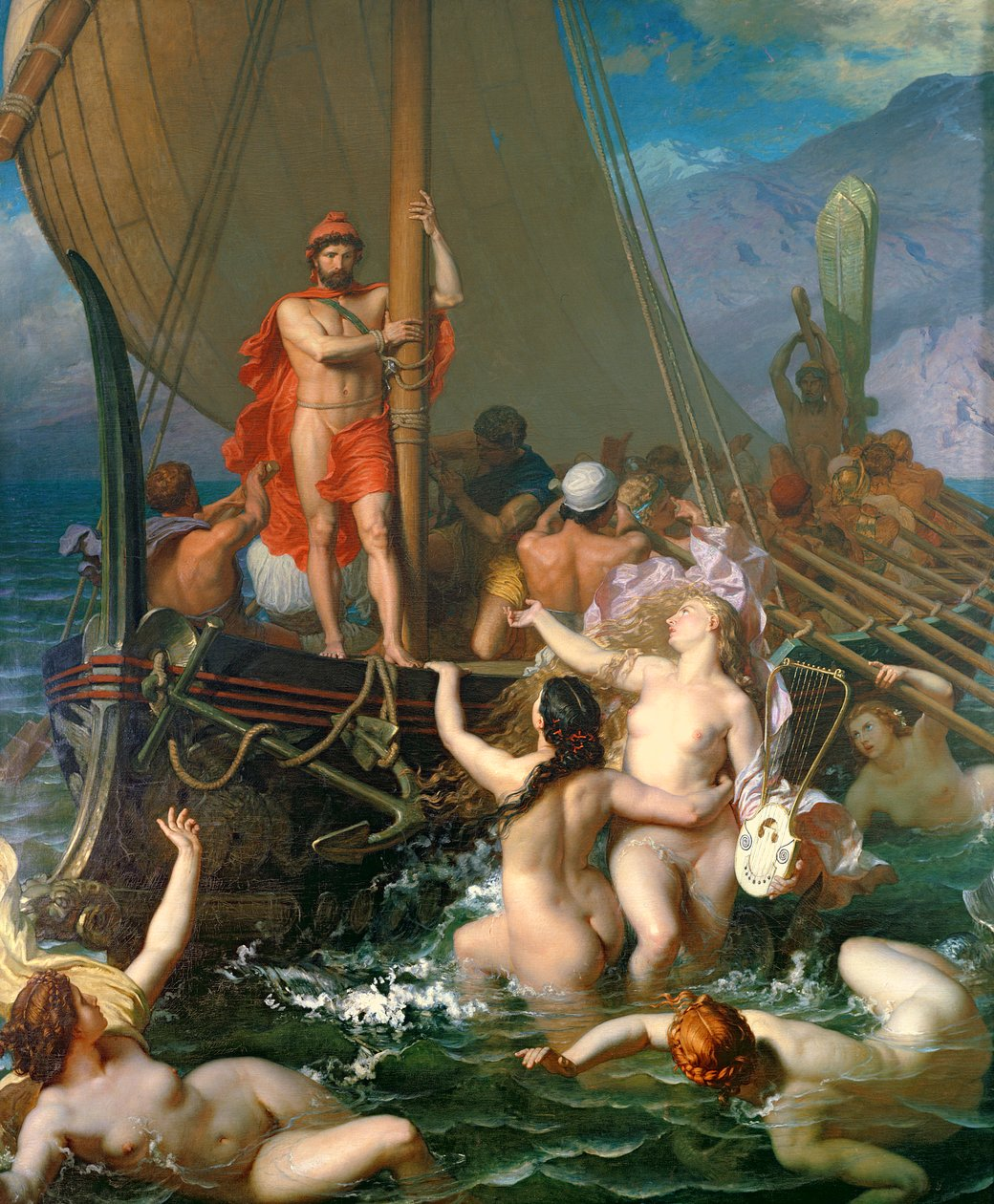
The Thunder Saga begins with Odysseus encountering the deceitful sirens.

Back on the open sea, Odysseus encounters a siren disguised as his wife Penelope. While playing along with her charade, he asks her how he can return home without passing Poseidon, and she reveals that can only happen by going through the lair of the six-headed sea monster Scylla, where Poseidon is afraid to go. She asks Odysseus to join her in the water, saying that she could relieve all of his suffering ("Suffering"). Odysseus appears to give in before attacking her and exposing her identity. He reveals that he and his crew resisted her magical song by plugging their ears with beeswax, and his crew captures the rest of the sirens in the water. The sirens beg for mercy, but Odysseus vows to not make the same mistake he made with Polyphemus and commands his crew to kill them all ("Different Beast"). The crew then sail towards Scylla's lair, where Eurylochus reveals to Odysseus that he was the one who opened Aeolus's wind bag. Ignoring him, Odysseus commands that Eurylochus distribute six torches as they sail through the dark lair. Scylla, attracted to the light, eats the men holding the torches, allowing the rest of the crew to escape unharmed ("Scylla").

Horrified by Odysseus's willingness to sacrifice his own men, Eurylochus leads a mutiny, subduing and imprisoning the captain. The crew lands the ship on the nearest island, which happens to be the home of the sun god Helios. Despite warnings from Odysseus, Eurylochus kills one of Helios's sacred cows for food ("Mutiny"). Angered by this disrespect, Helios sends Zeus to pass judgement on the crew. The god forces Odysseus to choose between allowing either himself or his remaining men to be killed. Determined to return home, Odysseus ultimately chooses the latter. Zeus spares Odysseus but destroys his ship and kills the rest of his crew ("Thunder Bringer").

==== The Wisdom Saga ====
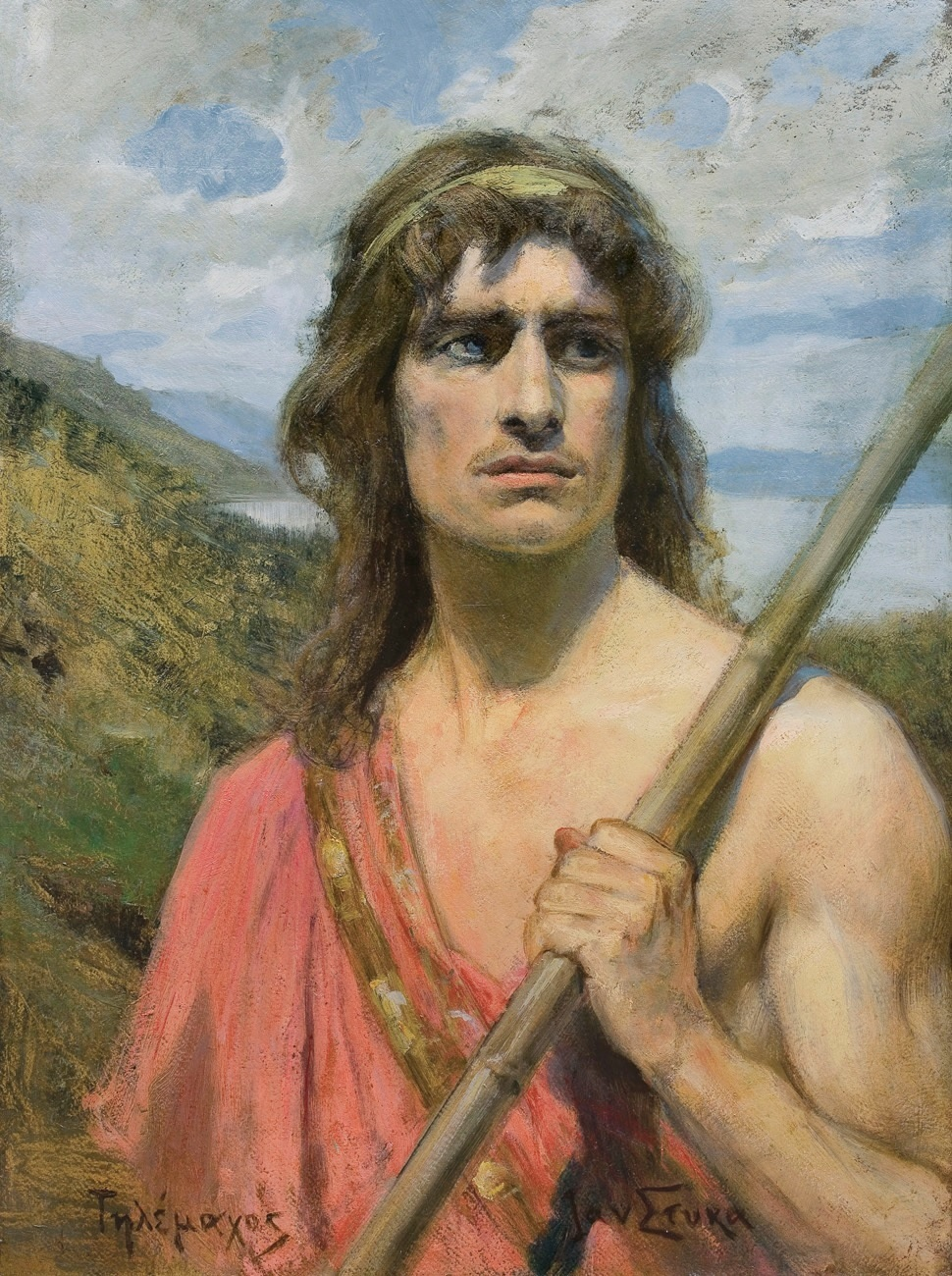
Telemachus, the son of Odysseus, is introduced in The Wisdom Saga.

Seven years later, on Ithaca, Odysseus's son Telemachus is now twenty years old and longs to be a hero like his long-lost father, while also hoping to protect his mother from her increasingly violent suitors, who are vying for the island kingdom's throne ("Legendary"). He stands up to the suitor Antinous to defend his mother's honor, but is badly beaten in a fight until Athena appears and aids him ("Little Wolf"). She later reflects on her relationship with an "old friend" and expresses regret about how it ended. Telemachus, unaware that she is referring to his own father, encourages the goddess to rekindle that friendship ("We'll Be Fine").

Heeding this advice, Athena decides to look through Odysseus's memories to find him and discovers that he has been trapped on the island of Ogygia with the exiled goddess Calypso, who has repeatedly tried to seduce him to no avail. Over the years, Odysseus has become increasingly depressed and desperate to escape the island, finally calling out to Athena for help ("Love in Paradise"). On Mount Olympus, Athena appeals to Zeus, her father, to free Odysseus. Unwilling to do so freely, he decides to host a "game", agreeing to release Odysseus only if Athena successfully argues for his release to five other Olympians: Apollo, Hephaestus, Aphrodite, Ares, Hera. Using her wit and knowledge of each of the Olympians' different personalities, Athena successfully convinces all of them. Zeus becomes enraged at being outwitted, and he strikes Athena with lightning, but she survives and makes a final plea for Odysseus's freedom before collapsing ("God Games").

==== The Vengeance Saga ====
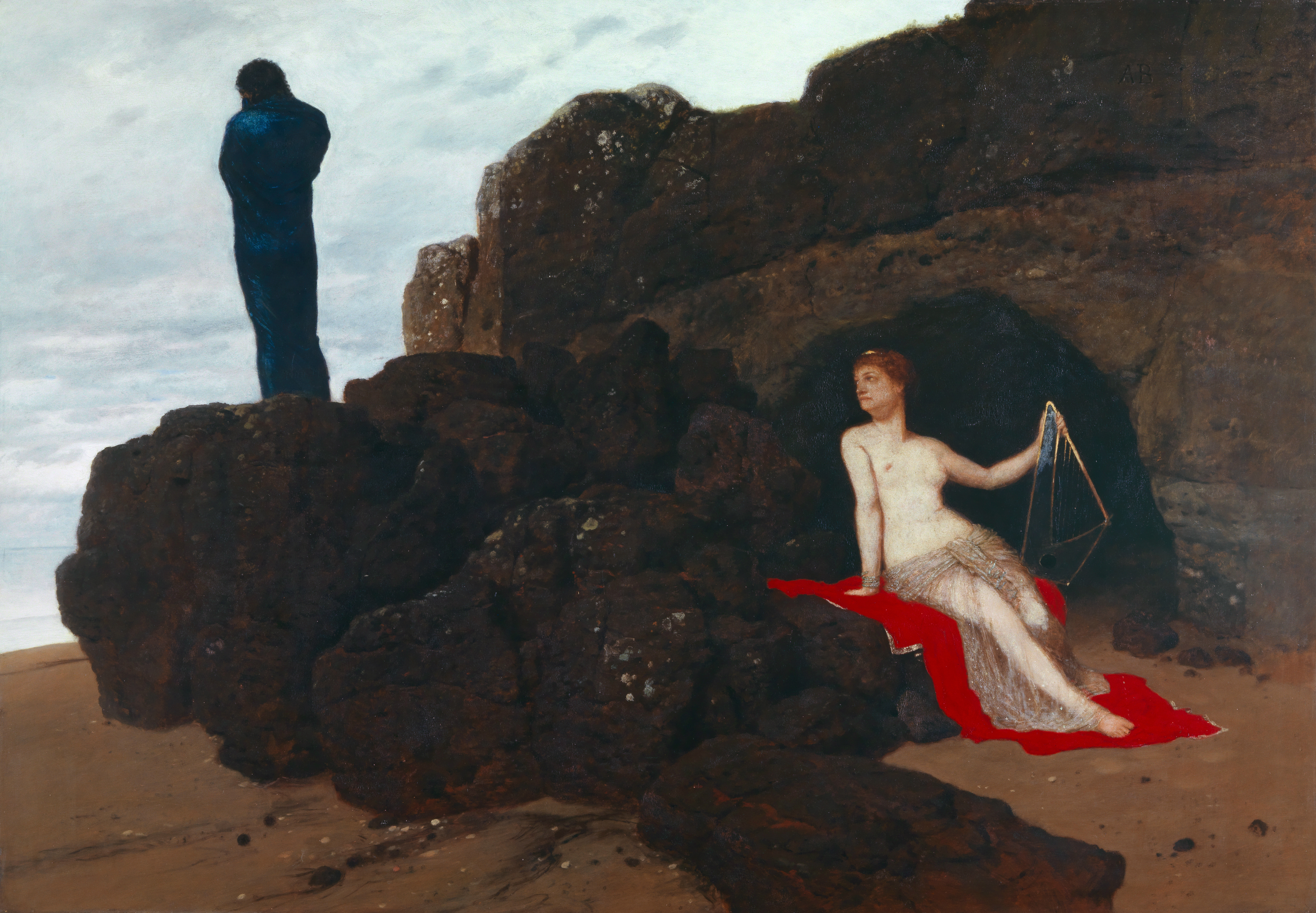
Odysseus leaves Calypso in The Vengeance Saga and makes his final journey home.

After Calypso receives word from Olympus that Odysseus is to be freed, she bids him farewell before he leaves her island, heartbroken that her love for him could never be reciprocated ("Not Sorry For Loving You"). Later, while Odysseus is adrift on a hand-made raft, Hermes reappears and offers guidance on how to return home, also giving him Aeolus's wind bag ("Dangerous"). Odysseus evades the sea monster Charybdis before seeing the shores of Ithaca, where he encounters Poseidon again ("Charybdis"). Poseidon gives Odysseus the ultimatum of either choosing to drown or watching all of Ithaca be submerged by a tidal wave. Odysseus is dragged to the bottom of the ocean ("Get in the Water"), but opens the wind bag one final time to fight back, striking Poseidon with the might of six hundred men as retribution for his six hundred dead comrades. Poseidon tells Odysseus that opening the wind bag and releasing the storm has destroyed his last chance of returning home. Enraged, Odysseus tortures the god by repeatedly stabbing him with his own trident until he relents and ends the storm ("Six Hundred Strike").

==== The Ithaca Saga ====
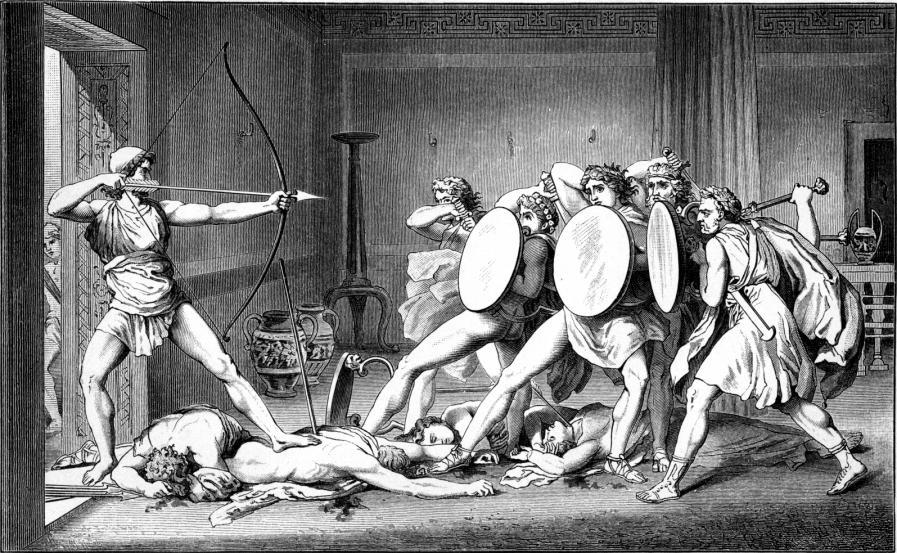
Odysseus's stand against the suitors of Penelope is depicted in The Ithaca Saga.

Back on Ithaca, Penelope sees Poseidon's storm off the coast as a sign of Odysseus's return. She presents her suitors with a nearly impossible challenge: whichever of them can re-string Odysseus's old bow and shoot an arrow through the heads of twelve axes will win her hand in marriage and the throne of Ithaca ("The Challenge"). Soon realizing that Penelope has no intention of letting any of them take the throne, Antinous rallies the suitors to murder Telemachus and rape Penelope, before he is suddenly killed by an arrow ("Hold Them Down"). The shooter reveals himself to be Odysseus, newly returned home and enraged by the suitors' actions and plan. Odysseus quickly massacres the rest of the suitors and ignores their pleas for mercy. Telemachus discovers and joins in as well ("Odysseus").

After the slaughter, Telemachus and Odysseus reunite and begin to reconnect, before Telemachus leaves to tell his mother of Odysseus's return. Athena then reappears to Odysseus, wondering if a kinder and more peaceful world could ever exist, with Odysseus deciding that she can help to create it, although he will likely not live long enough to see it ("I Can't Help but Wonder"). In Penelope's bedchamber, Odysseus finally reunites with his wife. He claims to not be the same person that left her twenty years earlier. Penelope tests him by asking him to move their wedding bed, which only he knew is rooted into the ground, and she proclaims that as long as he remains her husband, she will never stop loving him. ("Would You Fall in Love with Me Again").

== Cast ==
The majority of the musical's cast was chosen through auditions on TikTok.

- Jorge Rivera-Herrans as Odysseus, Lotus-eaters, Polyphemus, Cyclopes, Winions, ensemble
- Luke Holt as Zeus, Elpenor, ensemble
- Armando Julián as Eurylochus, ensemble
- Steven Dookie as Polites
- Teagan Earley as Athena, ensemble
- Ayron Alexander as Perimedes, Antinous, ensemble
- Kira Stone as Aeolus
- Anna Lea as Penelope, Sirens
- Miguel Veloso as Telemachus
- Steven Rodriguez as Poseidon
- Talya Sindel as Circe, ensemble
- Troy Doherty as Hermes, ensemble
- Wanda Herrans as Anticlea
- Mason Olshavsky as Tiresias
- KJ Burkhauser as Scylla
- Barbara Wangui as Calypso
- Brandon McInnis as Apollo
- Mike Rivera as Hephaestus
- Janani K. Jha as Aphrodite
- Earle Gresham Jr. as Ares
- Sarah "POESY" Botelho as Hera
- Diana Rivera-Herrans as Princess Winion
- Dennis Diaz as Eurymachus, ensemble
- Tristan Caldwell as Amphinomus, ensemble
- Jamie Wiltshire as Melanthius, ensemble

== Musical numbers ==
=== Act 1 ===
The Troy Saga (debuted December 25, 2022; re-released July 4, 2024)

- "The Horse and the Infant" – Jorge Rivera-Herrans, Luke Holt, Cast of EPIC: The Musical
- "Just a Man" – Jorge Rivera-Herrans, Cast of EPIC: The Musical
- "Full Speed Ahead" – Jorge Rivera-Herrans, Armando Julián, Steven Dookie, Cast of EPIC: The Musical
- "Open Arms" – Jorge Rivera-Herrans, Steven Dookie
- "Warrior of the Mind" – Jorge Rivera-Herrans, Teagan Earley, Cast of EPIC: The Musical

The Cyclops Saga (debuted January 27, 2023; re-released July 4, 2024)

- "Polyphemus" – Jorge Rivera-Herrans, Armando Julián, Steven Dookie
- "Survive" – Jorge Rivera-Herrans, Steven Dookie, Cast of EPIC: The Musical
- "Remember Them" – Jorge Rivera-Herrans, Armando Julián, Teagan Earley, Cast of EPIC: The Musical
- "My Goodbye" – Jorge Rivera-Herrans, Teagan Earley, Cast of EPIC: The Musical

The Ocean Saga (debuted December 25, 2023)

- "Storm" – Jorge Rivera-Herrans, Armando Julián, Cast of EPIC: The Musical
- "Luck Runs Out" – Jorge Rivera-Herrans, Armando Julián, Cast of EPIC: The Musical
- "Keep Your Friends Close" – Jorge Rivera-Herrans, Kira Stone, Anna Lea, Miguel Veloso, Armando Julián, Steven Rodriguez, Cast of EPIC: The Musical
- "Ruthlessness" – Jorge Rivera-Herrans, Steven Rodriguez, Cast of EPIC: The Musical

The Circe Saga (debuted February 14, 2024)

- "Puppeteer" – Jorge Rivera-Herrans, Armando Julián, Talya Sindel, Cast of EPIC: The Musical
- "Wouldn’t You Like" – Jorge Rivera-Herrans, TROY, Cast of EPIC: The Musical
- "Done For" – Jorge Rivera-Herrans, Talya Sindel
- "There Are Other Ways" – Jorge Rivera-Herrans, Talya Sindel, Cast of EPIC: The Musical

The Underworld Saga (debuted April 26, 2024)

- "The Underworld" – Jorge Rivera-Herrans, Steven Dookie, Wanda Herrans, Cast of EPIC: The Musical
- "No Longer You" – Jorge Rivera-Herrans, Mason Olshavsky
- "Monster" – Jorge Rivera-Herrans, Cast of EPIC: The Musical

=== Act 2 ===
The Thunder Saga (debuted July 4, 2024)

- "Suffering" – Jorge Rivera-Herrans, Anna Lea
- "Different Beast" – Jorge Rivera-Herrans, Anna Lea, Cast of EPIC: The Musical
- "Scylla" – Jorge Rivera-Herrans, KJ Burkhauser, Armando Julián, Cast of EPIC: The Musical
- "Mutiny" – Jorge Rivera-Herrans, Armando Julián, Cast of EPIC: The Musical
- "Thunder Bringer" – Jorge Rivera-Herrans, Luke Holt, Anna Lea, Armando Julián, Cast of EPIC: The Musical

The Wisdom Saga (debuted August 30, 2024)

- "Legendary" – Miguel Veloso, Ayron Alexander, Cast of EPIC: The Musical
- "Little Wolf" – Ayron Alexander, Teagan Earley, Miguel Veloso, Cast of EPIC: The Musical
- "We’ll Be Fine" – Teagan Earley, Miguel Veloso
- "Love in Paradise" – Jorge Rivera-Herrans, Barbara Wangui, Teagan Earley, Kira Stone, Steven Rodriguez, Talya Sindel, Mason Olshavsky, KJ Burkhauser, Armando Julián, Steven Dookie, Wanda Herrans, Cast of EPIC: The Musical
- "God Games" – Teagan Earley, Luke Holt, Brandon McInnis, Mike Rivera, Janani K. Jha, Earle Gresham Jr., POESY, Cast of EPIC: The Musical

The Vengeance Saga (debuted October 31, 2024)

- "Not Sorry for Loving You" – Jorge Rivera-Herrans, Barbara Wangui, Cast of EPIC: The Musical
- "Dangerous" – Jorge Rivera-Herrans, TROY, Diana Rivera-Herrans
- "Charybdis" – Jorge Rivera-Herrans
- "Get in the Water" – Jorge Rivera-Herrans, Steven Rodriguez, Steven Dookie, Armando Julián, Wanda Herrans, Cast of EPIC: The Musical
- "Six Hundred Strike" – Jorge Rivera-Herrans, Steven Rodriguez, Cast of EPIC: The Musical

The Ithaca Saga (debuted December 25, 2024)

- "The Challenge" – Anna Lea, Cast of EPIC: The Musical
- "Hold Them Down" – Ayron Alexander, Cast of EPIC: The Musical
- "Odysseus" – Jorge Rivera-Herrans, Jamie Wiltshire, Dennis Diaz, Tristan Caldwell, Miguel Veloso, Cast of EPIC: The Musical
- "I Can’t Help but Wonder" – Jorge Rivera-Herrans, Miguel Veloso, Teagan Earley
- "Would You Fall in Love with Me Again" – Jorge Rivera-Herrans, Anna Lea

== Production ==
Epic: The Musical began development in 2019 as Jorge Rivera-Herrans's senior thesis at the University of Notre Dame, but gained widespread popularity in 2021 when he posted videos documenting his creative process on video-creating app TikTok. The first installment of the musical, The Troy Saga, was released on December 25, 2022, being followed shortly thereafter by The Cyclops Saga the following month, both under BRP Records

To officially manage all future releases and merchandise related to the project, Rivera-Herrans independently founded the company Winion Entertainment, under which the musical's third installment, The Ocean Saga, was released in December 2023. Rivera-Herrans re-recorded the first and second sagas under this new entity and released the new versions on July 4, 2024, at which point the original versions were made unavailable. The ninth and final installment, The Ithaca Saga, was released on December 25, 2024.

== Analysis ==
The series is divided into nine concept albums, referred to as "sagas", consisting of three to five songs each. The sagas each portray a narrative arc of the Odyssey. The nine sagas comprise two acts, with each act representing half of the musical.

The characters in Epic are portrayed by multiple singers, with Rivera-Herrans portraying Odysseus, the main protagonist. In developing the musical, he took inspiration from the 1936 composition Peter and the Wolf, which identifies different characters using unique instruments. Using this technique, Epic uses symbolism through representative instruments, with Odysseus being represented with guitar music, Athena being represented with a piano, and Aeolus using choral vocals and flutes. Telemachus is represented by both a guitar and a piano, indicating influences from both Odysseus as his father and Athena as his mentor. This technique is also subverted to provide foreshadowing, such as in the song "Suffering", wherein Penelope is not represented by her characteristic viola, hinting that the singer is actually a siren in disguise. Magic is represented in the musical through electronic music, with electronic instruments such as synthesizers becoming more common as the story incorporates more divine and godly elements.

The songs of the musical span multiple genres, including pop, electronic, rock, orchestral, and world music. The series takes musical and narrative inspiration from various sources, including the works of Lin-Manuel Miranda, as well as anime tropes and video game mechanics. Inspired by video games, the sagas serve as "levels" in the narrative, often building up to dramatic "boss battles" at the end. The story of the musical has creative differences from the original Odyssey, with a defining theme of the adaptation, Odysseus's moral dilemmas, being absent in the source material. Death is also a consistent theme in the musical adaptation, with each consecutive saga becoming lyrically darker to represent the pain felt by Odysseus because of the loss he suffers.

The musical makes use of leitmotifs to reinforce thematic parallels throughout the story, such as the "Danger is Nearby" motif, which is frequently used to foreshadow incoming danger. Lyrics from previous songs are also often repeated throughout the musical to reinforce narrative themes, such as the lyric "When does a man become a monster?", first appearing in The Troy Saga, or the lyric "Ruthlessness is mercy upon ourselves", first sung by the main antagonist Poseidon, both being frequently invoked throughout the first act.

== Reception ==
Within the first week of release, The Troy Saga surpassed three million streams, reaching second-place on the Billboard Cast Album Chart (behind Hamilton) and becoming the number one Soundtrack Album on iTunes on the day of release. Since then, Epic has had consistent popularity, with each saga reaching the number one spot in the week of its release. By December 2024, Epic had 1.6 million monthly listeners on Spotify.

Epic has been praised for its emotional depth and character development, with reviewers describing Rivera-Herrans's voice as highly emotive and the story as heartwrenching.

Reviewer Eliana Hernandez described Rivera-Herrans's singing as "passionate", saying that he "accurately captures the essence and complexity of a man willing to do practically anything to make it back home to his wife, son and kingdom even if it forever changes the person he is". She also praised the album's worldbuilding and effective abridgement of the source material, saying that despite the creative liberties taken for brevity, the songs still provide emotional impact. In a review of the musical, the website Xavier Newswire described The Wisdom Saga as Rivera-Herrans's best work, praising its character depth and describing the songs "Love in Paradise" and "God Games" as simultaneously "epic" and "gut wrenching".

Reviewers have drawn attention to the fact that the musical found its cast entirely online, and that all of the marketing is done on social media. Eliana Hernandez said that this method of social media-driven production "honors the original source material while transforming the story into a medium that will speak to a more contemporary audience". Reviewer Wyn Caudle described the musical's integration with social media as a unique and new form of media production.

== Future ==
In December 2024, it was announced that two video games based on Epic were currently in production, as well as ongoing plans for the creation of an animated film, a stage adaptation, and a third video game. In April 2026, it was announced that Jerry Bruckheimer would produce the animated film in collaboration with Atlantic Music Group.

In June 2025, Jorge Rivera-Herrans announced he was beginning work on a second musical titled Ilium, inspired by the other Homeric epic, the Iliad.

== Chart performance ==
Title	Details	Peak chart positions	
Title	Details	US Cast	US
The Troy Saga (original release)	Released: December 25, 2022; Format: streaming	2	—
The Cyclops Saga (original release)	Released: January 27, 2023; Format: streaming	2	—
The Ocean Saga	Released: December 25, 2023; Format: streaming	1	—
The Circe Saga	Released: February 14, 2024; Format: streaming	1	—
The Underworld Saga	Released: April 26, 2024; Format: streaming	—	—
The Thunder Saga	Released: July 4, 2024; Format: streaming	1	—
The Troy Saga (re-release)	Released: July 4, 2024; Format: streaming	2	—
The Cyclops Saga (re-release)	Released: July 4, 2024; Format: streaming	2	—
The Wisdom Saga	Released: August 30, 2024; Format: streaming	1	71
The Vengeance Saga	Released: October 31, 2024; Format: streaming	—	122
The Ithaca Saga	Released: December 25, 2024; Format: streaming	—	130

== See also ==
- Glam Slam Ulysses, a 1993 musical based on the Odyssey
- The Golden Apple, a 1954 musical based on the Iliad and Odyssey
- Home Sweet Homer, a 1975 musical based on the Odyssey
