= Arcesius =

Mythical king of Ithaca

In Greek mythology, Arcesius, Arceisius, Arkeisios or Arcisius (Ancient Greek: Ἀρκείσιος) was the son of either Zeus or Cephalus, and king in Ithaca.

== Mythology ==
According to scholia on the Odyssey, Arcesius' parents were Zeus and Euryodeia; Ovid also writes of Arcesius as a son of Zeus. Other sources make him a son of Cephalus. Aristotle in his lost work The State of the Ithacians cited a myth according to which Cephalus was instructed by an oracle to mate with the first female being he should encounter if he wanted to have offspring; Cephalus mated with a she-bear, who then transformed into a human woman and bore him a son, Arcesius. Hyginus makes Arcesius a son of Cephalus and Procris, while Eustathius and the exegetical scholia to the Iliad report a version according to which Arcesius was a grandson of Cephalus through Cillus or Celeus.

Zeus made Arcesius' line one of "only sons": his only son was Laertes, whose only son was Odysseus (albeit siring a daughter named Ctimene), whose only son was Telemachus. Arcesius's wife (and thus mother of Laertes) was Chalcomedusa.

== Arcesius line ==
Arceisiades (Ancient Greek: Ἀρκεισιάδης) was a patronymic from Arcesius, which Laertes as well as his son, Odysseus, is designated by.

== Namesakes ==
Of another Arcesius, an architect, Vitruvius (vii, introduction) notes: "Arcesius, on the Corinthian order proportions, and on the Ionic order temple of Aesculapius at Tralles, which it is said that he built with his own hands."
