= Eurylochus =

Member of Odysseus' crew

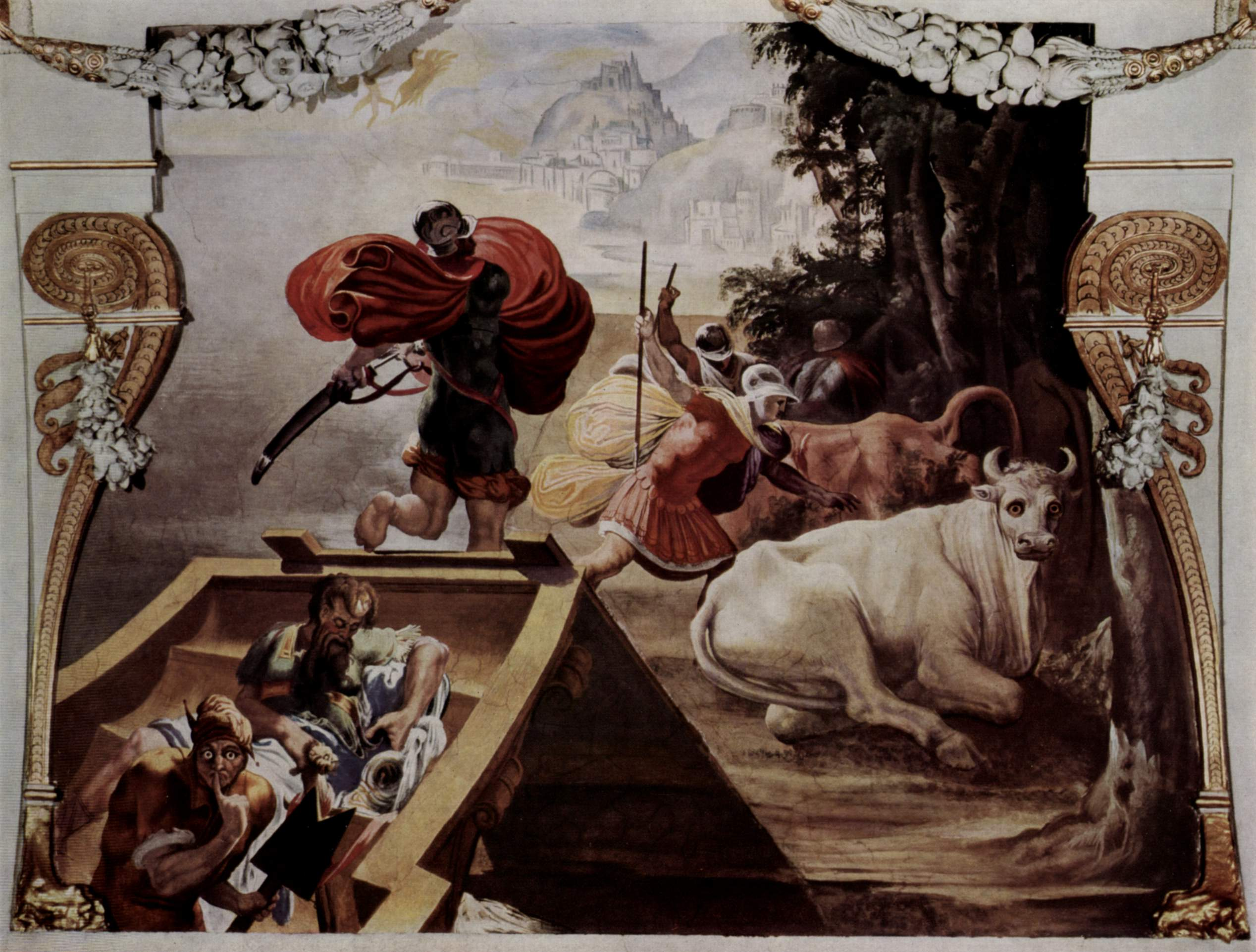
- Eurylochus killing the cattle of Helios

In-universe information
- Home: Kingdom of Ithaca
- Nationality: Greek

In Greek mythology, Eurylochus (/jəˈrɪləkəs/; Ancient Greek: Εὐρύλοχος, romanized: Eurúlokhos, lit. 'wide ambush' or 'broad company of soldiers') appears in Homer's Odyssey as second-in-command of Odysseus' ship during the return to Ithaca after the Trojan War. He is portrayed as an unpleasant, cowardly individual who undermines Odysseus and stirs up trouble.

== Family ==
Eustathius of Thessalonica in his commentary of the Odyssey, equated Eurylochus with the unnamed husband of the sister of Odysseus, Ctimene.

== Mythology ==
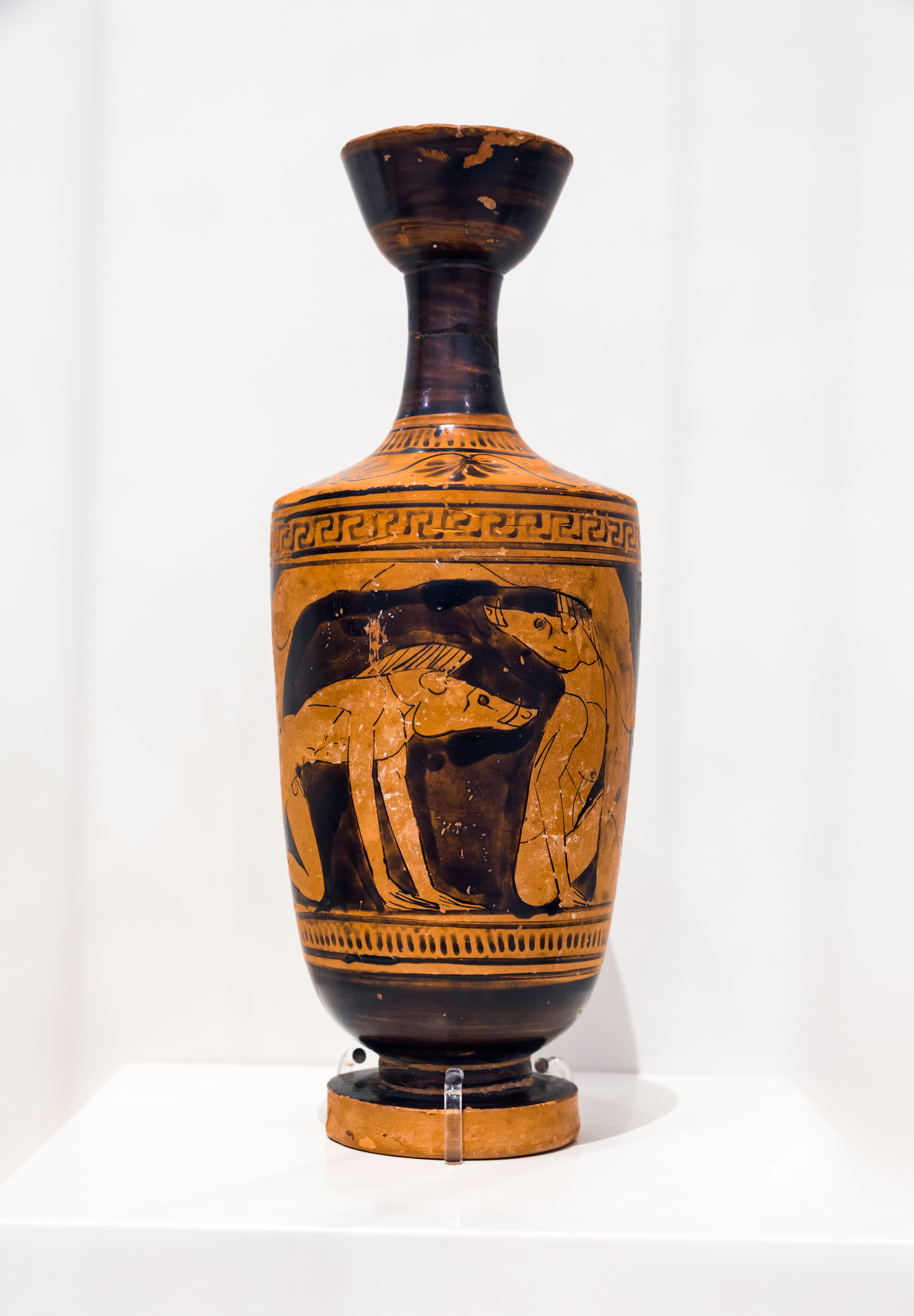
Odysseus' crew are turned into swine, red-figure lekythos circa 480-460 BC, from Eretria.

When Odysseus and 12 of his crew, including Eurylochus, came into the port of island of the Cyclops, the Cyclops Polyphemus seized and confined them. Along with the Ithacan king and six others namely: Lycaon, Amphialos, Alkimos, Amphidamas and Antilochus, Eurylochus survived the slaughter of his six companions by the monster.

When the ship stops on Aeaea, home of Circe the goddess-sorceress, daughter of the sun god Helios and the Oceanid nymph Perse, Eurylochus and Odysseus draw lots to lead a group of twenty-two men to explore the island. Eurylochus is chosen. After the crew spots a column of smoke, Eurylochus leads his expedition towards the source. They near a palace surrounded with wild but magically benign animals. Inside the palace is Circe singing, and (led by Polites) all rush in, except for Eurylochus who suspects her treachery. When she turns the rest of the expedition into pigs, Eurylochus escapes and warns Odysseus and the portion of the crew who stayed on the ship, thus enabling Odysseus to attempt a rescue. When Odysseus goes to save his men, Eurylochus refuses to guide him and urges him to escape and leave the men to their fate.

When Odysseus returns from Circe, having rescued the men, Eurylochus insults Odysseus. Odysseus considers killing him but the crewmen drag them apart. After their reconciliation, Circe advises Odysseus to see the prophet Tiresias for advice to get back home. Tiresias instructs Odysseus not to touch the cattle of Helios, but Eurylochus persuades the hungry and mutinous crew to kill and eat some of the god's cattle. As punishment, Odysseus's ship is destroyed, and all of his crew, including Eurylochus, are killed in a storm sent by Zeus. Only Odysseus survives.

== In popular culture ==
Eurylochus appears in Epic: The Musical (2024) written by Jorge Rivera-Herrans. Eurylochus is portrayed by Armando Julián. He closely mirrors the original version except he is the one who kills the cattle of Helios without total help from the crew (though the crew did attack Odysseus with Eurylochus). Polites is already dead as well during their attack from Circe.

In The Odyssey (2026), directed by Christopher Nolan, Eurylochus is portrayed by Himesh Patel. The role of Eurylochus in the film closely mirrors his counterpart in the original poem, with only minor differences, such as Circe turning Eurylochus into a swine along with the rest of Odysseus's men.
