= Chalcomedusa =

Ithacan queen in Greek mythology

In Greek Mythology, Chalcomedusa (Ancient Greek: Χαλκομέδουσα, romanized: Khalkomédousa) was an Ithacan queen as the wife of King Arcesius and mother of Laertes, the father of the hero Odysseus.

== Etymology ==
Her name, chalcos (meaning both "copper" and "bronze") and medousa ("guardian" or "protectress"), identifies her as the protector of Bronze Age metal-working technology.
