= Euryodeia =

Woman in Greek mythology

In Greek Mythology, Euryodeia (Ancient Greek: Εὐρυοδεία) or Euryodia (Εὐρυοδία) was the mother of King Arcesius of Ithaca by Zeus. In some accounts, Arcesius instead was called the son of Cephalus by Procris or a she-bear who was transformed into a woman.
