= Eupeithes =

Figure in Greek mythology

In Greek mythology, Eupeithes /juˈpaɪˌθiːz/ (Εὐπείθης Eupeíthēs) was the father of Antinous, the leader of the suitors of Penelope. After his son's death at the hands of Odysseus, Eupeithes tried to revolt against his rule. He was killed by Odysseus's father, Laertes. Evidently, he had forgotten the favor Odysseus had done for him years before when he committed a piratical raid on Cephallenia. Odysseus protected him from vengeful Cephallenians who wanted to kill him. Yet he let his son lead the suitors in destroying Odysseus's home.

His name means "obedient".

== See also ==
- List of Greek deities
