= Laertes (father of Odysseus) =

Legendary king of Ithaca

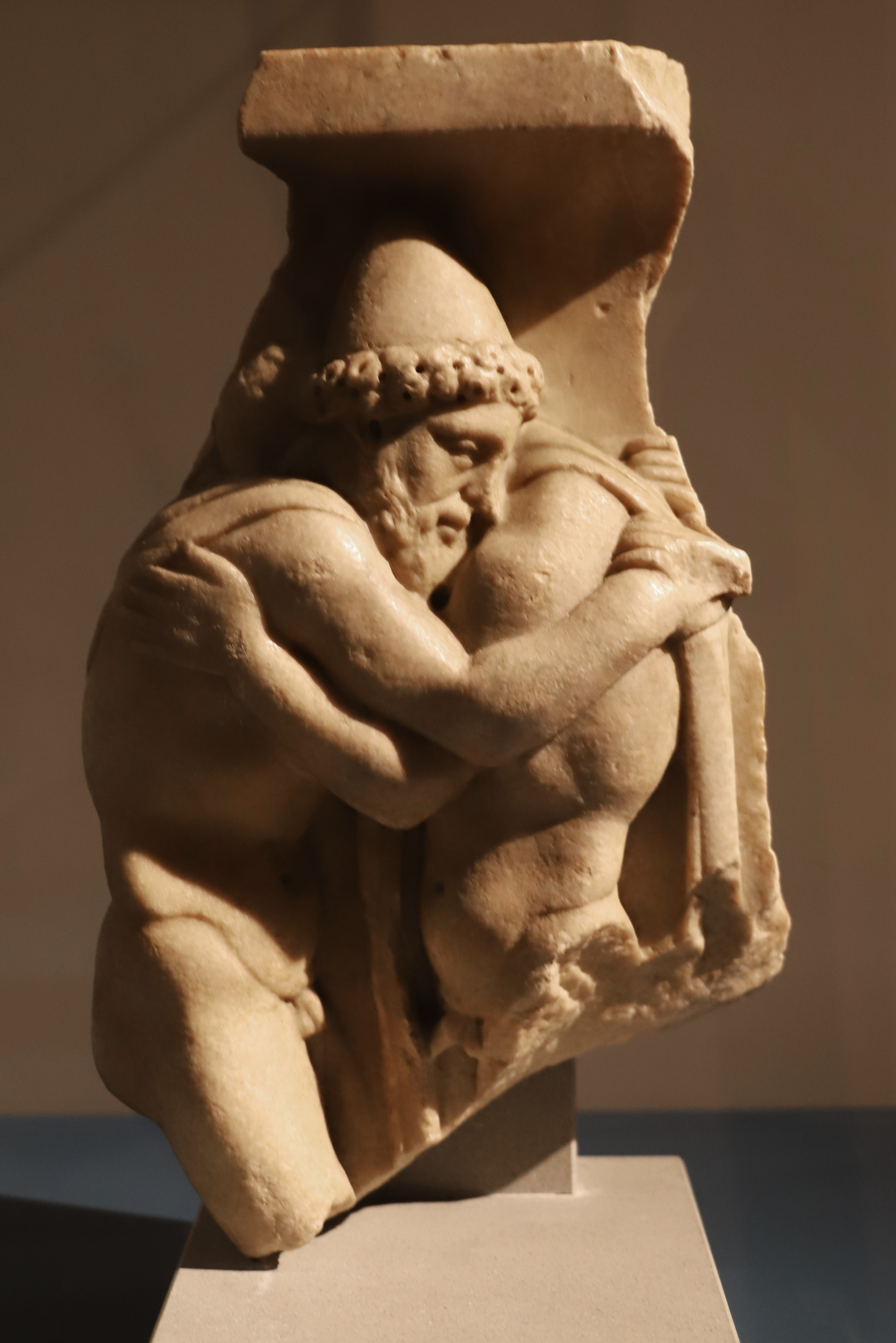
Fragment of a Roman sarcophagus with the reunion of Odysseus and Laertes, 150s AD, Museo Barracco.

In Greek mythology, Laertes (/leɪˈɜːrtiːz/; Ancient Greek: Λαέρτης, romanized: Laértēs Greek pronunciation: [laː.ér.tɛːs]; also spelled Laërtes) was the king of the Cephallenians, an ethnic group who lived both on the Ionian Islands and on the mainland. He presumably inherited the kingdom from his father Arcesius and grandfather Cephalus. His realm included Ithaca and surrounding islands, and perhaps even the neighboring part of the mainland of other Greek city-states. Laertes was also an Argonaut, and a participant in the hunt for the Calydonian Boar.

== Family ==
Laertes was the son of Arcesius and Chalcomedusa; and the father of Odysseus (who was thus called Laertiádēs, Λαερτιάδης, "son of Laertes") and Ctimene by his wife Anticlea, daughter of the thief Autolycus. According to Hyginus's Fabulae, Laertes was not Odysseus's true father; rather, it was Sisyphus, who had seduced Anticlea.

== Mythology ==
=== The Odyssey ===
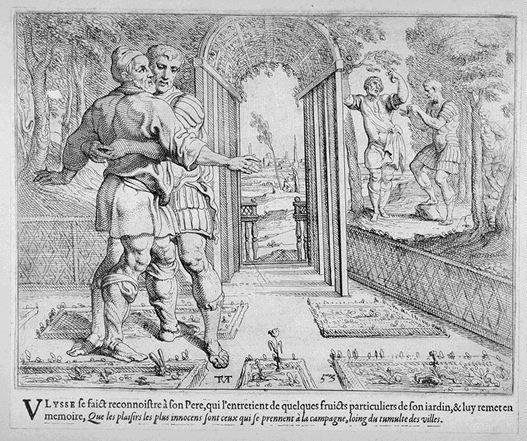
Odysseus meets his father Laertes on his return to Ithaca (Theodoor van Thulden, 1600)

Laertes stays away from Odysseus' home while Odysseus is gone. He keeps to himself on his farm, overcome with grief over Odysseus' absence and alone after his wife, Anticlea, died from grief herself. Odysseus finally comes to see Laertes after he has killed all the suitors competing for Penelope. He finds his father spading a plant, looking old and tired and filled with sadness. Odysseus keeps his identity to himself at first, identifying himself only as Quarrelman, only son of King Allwoes (in the Fitzgerald translation of Homer), but when he sees how disappointed Laertes is to learn that this "stranger" has no news of his son, Odysseus reveals himself, and proves his identity by reciting all the trees he received from Laertes when he was a boy. This emphasis on the land of Ithaca itself perhaps signifies that Odysseus has finally reconnected with his homeland, and his journey is over.

Laertes had trained Odysseus in husbandry. After their reunion, the two of them go to Odysseus' home to fend off the families of the dead suitors. Athena infuses vigour into Laertes, so he can help Odysseus. He kills Eupeithes, father of Antinous.

=== Other accounts ===
According to Dictys Cretensis, Laertes died three years after Odysseus' return.
