= Jorge Rivera–Herrans =

Puerto Rican songwriter and musician

Jorge "Jay" Rivera-Herrans is a Puerto Rican songwriter and musician. Rivera-Herrans wrote the musicals Stupid Humans in 2019 and later Epic: The Musical. The latter became a social media success as it was released online from January 2021 to December 2024.

== Early life and education ==
Rivera grew up in Dorado, Puerto Rico where he attended the Tasis School graduating in 2016. Rivera then attended the University of Notre Dame. Initially, pre-med, Rivera-Herrans later majored in theatre and economics. He obtained his bachelors degree from the university in 2020 and secured The Career Launch Fellowship for emerging artists.

== Acting career ==
While in university, Rivera acted in numerous plays at the South Bend Civic Theatre. In 2018, Rivera appeared as the lead in the performance of Lin-Manuel Miranda's In the Heights. The same year, he appeared in as lead actor in The Great Writer.

== Writing career ==
=== Stupid Humans ===
In 2019, Rivera wrote a musical called Stupid Humans. The musical performed at the university's DeBartolo Performing Arts Center was the first original musical to be performed at Notre Dame. In 2023, the musical was adapted by Matt Hawkins and performed at the South Bend Civic Theatre as My Heart Says Go.

=== Epic: The Musical ===
In 2019, Jorge Rivera–Herrans began developing Epic: The Musical began based on the Odyssey for his senior thesis at Notre Dame. The musical gained widespread popularity beginning in 2021 when he posted videos documenting his creative process on TikTok. The majority of the musical's cast was chosen through auditions on TikTok, with Rivera-Herrans portraying the protagonist, Odysseus.

In early 2023, the company that Rivera-Herrans signed to help distribute and release the albums filed a lawsuit claiming copyright over the project. In response, Rivera-Herrans filed a countersuit, citing ownership as the sole writer, head music director, and lead vocal contributor. The lawsuits halted work on the project for a period.

The first installment of the musical, The Troy Saga, was released on December 25, 2022. Within the first week of its release, The Troy Saga surpassed three million streams, reaching second-place on the Billboard Cast Album Chart (behind Hamilton) and becoming the number one Soundtrack Album on iTunes on the day of release. By December 2024, Epic had 1.6 million monthly listeners on Spotify.

== Critical reception ==
=== Stupid Humans ===
Of his musical, Stupid Humans, the South Bend Tribune said "music director Daniel Padilla [...] and Rivera-Herrans' use of hip-hop beats for many of the rhythm parts gives the songs a contemporary sound and energy, while Rivera-Herrans witty and sometimes touching lyrics reveal character and advance the story". In 2019, the musical obtained an honorable mention at the National Alliance of Musical Theatre's Annual Festival of New Musicals.

=== Epic: the Musical ===
Writing for Soundsphere, Océane Adams said "Jorge has a full-bodied, steady voice that will slam you to your knees if you let it. That accompanied with his incredible writing and producing skills make it impossible not to be positively moved by this song, and it's an absolute must listen to." Reviewer Eliana Hernandez, writing in The Ticker, described Rivera-Herrans's singing as "passionate", saying that he "accurately captures the essence and complexity of a man willing to do practically anything to make it back home to his wife, son and kingdom even if it forever changes the person he is". In a review of the musical, the website Xavier Newswire described The Wisdom Saga as Rivera-Herrans's best work, praising its character depth and describing the songs "Love in Paradise" and "God Games" as simultaneously "epic" and "gut wrenching".
