= Ctimene =

Daughter of Laertes, sister of Odysseus

In Greek mythology, Ctimene (/ˈtɪmɪni/ TIM-in-ee; Ancient Greek: Κτιμένη, romanized: Ktiménē, lit. 'settled', 'founded' or 'built'; Ancient Greek pronunciation: [ktiménɛː]) was an Ithacan princess as the daughter of King Laertes and Anticlea.

== Mythology ==
=== In the Odyssey ===
In book 15 of the Odyssey, the swineherd Eumaeus refers to Ctimene as the daughter of Laertes and Anticlea, and as the younger sister of Odysseus. Ctimene grew up with Eumaeus. She was married off in the isle of Same for a massive bride price.

=== Other accounts ===
Medieval scholar Eustathius of Thessalonica in his commentary of the Odyssey, equated the unnamed husband of Ctimene with Odysseus companion, Eurylochus.
