= Polites (friend of Odysseus) =

Minor character in the Odyssey

In Greek mythology, Polites (Ancient Greek: Πολίτης, romanized: Polítēs), the friend and crewmate of King Odysseus, is a minor character in the eighth-century BC epic poem Odyssey, attributed to Homer. Like all of Odysseus' crewmates, he died on the journey back home and never reached Ithaca.

== Mythology ==
=== The Odyssey ===
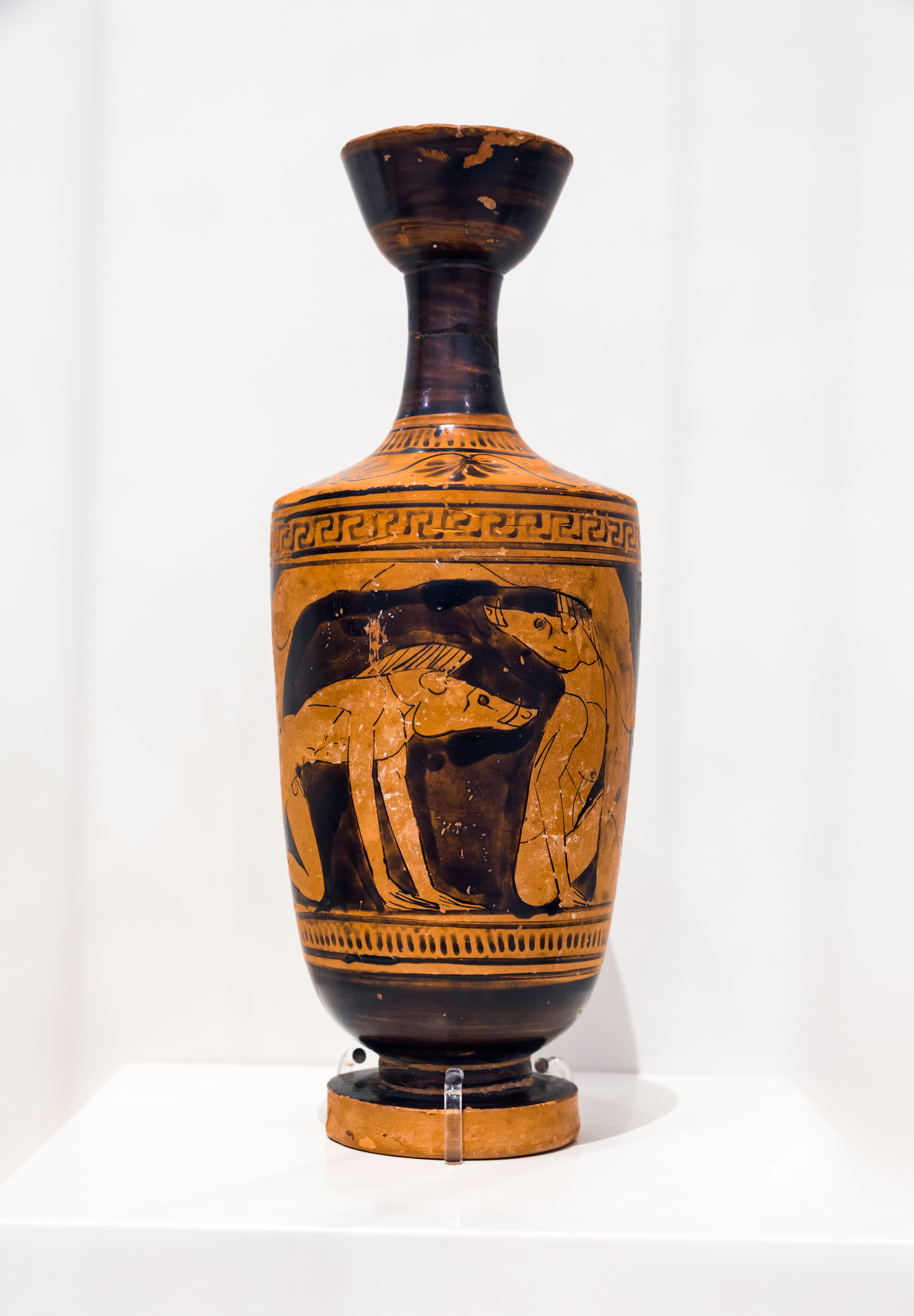
Odysseus' crew turned into pigs, red-figure lekythos c. 480-460 BC from Eretria, National Archaeological Museum of Greece.

Polites was a member of Odysseus's crew, sailing back to Ithaca after the end of the Trojan War. Odysseus refers to him as his dearest friend, though he is only mentioned twice. Polites was part of Eurylochus's scouting group that found Circe's house while exploring her island, and he was the one who encouraged the others to ask for help from her; Circe warmly received the men and offered them hospitality, but subsequently turned them all (except Eurylochus) into pigs until Odysseus forced her to change them back.

Polites eventually perished during the journey like all the other crewmates, as Odysseus was the only one to survive and reach Ithaca; it is unclear whether he was one of the six eaten by Scylla or struck by the lightning bolt that Zeus hurled at Odysseus's ship after his men devoured the sacred cows of the Sun god.

=== Other narratives ===
Polites features more prominently in some versions of the folk tale known as The Hero of Temesa, which recounts the tale of one of Odysseus's crew (in some sources unnamed, but in others, including in the retelling by Strabo, identified as Polites) who was killed on the island of Temesa and returned as a vengeful ghost. Various sources give different accounts of the death—some say he was stoned after raping a woman, others simply claim he was murdered by the locals—but in all versions, the ghost threatened the populace and extracted a high tribute in exchange for a more peaceful coexistence.

This went on until he was defeated by a visitor to the island, sometimes identified as Euthymus of Locri, a boxer and Olympic victor. Because the ghost is sometimes described as wearing a wolfskin, scholar David Ogden speculates that "we are probably dealing with a monster that is mixanthropic: partly human and partly animal, a wolf-man..." and thus an early classical example of a werewolf story.

== In popular culture ==
Polites appears as a character of Epic: The Musical, a sung-through adaptation of The Odyssey created by musician Jorge Rivera-Herrans. Steven Dookie provides the voice of Polites. In Epic: the musical, Polites perishes from being smashed by Polyphemus' club.
