= Anticlea =

Mother of Odysseus

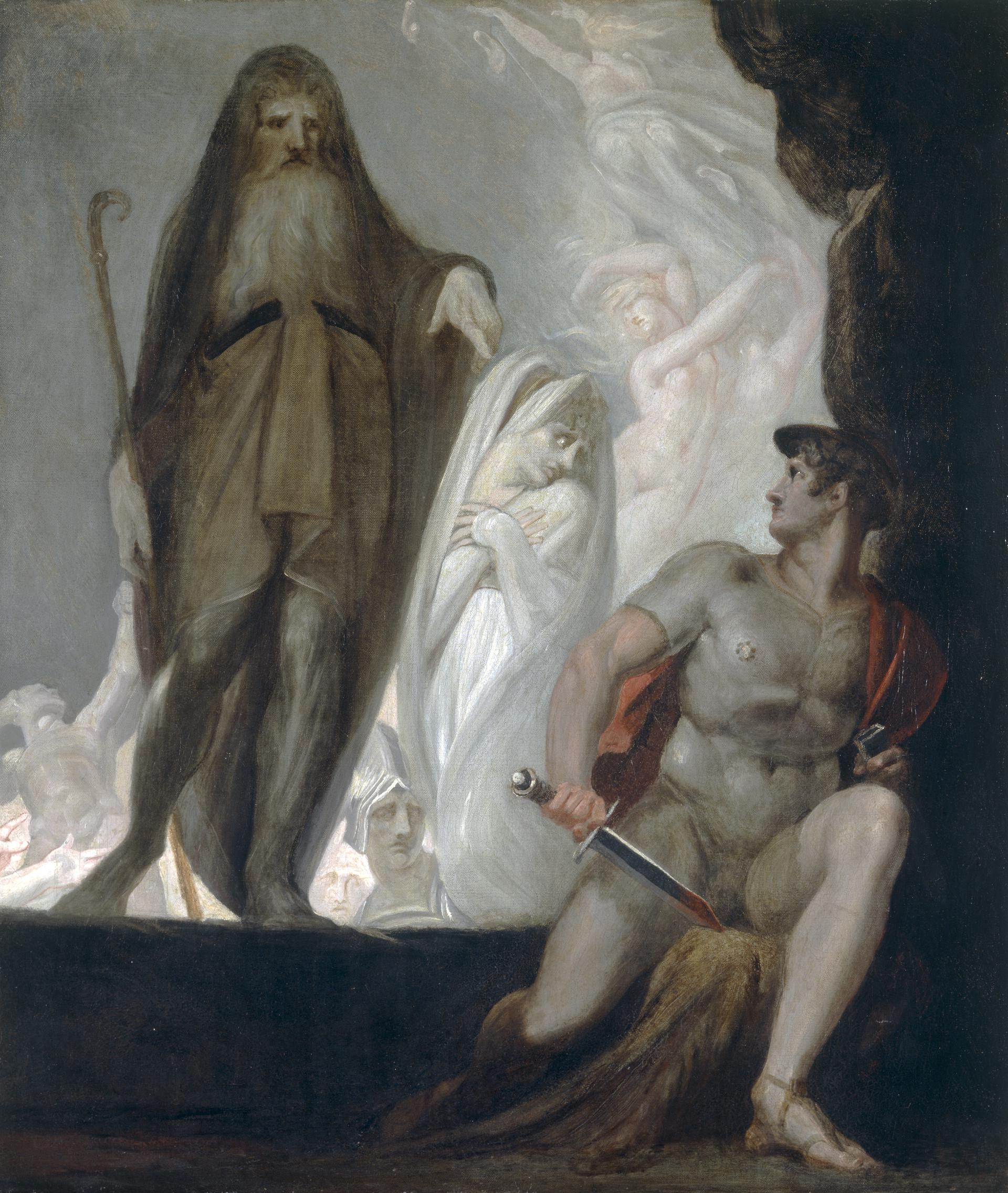
A painting of Tiresias (left) with Anticlea by his side in the Underworld by Henry Fuseli.

In Greek mythology, Anticlea or Anticlia (/ˌæntɪˈkliːə/; Ancient Greek: Ἀντίκλεια, romanized: Antíkleia, lit. 'against fame') was a queen of Ithaca as the wife of King Laërtes and the Granddaughter of the God Hermes.

== Family ==
Anticlea was the daughter of Autolycus and Amphithea. The divine trickster and messenger of the gods, Hermes, was her paternal grandfather. Anticlea was the mother of Odysseus by Laërtes (though some say by Sisyphus). Ctimene was also her daughter by her husband Laertes.

== Mythology ==
=== Early years ===
According to Callimachus, when she was young, Anticlea served the goddess Artemis, and accompanied her in hunting, bearing arrow and quiver.

According to some later sources, including a fragment of Aeschylus' lost tragedy The Judgment of Arms, Odysseus was the child of Anticlea by Sisyphus, not Laërtes. In this version of the story, Autolycus, an infamous trickster, stole Sisyphus' cattle. At some point, Sisyphus recognized his cattle while on a visit to Autolycus and subsequently seduced Anticlea, Autolycus' daughter. Odysseus was the result of this union, which took place before Anticlea's marriage to Laërtes. When Anticlea was brought to a place about the Alalcomeneum in Boeotia, she delivered Odysseus. Later on, her son called the city of Ithaca by the same name, to renew the memory of the place in which he had been born.

=== Odyssey ===
In Book XI of the Odyssey, Odysseus makes a trip to the underworld to seek the advice of the dead prophet Tiresias. In the underworld, he encounters many spirits, among them is that of his mother, Anticlea. Initially, he rebuffs her since he is waiting for the prophet to approach.

After speaking with Tiresias, however, Odysseus allows his mother to come near and lets her speak. She asks him why he is in the underworld while alive, and he tells her about his various troubles and failed attempts to get home. Then he asks her how she died and inquires about his family at home. She tells him that she died of grief, longing for him while he was at war. Anticlea also says that Laërtes (Odysseus' father) "grieves continually" for Odysseus and lives in a hovel in the countryside, clad in rags and sleeping on the floor. Anticlea further describes the condition of Odysseus' wife Penelope and son Telemachus.

Penelope has not yet remarried but is overwhelmed with sadness and longing for her husband while Telemachus acts as magistrate for Odysseus' properties. Odysseus attempts to embrace his mother three times but discovers that she is incorporeal, and his arms simply pass through her. She explains that this is how all ghosts are, and he expresses great sorrow.

In some accounts, Anticleia killed herself on hearing a false report about her son from Nauplius.

The encounter between Odysseus and his mother in the underworld is also the concept of a work by the Northern Irish poet Michael Longley, titled Anticleia.
