= Where Troy Once Stood =

Book by Iman Wilkens

- Author: Iman Jacob Wilkens
- Language: English
- Subject: Trojan War
- Genre: Non-fiction
- Publication date: 1990
- Publication place: United Kingdom
- Pages: 365 pages

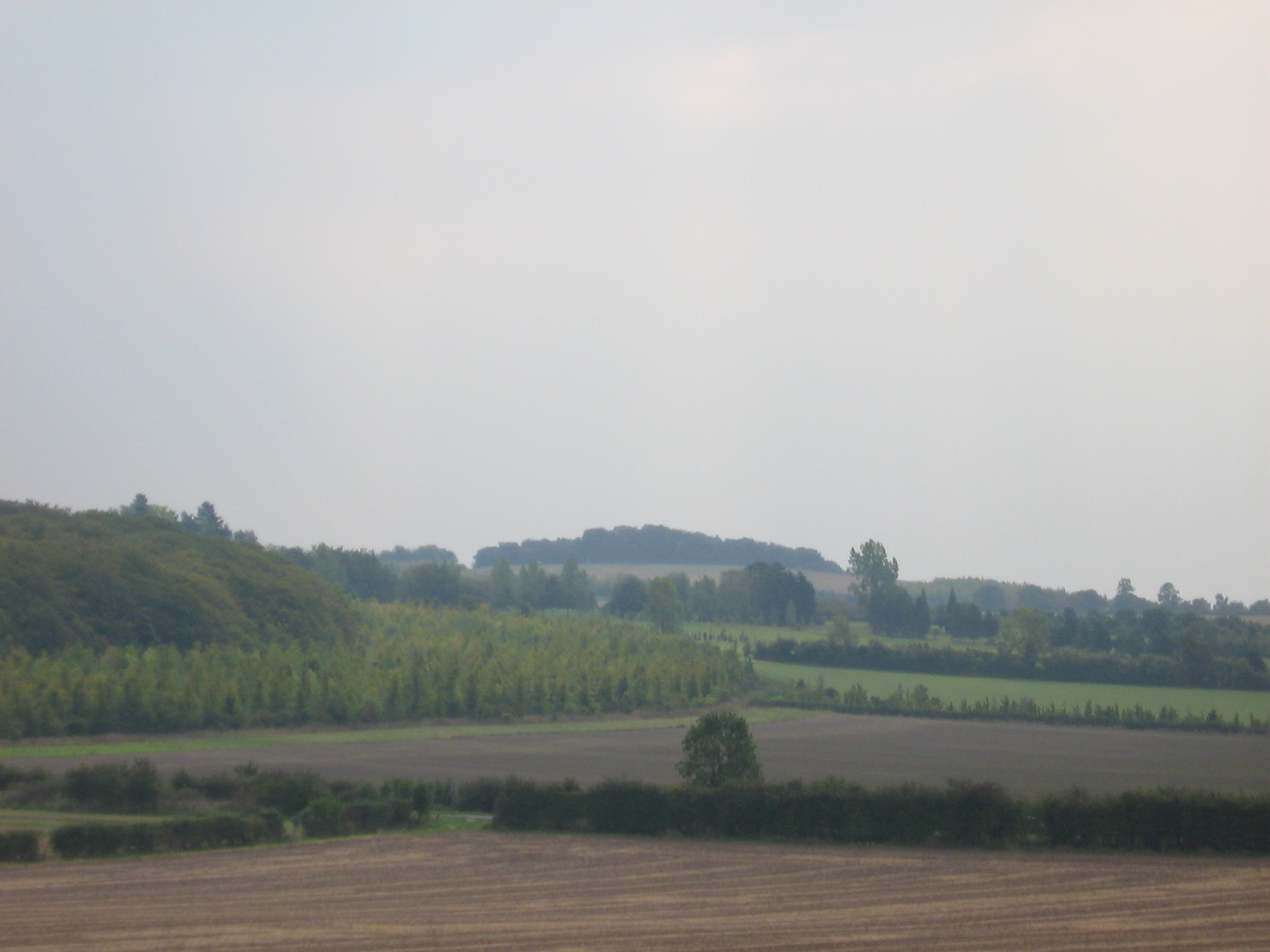
Gog Magog Hills

Where Troy Once Stood: The Mystery of Homer"s Iliad and Odyssey Revealed is a 1990 book by Iman Jacob Wilkens that argues that the city of Troy was located in England and that the Trojan War was fought between groups of Celts. The standard view is that Troy is located near the Dardanelles in Turkey. Wilkens claims that Homer's Iliad and Odyssey, though products of ancient Greek culture, are originally orally transmitted epic poems from Western Europe. Wilkens disagrees with conventional ideas about the historicity of the Iliad and the location and participants of the Trojan War.

His work has had little impact among professional scholars. Anthony Snodgrass, Emeritus Professor of Classical Archaeology at the University of Cambridge, has named Wilkens as an example of an "infinitely less-serious" writer.

The title of his book comes from the Roman poet Ovid: "Now there are fields where Troy once stood..." (Latin: Iam seges est, ubi Troia fuit…, Ovid, Heroides 1.1.53)

== Wilkens' arguments ==
Wilkens argues that Troy was located in England on the Gog Magog Hills in Cambridgeshire, and that the city of Ely refers to Ilium, another name for Troy. He believes that Celts living there were attacked around 1200 BC by fellow Celts from the European continent to battle over access to the tin mines in Cornwall as tin was a very important component for the production of bronze. In fact, Homer names the attackers of Troy as Achaeans, Argives and Danaans, not Greeks.

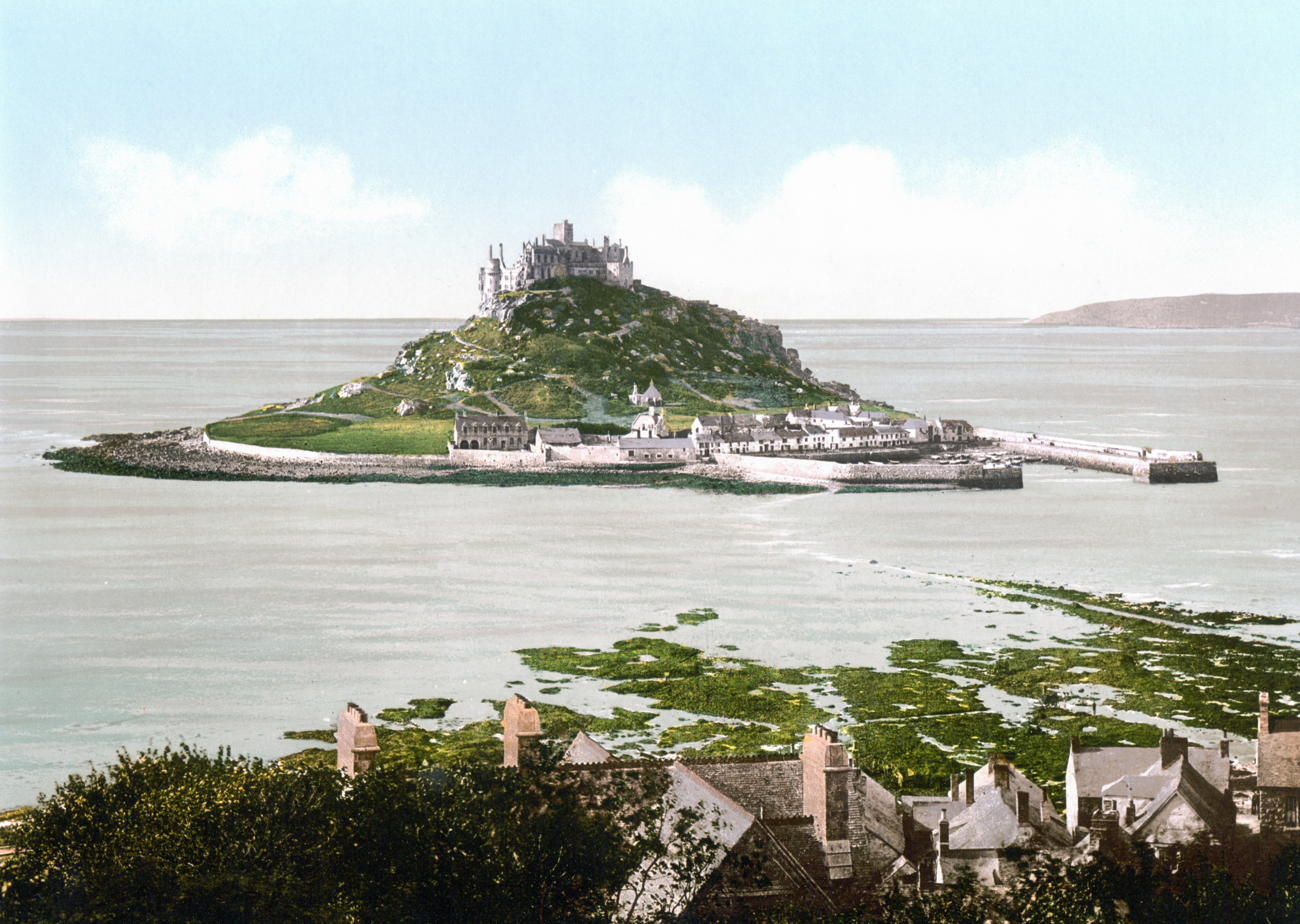
According to Wilkens, St Michael's Mount is the site of Scylla and Charybdis

Wilkens further hypothesises that the Sea Peoples found in the Late Bronze Age Mediterranean were Celts, who after the war settled in Greece and the Aegean Islands as the Achaeans and Pelasgians. They named new cities after the places they had come from and brought the oral poems that formed the basis of the Iliad and the Odyssey with them from western Europe. Wilkens writes that, after being orally transmitted for about four centuries, the poems were translated and written down in Greek around 750 BC. The Greeks, who had forgotten about the origins of the poems, located the stories in the Mediterranean, where many Homeric place names could be found, but the poems' descriptions of towns, islands, sailing directions and distances were not altered to fit the reality of the Greek setting. He also writes that "It also appears that Homer's Greek contains a large number of loan words from western European languages, more often from Dutch rather than English, French or German." These languages are considered by linguists to have not existed until at least 1000 years after Homer. Wilkens argues that the Atlantic Ocean was the theatre for the Odyssey instead of the Mediterranean. For example: he locates Scylla and Charybdis at present day St Michael's Mount.

=== Evidence ===
To support his hypothesis Wilkens uses archaeological evidence, for instance the Isleham Hoard in the battlefield, and etymological evidence, particularly place-names, for instance the location of Ismaros in Brittany at Ys or the location of Homer's Sidon at Medina Sidonia in Spain. He also argues that Homer described locations around the Atlantic, with distinctive topographical features. He also finds evidence that "snowy" Mount Olympus, home of the gods, was Mont Blanc, the highest peak in the Alps.

He also identifies similarities in the English names of 14 rivers in Cambridgeshire to those named in the Iliad, including the Cam (Scamander) and Thames (Temese) and adds a "reconstruction" of the Trojan battlefield in Cambridgeshire to his 2005 revised edition.

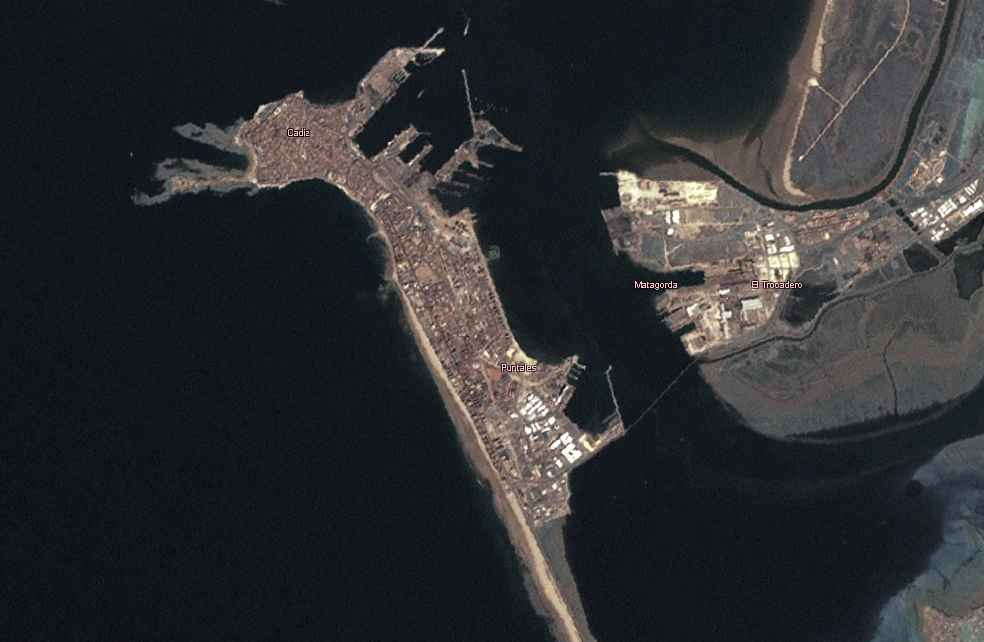
Cádiz: Ithaca?

Cádiz would match the description of Ithaca; "There is in the land of Ithaca a certain harbour of Phorcys, the old man of the sea, and at its mouth two projecting headlands sheer to seaward, but sloping down on the side toward the harbour..."

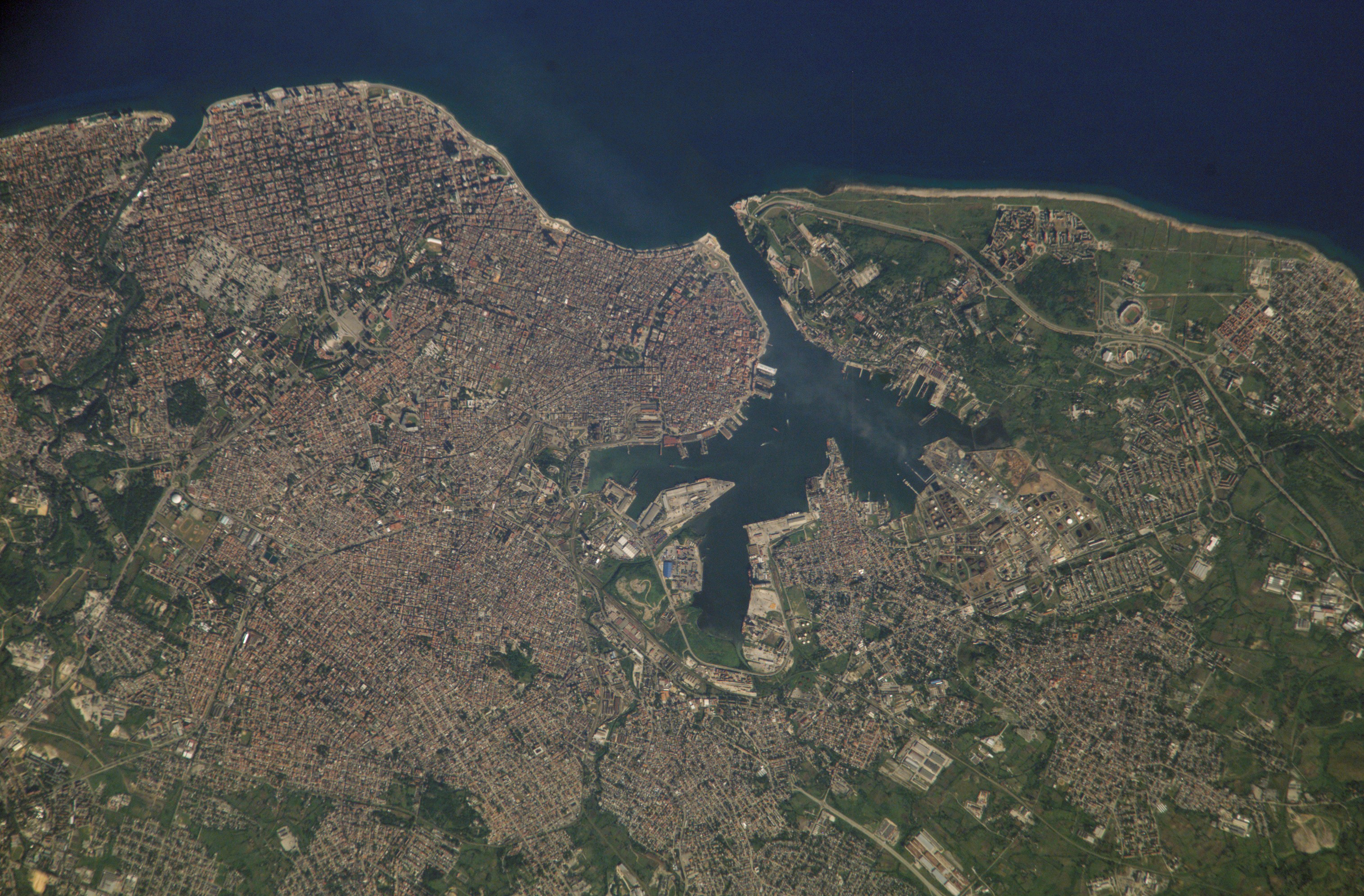
Havana: Telepylos?

Wilkens believes that Havana's topography greatly resembles the description of Telepylos: "The harbour, about which on both sides a sheer cliff runs continuously, and projecting headlands opposite to one another stretch out at the mouth, and the entrance is narrow, ..., and the ships were moored within the hollow harbour, for therein no wave ever swelled, great or small, but all about was a bright calm..."

=== Sources ===
Wilkens mentions several sources for his ideas. Belgian lawyer Théophile Cailleux wrote that Odysseus sailed the Atlantic Ocean, starting from Troy, which he situated near the Wash in England (1879). Karel Jozef de Graeve, member of the Flemish council, wrote that the historical and mythological background of Homer's work should be sought in Western Europe, around the Rhine–Meuse–Scheldt delta (posthumously, 1806).

== Reviews ==
As a work of fringe history, Where Troy Once Stood was largely ignored by academics. Isolated exceptions were a casual dismissal by A. M. Snodgrass and gentle mockery by Maurizio Bettini. Paul Millett, in a 2001 review of the Barrington Atlas of the Greek and Roman World, remarked that the geographers' decision to place Troy in northern Turkey rather than East Anglia was "presumably resolved without much difficulty".

Some reviewers noted the book's potential interest for popular audiences. M. F. MacKenzie wrote in Library Journal that the book "presents a compelling argument" and "makes for interesting reading", while also noting that it would not "be well received by serious classicists". In The Independent's "Building a library" series Tom Holland recommended the work for those who "have had enough of scepticism" about the Trojan War legend and have "wondered why Ilium sounds a bit like Ilford".

A review in Publishers Weekly noted that in Wilkens' "fanciful reading" of the texts, he "plays fast and loose with the evidence."

== Author ==
Iman Jacob Wilkens (born 13 March 1936, at Apeldoorn in the Netherlands, deceased 4 May 2018 (82 years old) in Roncq, Nord, Hauts-de-France, France) was educated in Economics at the University of Amsterdam. From 1966 he lived in France, where for more than thirty years he undertook research on Homer.

== Popular culture ==
Clive Cussler's 2003 Dirk Pitt novel Trojan Odyssey uses Wilkens' hypothesis as a backdrop.

== Publication history ==
- First published in Great Britain in 1990 by Rider / Century Hutchinson, London ISBN 0-7126-2463-5
- Paperback published in Great Britain in 1991 by Rider / Random Century, London ISBN 0-7126-5105-5
- Published in the United States in 1991 by St Martin's Press, New York ISBN 0-312-05994-9
- Book-club edition in Great Britain in 1992 by BCA, London ISBN 0-7126-4094-0
- Published in the Netherlands (in Dutch translation) in 1992 by Bigot & Van Rossum, Baarn ISBN 90-6134-381-X
- Published in the Netherlands (Revised edition in Dutch translation) in 1999 by Bosch & Keuning (Tirion), Baarn ISBN 90-246-0461-3
- Published in 2005/2009 (5th revised edition in English) by Gopherpublishers.com, Amsterdam,ISBN 978-90-5179-208-9
- Published in 2012 (revised edition in English) by Gopher.nl, Amsterdam, ISBN 978-90-5179-535-6
- Published in 2012 (third revised edition in Dutch translation) by Chaironeia.nl, Leeuwarden, ISBN 978-90-76792-20-0

== See also ==
- Bronze Age Britain
- Atlantic Bronze Age
- Geography of the Odyssey
- Mediterranean warfare and the Sea Peoples
- Troy Town
- Historicity of the Iliad
- Historia Regum Britanniae

== Bibliography ==
- Cailleux, Théophile (1879), Pays atlantiques décrits par Homère, Ibérie, Gaule, Bretagne, Archipels, Amériques, Théorie nouvelle, Paris: Maisonneuve et cie; OCLC: 23413881
- Gideon, Ernst (1973), Homerus Zanger der Kelten, Deventer: Ankh-Hermes, ISBN 90-202-2508-1
- de Graeve, Karel Jozef (1806), République des Champs élysées, ou, Monde ancien : ouvrage dans lequel on démontre principalement : que les Champs élysées et l'Enfer des anciens sont le nom d'une ancienne république d'hommes justes et religieux, située a l'extrémité septentrionale de la Gaule, et surtout dans les îles du Bas-Rhin : que cet Enfer a été le premier sanctuaire de l'initiation aux mỳsteres, et qu'Ulysse y a été initié ... : que les poètes Homère et Hésiode sont originaires de la Belgique, &c., Gent: De l'imprimerie de P.-F. de Goesin-Verhaeghe; OCLC: 53145878
