= Geography of the Odyssey =

Locations mentioned in Homer's Odyssey

Map of Homeric Greece based on the Catalogue of Ships in the Iliad (right-click on map to enlarge)

The locations mentioned in the narratives of Odysseus's adventures have long been debated. Events in the main sequence of the Odyssey take place in the Peloponnese and in what are now called the Ionian Islands (Ithaca and its neighbours). There are also incidental mentions of Troy and its house, Phoenicia, Egypt, and Crete, which hint at a geographical knowledge equal to, or perhaps slightly more extensive than that of the Iliad. The places visited by Odysseus in his journey have been variously identified with locations in Greece, Italy, Tunisia, the Maltese archipelago, and the Iberian peninsula. However, scholars both ancient and modern are divided whether any of the places visited by Odysseus (after Ismaros and before his return to Ithaca) were real. Many ancient writers came down squarely on the skeptical side; Strabo reported what the great geographer Eratosthenes had said in the late 3rd century BC: "You will find the scene of Odysseus' wanderings when you find the cobbler who sewed up the bag of winds."

== Geography of the Telemachy ==
The journey of Telemachus to Pylos and Sparta no longer raises geographical problems. The location of Nestor's Pylos was disputed in antiquity; towns named Pylos were found in Elis, Triphylia and Messenia, and each claimed to be Nestor's home. Strabo (8.3), citing earlier writers, argued that Homer meant Triphylian Pylos. Modern scholarship, however, generally locates Nestor's Pylos in Messenia. The presence of Mycenaean ruins at the archaeological site of Ano Englianos, or Palace of Nestor, have greatly strengthened this view. The Linear B tablets found at the site indicate that the site was called Pu-ro ("Pylos") by its inhabitants.

== Identification of Ithaca and neighboring islands ==
The geographical references in the Odyssey to Ithaca and its neighbors seem confused and have given rise to much scholarly argument, beginning in ancient times. Odysseus' Ithaca is usually identified with the island traditionally called Thiaki and now officially renamed Ithake, but some scholars have argued that Odysseus's Ithaca is actually Leucas, and others identify it with the whole or part of Cephalonia. Lately, Robert Bittlestone, in his book Odysseus Unbound, has identified the Paliki peninsula on Cephalonia with Homeric Ithaca.

== Geography of Odysseus's narrative ==
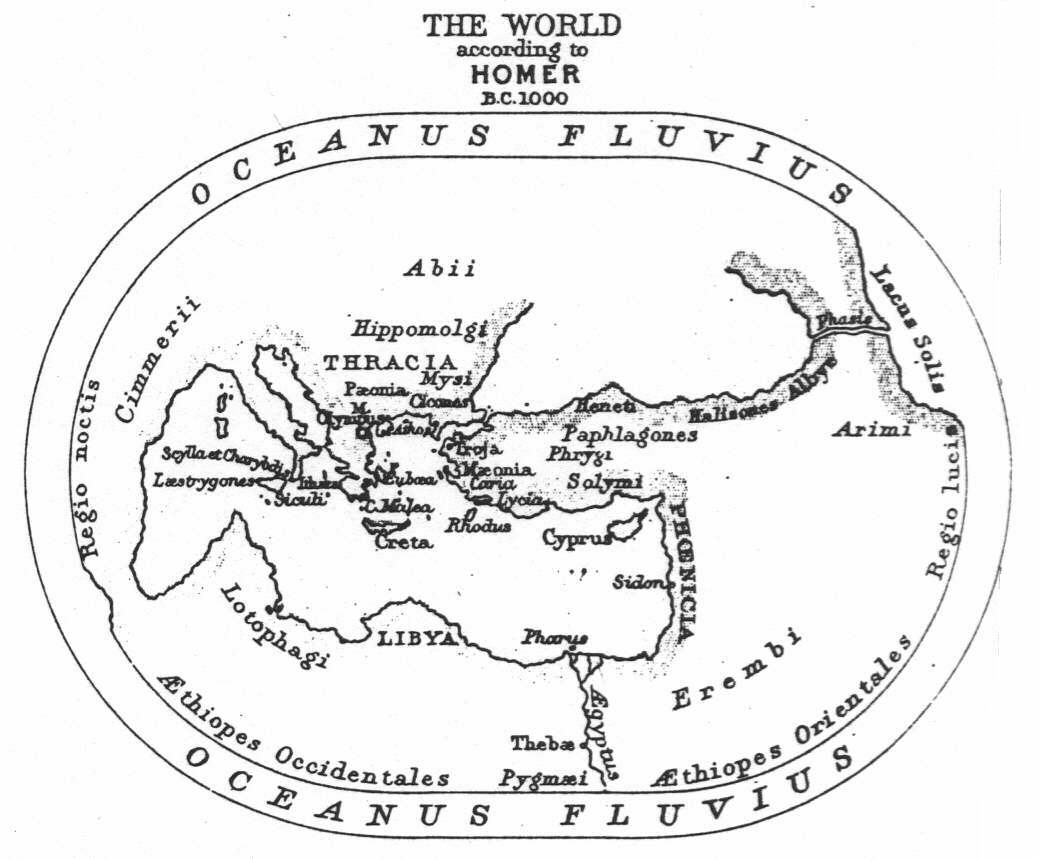
"The World according to Homer", according to an 1895 map

The geography of the Apologoi (the tale that Odysseus told to the Phaeacians, forming books 9–12 of the Odyssey), and the location of the Phaeacians' own island of Scheria, pose quite different problems from those encountered in identifying Troy, Mycenae, Pylos and Ithaca.

- The names of the places and peoples that Odysseus visits or claims to have visited are not recorded, either as historical or contemporary information, in any ancient source independent of the Odyssey.
- What happens to Odysseus in these places, according to his narrative, belongs to the realm of the supernatural or fantastic (to an extent that is not true of the remainder of the Odyssey).
- It can be doubted whether Odysseus' story is intended, within the general narrative of the Odyssey, to be taken as true.
- We cannot know whether the poet envisaged the places on Odysseus' itinerary, and the route from each place to the next, as real.
- Even if the places were envisaged as real, the effects of coastal erosion, silting and other geological changes over thousands of years can alter the landscape and seascape to the point where identification may be extremely difficult.

For these reasons, the opinions of later students and scholars about the geography of Odysseus's travels vary enormously. It has repeatedly been argued that each successive landfall, and the routes joining them, are real and can be mapped; it has been argued with equal conviction that they do not exist in the real world and never can be mapped.

=== Ancient identifications ===
Ancient sources provide a wealth of interpretations of Odysseus' wanderings, with a complex range of traditions which affect one another in various ways. Broadly speaking there are two dominant trends. One is that of Euhemerist accounts, which re-wrote mythical stories without their fantastic elements, and were often seen as thereby recovering "historical" records. The other reflects the conventions of foundation myths, whereby stories of a city or institution being founded in the course of Odysseus' travels often came to have political significance.

Some identifications are common to both groups. The main distinctions between them are in how the identifications were passed down through the generations, and the uses to which they were put. The most standard identifications, which are rarely disputed in ancient sources, are:

- land of the Cyclopes = Sicily
- land of the Laestrygonians = Sicily
- island of Aeolus = one or more of the Aeolian Islands off Sicily's north coast
- Scheria, the land of the Phaeacians = Corcyra (modern Corfu), off the west coast of Greece and Albania
- Ogygia, the island home of the nymph Calypso = Gaulos, modern Gozo, part of the Maltese archipelago.

==== Euhemerist accounts ====
Euhemerist accounts are generally those found in writers on antiquarian subjects, geographers, scholars, and historians. The most important ancient sources are the 1st century geographer Strabo, who is our source for information on Eratosthenes' and Polybius' investigations into the matter; and the novelisation of the Trojan War that goes under the name of Dictys of Crete, which many later writers treated as an authentic historical record of the war.

The prototypes for this tradition are in the 5th century BC. Herodotus identifies the land of the lotus-eaters as a headland in the territory of the Gindanes tribe in Libya, and Thucydides reports the standard identifications mentioned above. Herodotus and Thucydides do not actively euhemerise, but simply take local myths at face value for the political importance they had at the time.

Euhemerist accounts become more prominent in Alexandrian scholarship of the Hellenistic period. Callimachus identifies Scheria as Corcyra, and also identifies Calypso's island with Gaulos (modern Gozo, part of Malta). His student Apollonius of Rhodes also identifies Scheria as Corcyra in his epic the Argonautica.

Apollonius' successor as head of the library of Alexandria, Eratosthenes, wrote a detailed investigation into Odysseus' wanderings. Eratosthenes takes a cynical view, regarding Homer as an entertainer, not an educator: "You will find the scene of the wanderings of Odysseus when you find the cobbler who sewed up the bag of the winds." This does not mean that he refuses any and all identifications. He conjectures that Hesiod's information about the wanderings (see below on Hesiod) came from historical inquiries that Hesiod had made. The 2nd century BC poet-historian Apollodorus of Athens sympathises with Eratosthenes, believing that Homer imagined the wanderings as having taken place in a kind of fairyland in the Atlantic; he actively criticises the standard identifications in and around Sicily, and refuses to offer any identifications of his own.

The 2nd century BC historian Polybius discusses the wanderings in book 34 of his history. He refutes Apollodorus' idea that the wanderings were in the Atlantic on the basis of Odyssey 9.82, where Odysseus says that he sailed for nine days from Cape Malea in the Peloponnese to the land of the lotus-eaters: it would take much longer than nine days to reach the Atlantic. He accepts the standard identifications around Sicily, and is the earliest source to identify Scylla and Charybdis explicitly with the Strait of Messina. He also identifies the land of the lotus-eaters as the island of Djerba (ancient Meninx), off the coast of Tunisia. Polybius is the most euhemerist source to this date: he justifies the description of Aeolus in the Odyssey as "king of the winds" on the grounds that Aeolus "taught navigators how to steer a course in the regions of the Strait of Messina, whose waters are ... difficult to navigate", and insists that the mythical elements in the wanderings are insignificant in comparison to the historical core.

Strabo, living in the late 1st century BC and early 1st century AD, says that he tries to strike a balance between reading Homer as an entertainer and as a historical source. He is Euhemerist to the extent that he believes that any hypothesis at all, no matter how outrageous, is more plausible than saying "I don't know"; in this regard he accepts Polybius' arguments completely. Strabo offers the most detailed surviving set of identifications:

- Lotus-eaters: Djerba, following Polybius (1.2.17)
- Cyclops: south-east Sicily, near Etna and Lentini (1.2.9); also suggests that Homer "borrowed his idea of the one-eyed Cyclopes from the history of Scythia, for it is reported that the Arimaspians are a one-eyed people" (1.2.10)
- Aeolus: Lipari, among the Aeolian Islands north of Sicily
- Laestrygonians: south-east Sicily (1.2.9)
- land of the Cimmerians: the Bosporus (1.2.9)
- the Ocean: the Black Sea (ancient Pontus; 1.2.10)
- Sirens: either Cape Faro, by the Strait of Messina; or Sirenussae, a headland in Italy between the Bay of Naples and the Gulf of Salerno; or Naples itself (1.2.12–13)
- Scylla and Charybdis: Strait of Messina (1.2.9, 1.2.16)
- Ogygia (Calypso's island) and Scheria: "imagined in fantasy" as being in the Atlantic (1.2.18)

Plutarch agrees with Strabo on the location of Calypso's island of Ogygia in the Atlantic, and specifically west of Britain. He also repeats what Plato had described as a continent on the opposite side of the Atlantic (North America?), and he adds that from this continent Ogygia was about 900 kilometres / 558 miles distant. Plutarch's account of Ogygia has created a lot of controversy as to whether he was referring to a real or a mythical place. Kepler in his “Kepleri Astronomi Opera Omnia” estimated that “the great continent” was America and attempted to locate Ogygia and the surrounding islands. G. Mair in 1909 proposed that the knowledge of America came from Carthaginian sailors who had reached the Gulf of Mexico. Hamilton in 1934 indicated the similarities of Plutarch's account and Plato's location of Atlantis on the Timaeus, 24E - 25A.

Other sources offer miscellaneous details. The Library wrongly attributed to Apollodorus summarises most of the accounts given above. Aristonicus, a contemporary of Strabo's, wrote a monograph On the wanderings of Menelaus, which influenced Strabo's own discussion.

Finally, the Ephemeris attributed to Dictys of Crete, who claims to have been present at the Trojan War, was probably written in the 1st century CE or perhaps a little earlier. It falls into a tradition of anti-Homeric literature, based on the supposition that Homer got most things about the Trojan War wrong by making virtuous people look like villains, and vice versa. It is important because later historians took Dictys as a historical record, including Sisyphus of Cos, John Malalas, George Cedrenus, John of Antioch, and others. Many Western mediaeval writers also accepted Dictys (in the Latin summary by Lucius Septimius) as the definitive account of the Trojan War.

According to Dictys, Odysseus fled from Troy after being accused of murdering Aias. He first went north to the Black Sea for a while; he sacked the Ciconian town of Ismarus in Thrace on his way back. After visiting the lotus-eaters he went to Sicily, where he encountered three (or four) brothers, Antiphates, Cyclops, and Polyphemus (and possibly Laestrygon, according to Septimius), who each ruled a portion of the island. Odysseus and his men were mistreated by each of these kings in turn. Notably, they were imprisoned by Polyphemus when one of Odysseus' men fell in love with Polyphemus' daughter (Arene or Elpe) and tried to kidnap her; but they escaped. They passed through the Aeolian Islands, but the surviving accounts of Dictys do not give specific locations for the rest of the wanderings. Malalas' account of Dictys, however, tells us that Circe and Calypso were sisters ruling over neighbouring islands; that Odysseus visited a lake called Nekyopompos ("guide of the dead") near the sea, whose inhabitants were seers; that he passed some rocks called the Seirenidai; and Cedrenus' account seems to identify Scheria with Corfu, or at least an island near Ithaca.

==== Foundation myths ====
Numerous places in Italy and northern Greece also had aetiological legends about cities and other institutions founded by Odysseus on his various travels. Among these foundation myths the continuation of Odysseus's travels told in the Telegony is at least as important as the wanderings reported in the Odyssey.

The earliest record of a foundation myth connecting Odysseus with Italy is the lines surviving in Hesiod's Theogony (1011ff.), which report that Odysseus and Circe had two sons Agrius and Latinus, who ruled over the Etruscans (Tyrsenoi). Latinus is an important figure in many early Italian myths. The lines are not in fact Hesiodic, but they are probably no later than the 6th century BC.

E.D. Phillips gives a very full treatment of myths that placed Odysseus and Telegonus, his son by Circe, in Italy.

=== Modern views ===
==== Imaginary places ====
The modern Greek Homerist Ioannis Kakridis may be compared with Eratosthenes in his approach to the problem. He argued that the Odyssey is a work of poetry and not a travel log. To attempt a quick outline of Kakridis's views, it is useless to try to locate the places mentioned in Odysseus' narrative on the map; we cannot confuse the narrative of Odyssey with history unless we believe in the existence of gods, giants and monsters. Kakridis admits that one may indeed ask what real locations inspired these imaginary places, but one must always bear in mind that geography is not the main concern either of Odysseus (as narrator) or of the poet. Similarly, Merry and Riddell, in their late-19th century school edition of the Odyssey, state the following opinion: "Throughout these books [books 9–12] we are in a wonderland, which we shall look in vain for on the map". W. B. Stanford, in his mid-20th century edition, comments as follows on book 9 lines 80–81 (where Odysseus says that he met storms off Cape Malea near the island of Cythera): "These are the last clearly identifiable places in O.'s wanderings. After this he leaves the sphere of Geography and enters Wonderland ..." Thereafter, while frequently referring to ancient opinions on the location of Odysseus's adventures, Stanford makes little or no reference to modern theories.

Robin Lane Fox observes of Euboean Greek settlements in Sicily and Italy, "During their first phase in the West, c. 800–740, stories of mythical heroes were not already sited at points along the coast of Italy or Sicily. It was only later that such stories became located there, as if mythical heroes had been driven westward or fled from Asia while leaving the sack of Troy." The heroic legends, including an Odyssean geography, served to attach newly founded western communities "to a prestigious ancestry in the Greeks' mythical past." Fox notes that even Circe found a home on "Monte Circeo" between Rome and Cumae: "but this association began at the earliest in the later sixth century BC. The Etruscan king Tarquin the Proud (c. 530–510) was credited with the settlement and in due course the very 'cup' of Odysseus was shown at the site."

==== The western Mediterranean ====
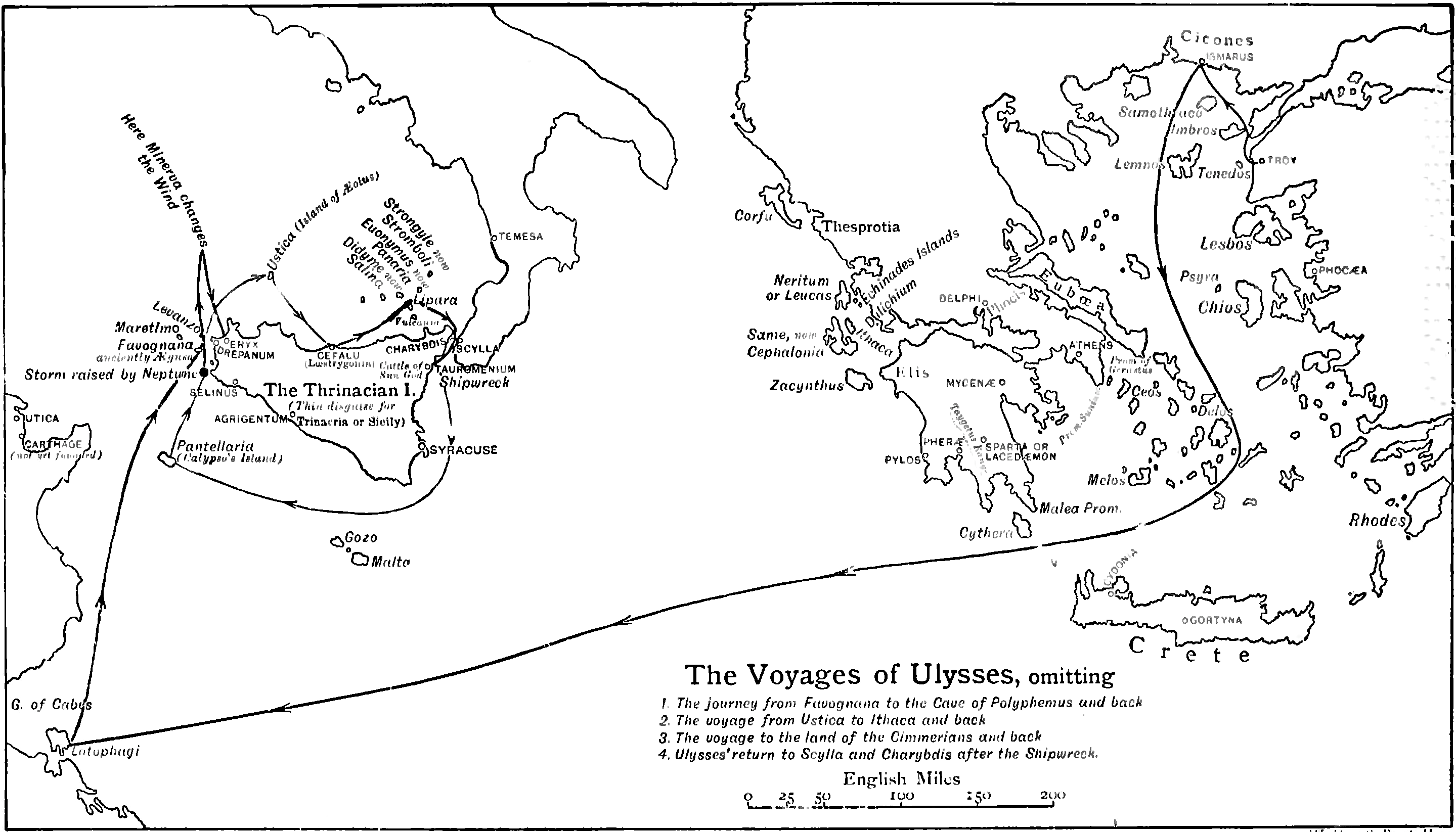
Map of Ulysses' travels from Butler's English translation of The Odyssey (1900)

By contrast with these views, some recent scholars, travelers and armchair travelers have tried to map Odysseus's travels. Modern opinions are so varied in detail that for convenience they need to be classified, as do the ancient ones. This article deals first with those who believe, as did many ancient authors, that the hero of the Odyssey was driven west or south-west from Cape Malea and, more than nine years later, returned from the west to his native Ionian islands: his landfalls are therefore to be found in the western Mediterranean.

For a long time the most detailed study of Odysseus's travels was that of the French Homeric scholar Victor Bérard. Although adopting the general frame of reference of the ancient commentators, Bérard differed from them in some details. For Bérard the land of the Lotus-Eaters was Djerba off southern Tunisia; the land of the Cyclopes was at Posillipo in Italy; the island of Aeolus was Stromboli; the Laestrygonians were in northern Sardinia; Circe's home was Monte Circeo in Lazio; the entrance to the Underworld was near Cumae, just where Aeneas found it in the Aeneid; the Sirens were on the coast of Lucania; Scylla and Charybdis were at the Strait of Messina; the Island of the Sun was Sicily; the homeland of Calypso was at the Straits of Gibraltar. From there Odysseus's route took him to Scheria, which Bérard, like so many of his ancient predecessors, identified with Corcyra.

Bérard's views were taken as standard in the 1959 Atlas of the Classical World by A. A. M. van der Heyden and H. H. Scullard. They were adopted in whole or in part by several later writers. Michel Gall, for example, followed Bérard throughout except that he placed the Laestrygonians in southern Corsica. Ernle Bradford had meanwhile added some new suggestions: the land of the Cyclopes was around Marsala in western Sicily; the island of Aeolus was Ustica off Sicily; Calypso was on Malta. The Obregons, in Odysseus Airborne, follow Bradford in some identifications but add several of their own. The Lotus Eaters are in the Gulf of Sidra; the Cyclops and Aeolus are both to be found in the Balearic Isles; the island of Circe is Ischia in the Bay of Naples; most unexpectedly, Scheria is Cyprus.

Translator Samuel Butler developed a controversial theory that the Odyssey came from the pen of a young Sicilian woman, who presents herself in the poem as Nausicaa, and that the scenes of the poem reflected the coast of Sicily, especially the territory of Trapani and its nearby islands. He described the "evidence" for this theory in his The Authoress of the Odyssey (1897) and in the introduction and footnotes to his prose translation of the Odyssey (1900). Robert Graves elaborated on this hypothesis in his novel Homer's Daughter.

==== Around Greece ====
A minority view is that the landfalls of Odysseus were inspired by places on a much shorter itinerary along the coast of Greece itself. One of the earliest to suggest any locations here was the 2nd century AD geographer Pausanias who, in his Description of Greece, suggested that the nekyia took place at the river Acheron in north west Greece, where the Necromanteion was subsequently built. However the location was overlooked or dismissed by many subsequently, until the archaeologist Sotirios Dakaris excavated the site, beginning in 1958. He found evidence of sacrifices to the dead that matched Homer's description of those made by Odysseus. Subsequently, the location was accepted by others as that described by Homer.

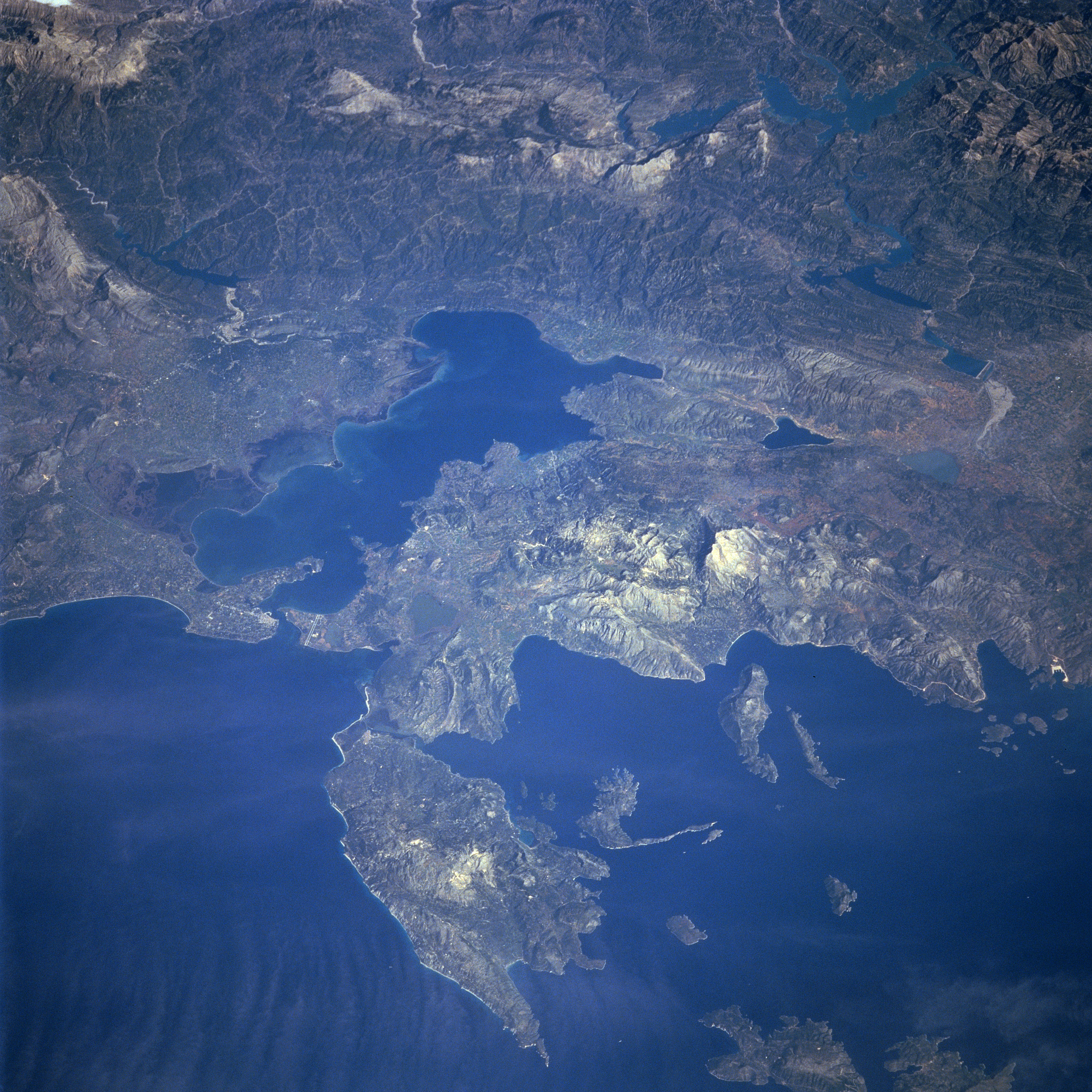
The Ambracian Gulf and the island of Levkas (foreground, centre), around which Severin suggested locations for the Sirens, the Wandering Rocks, Scylla, Charybdis and the island of Helios's cattle

Working on the assumption that the discoveries at the Acheron could challenge the traditional assumptions about the Odyssey's geography, Tim Severin sailed a replica Greek sailing vessel (originally built for his attempt to retrace the steps of Jason and the Argonauts) along the "natural" route from Troy to Ithaca, following the sailing directions that could be teased out of the Odyssey. Along the way he found locations at the natural turning and dislocation points which, he claimed, agreed with the text much more closely than the usual identifications. However, he also came to the conclusion that the sequence of adventures from Circe onwards derived from a separate itinerary to the sequence that ended with the Laestrygonians and was possibly derived from the stories of the Argonauts. He placed many of the later episodes on the north west Greek coast, near the Acheron. Along the way he found on the map Cape Skilla (at the entrance to the Ambracian Gulf) and other names that implied traditional links with the Odyssey. Severin agrees with the common opinion that the Lotus Eaters are in North Africa (although he placed them in modern Libya rather than Tunisia) and that Scheria is Corcyra.

A key part of Severin's thesis is that whilst the text of the Odyssey contains many place names to the east and south of Greece, there are very few identifiable references to places to the west. As a result, he questions whether the western Mediterranean was known about at the time the original legends emerged (which he estimated to be some centuries before Homer composed the poem) and so consequently he doubted whether the stories had their origins there. In addition he noted that the Acheron is marked on the map, but traditionally ignored, whilst in the Argonautica of Apollonius of Rhodes the Argonauts' home voyage took them into the Adriatic and Ionian Seas, corresponding to a north west Greek location for many of the later adventures.

==== Atlantic Ocean and other theories ====
Strabo's opinion (mentioned above) that Calypso's island and Scheria were imagined by the poet as being "in the Atlantic Ocean" has had significant influence on modern theorists. Henriette Mertz, a 20th-century author, argued that Circe's island is Madeira, Calypso's island one of the Azores, and the intervening travels record a discovery of North America: Scylla and Charybdis are in the Bay of Fundy, Scheria in the Caribbean.

Enrico Mattievich proposed that Odysseus's journey to the Underworld takes place in South America. The river Acheron is the Amazon; after a long voyage upstream Odysseus meets the spirits of the dead at the confluence of the rio Santiago and rio Marañon. Two centuries ago, Charles-Joseph de Grave argued that the Underworld visited by Odysseus was the islands at the mouth of the river Rhine. A more extreme view, that the whole geography of the Iliad and the Odyssey can be mapped on the coasts of the northern Atlantic, occasionally surfaces. According to this, Troy is in southern England, Telemachus's journey is in southern Spain, and Odysseus was wandering the Atlantic coast. Finally, a recent publication argues that Homeric geography is to be found in the sky, and that the Iliad and the Odyssey can be decoded as a star map.

== See also ==
- Homeric scholarship

== Notes ==
=== Bibliography ===
- Ballabriga, Alain (1998), Les fictions d'Homere. L'invention mythologique et cosmographique dans l'Odyssee, Paris: PUF
- Bérard, Victor (1933), Dans le sillage d'Ulysse, Paris
- Bérard, Victor (1927–1929), Les Navigations d'Ulysse, Paris
- Bérard, Victor (1927), Les Phéniciens et l'Odyssée, Paris
- Bradford, Ernle (1963), Ulysses Found
- Cailleux, Théophile (1879), Pays atlantiques décrits par Homère: Ibérie, Gaule, Bretagne, Archipels, Amériques; théorie nouvelle, Paris: Maisonneuve
- de Grave, Charles-Joseph (1806), République des Champs élysées, ou, Monde ancien: ouvrage dans lequel on démontre principalement que les Champs Élysées et l'Enfer des anciens sont le nom d'une ancienne république d'hommes justes et religieux, située a l'extrémité septentrionale de la Gaule, et surtout dans les îles du Bas-Rhin; que cet Enfer a été le premier sanctuaire de l'initiation aux mỳsteres, et qu'Ulysse y a été initié ...; que les poètes Homère et Hésiode sont originaires de la Belgique, &c., Ghent
- Hennig, R. (1934), Die Geographie des homerischen Epos, Leipzig
- Heubeck, A., ed. (1981–1986), Omero, Odissea, Rome (English version: A. Heubeck, S. West and others, A commentary on Homer's Odyssey. Oxford, 1988-92. 3 vols.)
- Johnson, Laurin R. (1999), Shining in the Ancient Sea: The Astronomical Ancestry of Homer's Odyssey, Portland, OR: Multnomah House, ISBN 0-9669828-0-0
- Lessing, E. (1970), The Adventures of Odysseus (contribution by Michel Gall)
- Malkin, Irad (1998), The Returns of Odysseus, Berkeley: University of California Press
- Mattievich, Enrico (1992), Viagem ao inferno mitológico
- Mertz, Henriette (1964), Wine Dark Sea
- Obregon, E. (1971), Ulysses Airborne
- Romm, James (1994), The Edges of the Earth in Ancient Thought, Princeton: Princeton University Press
- Roth, Hal (2000), We Followed Odysseus
- Severin, Tim (1987), The Ulysses Voyage: Sea Search for the Odyssey
- Simpson, R. Hope; Lazenby, J. F. (1970), The Catalogue of Ships in Homer's Iliad, Oxford: Oxford University Press
- Stanford, W. B. (1947), The Odyssey of Homer, London: Macmillan
- Stanford, W. B.; Luce, J. V. (1974), The Quest for Odysseus, New York: Praeger
- Voss, Johann Heinrich (1804), Alte Weltkunde, Jena, Stuttgart
- Wilkens, Iman (1990), Where Troy Once Stood, London: Rider
- Wolf, A.; Wolf, H.-H. (1983), Die wirkliche Reise des Odysseus [The Real Journey of Odysseus], München: Langenmüller
