= Théophile Cailleux =

Belgian lawyer and author (1816-1890)

Théophile Cailleux (1816–1890) was a Belgian lawyer, born in Calais in France and the author of a work on Homeric geography published in 1879. The title is Pays atlantiques décrits par Homère: Ibérie, Gaule, Bretagne, Archipels, Amériques: Théorie nouvelle ("Atlantic lands described by Homer: the Iberian peninsula, Gaul, Britain, the Atlantic islands, the Americas. A new theory"). As the title suggests, Cailleux took the unusual view that the geographical background to the events described in the Iliad and Odyssey was the coasts of the Atlantic Ocean, and not the shores of the Aegean Sea and Mediterranean Sea. The book was published in Paris by Maisonneuve.

== Theoretical work ==
Cailleux wrote that Troy was situated in East Anglia where he had discovered two huge war-dykes between Cambridge and the Wash. Here, he identified the river Cam with the Iliad's Scamander and the river Great Ouse with Homer's Simoïs. He was convinced that Homeric Troy was once situated on the heights outside Cambridge known as the Gog Magog Hills. Ithaca, he believed, should be sought in south-west Spain, in the delta of the Guadalete, somewhere between Jerez de la Frontera and Cádiz. He found the spring Arethusa: the present Fuente Amarga near Chiclana de la Frontera, well known for its therapeutic waters, and identified Ithaca's Mount Neriton with the Nertobriga (briga meaning mountain in Celtic), a height figuring on a map of southern Celtiberia by the 2nd century Greek geographer Ptolemaeus.

Cailleux's work followed fairly soon after Heinrich Schliemann's triumphant demonstration that Troy and Mycenae existed as powerful cities at the right time and in the right place to have fought a Trojan War such as the epics describe (see for example Schliemann's Ithaka, der Peloponnesus und Troja, 1868). The need for geographical speculation had thus been to some extent removed, and Cailleux was not taken seriously by Homeric scholars or archaeologists.

== Bibliography ==
- Origine celtique de la civilisation de tous les peuples: théorie nouvelle. Brussels: Weissenbruch; Paris: Maisonneuve, 1878.
- Pays atlantiques décrits par Homère: Ibérie, Gaule, Bretagne, Archipels, Amérique: théorie nouvelle. Paris: Maisonneuve, 1879.
- Poésies d'Homère faites en Ibérie et décrivant non la Méditerranée, mais l'Atlantique. Paris: Maisonneuve, 1879.
- Belges et Bataves, leur origine, leur haute importance dans la civilisation primitive, d'après les théories nouvelles. Brussels: Weissenbruch, 1881.
- Théorie nouvelle sur les origines humaines: Homère en Occident, Troie en Angleterre. Brussels: Weissenbruch, 1883.
- Troie en Angleterre, Ménélas à Paris: résumé de huit conférences faites à Paris. Paris: A. Ghio, 1885.
- La Judée en Europe: la vérité sur les Juifs, leur origine et leur religion. Paris: Chamuel, 1894.

== See also ==
- Geography of the Odyssey
- Where Troy Once Stood
