= Laestrygonians =

Tribe of giants in the Odyssey

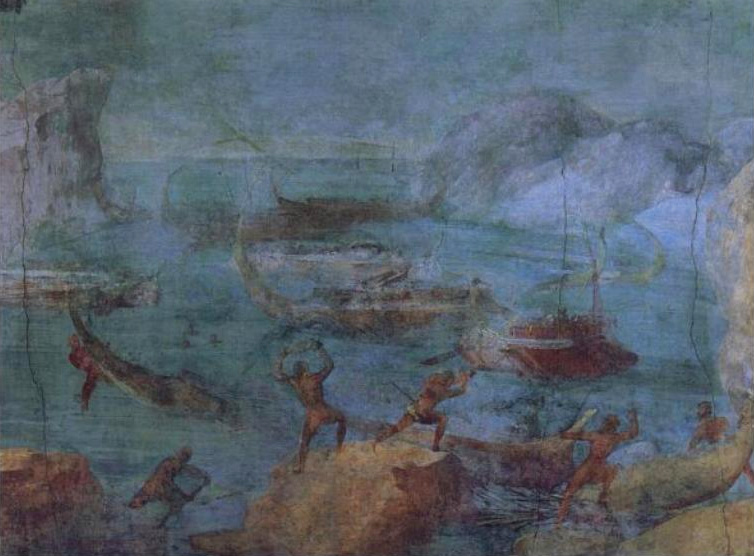
The fourth panel of the so-called "Odyssey Landscapes" wall painting from the Vatican Museums in Rome, 60–40 BC

In Greek mythology, the Laestrygonians /ˌlɛstrɪˈɡoʊniənz/ or Laestrygones /lɛˈstrɪɡəˌniːz/ (Greek: Λαιστρυγόνες) were a tribe of man-eating giants. They were said to have sprung from Laestrygon, son of Poseidon.

Thucydides (6.2.1) names the Laestrygones, together with the Cyclopes, as the oldest inhabitants said to have lived in a part of Sicily, but says he cannot tell who they were or where they came from; Pliny the Elder in the Natural History (7.2) places them "in the very centre of the earth, in Italy and Sicily". The name is akin to that of the Lestriconi, a branch of the Corsi people of the northeast coast of Sardinia (now Gallura).

== Mythology ==
Odysseus, the main character of Homer's Odyssey, visited them during his journey back home to Ithaca. "His soldiers, with a dozen ships, arrive at 'the rocky stronghold of Lamos: Telepylus, the city of the Laestrygonians'." The giants ate many of Odysseus's men and destroyed eleven of his twelve ships by launching rocks from high cliffs. Odysseus's ship was not destroyed because it was hidden in a cove near shore. Everyone on Odysseus's ship survived the incident.

Lamos is not mentioned again, perhaps being understood as the founder of the city or the name of the island on which the city is situated. In this land, a man who could do without sleep could earn double wages; once as a herdsman of cattle and another as a shepherd, as they worked by night as they did by day. The ships entered a harbor surrounded by steep cliffs, with a single entrance between two headlands. The captains took their ships inside and made them fast close to one another, where it was dead calm.

Odysseus kept his own ship outside the harbor, moored to a rock. He climbed a high rock to reconnoiter, but could see nothing but some smoke rising from the ground. He sent two of his company and an attendant to investigate the inhabitants. The men followed a road and eventually met a young woman on her way to the Fountain of Artakia to fetch some water, who said she was a daughter of Antiphates or Antiphatus, the king, and directed them to his house. However, when they got there they found a gigantic woman, the wife of Antiphates, who promptly called her husband, who immediately left the assembly of the people and upon arrival snatched up one of the men, killing and eating him on the spot. The other two men ran away, but Antiphates raised an outcry, so that they were pursued by thousands of Laestrygonians, who are either giants or very large men and women. They threw vast rocks from the cliffs, smashing the ships, and speared the men like fish. Odysseus made his escape with his single ship because it was not trapped in the harbor; the rest of his company was lost. The surviving crew went next to Aeaea, the island of Circe.

According to one tradition, the Laestrygonians suffered a devastating defeat at the hands of Heracles during his return with the cattle of Geryon. When they engaged him in battle, Heracles slew the majority of them, leaving only a small remnant of survivors. Some ancient authorities further maintain that the inhabitants of Leontini in Sicily subsequently settled the territory identified by Homer as Laestrygonia.

According to historian Angelo Paratico, the Laestrygonians were the result of a legend originated by the sighting by Greek sailors of the Giants of Mont'e Prama, recently excavated in Sardinia.

Later Greeks believed that the Laestrygonians, as well as the Cyclopes, had once inhabited Sicily.

== Gallery ==
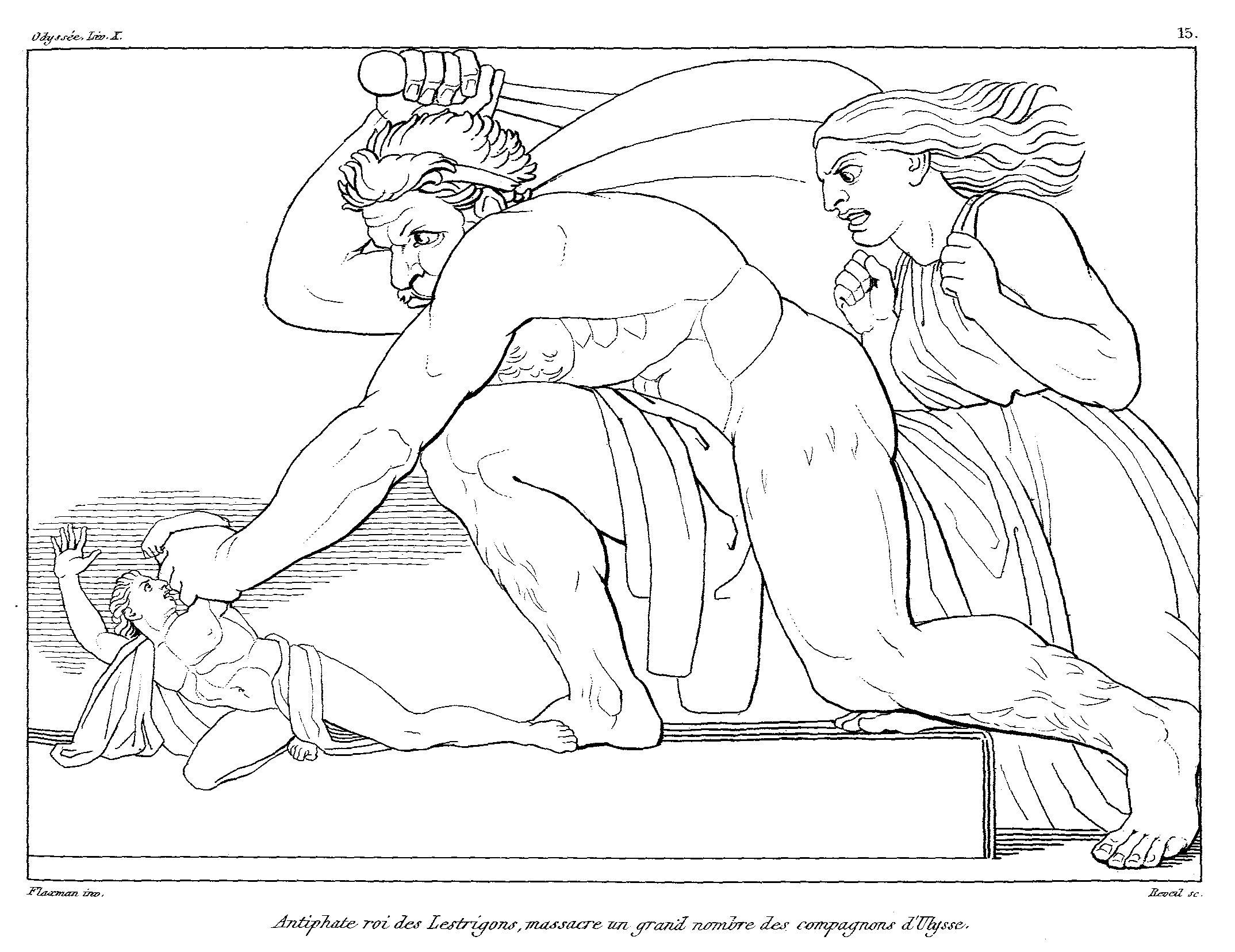
Illustration by John Flaxman for the Odyssey, 1810

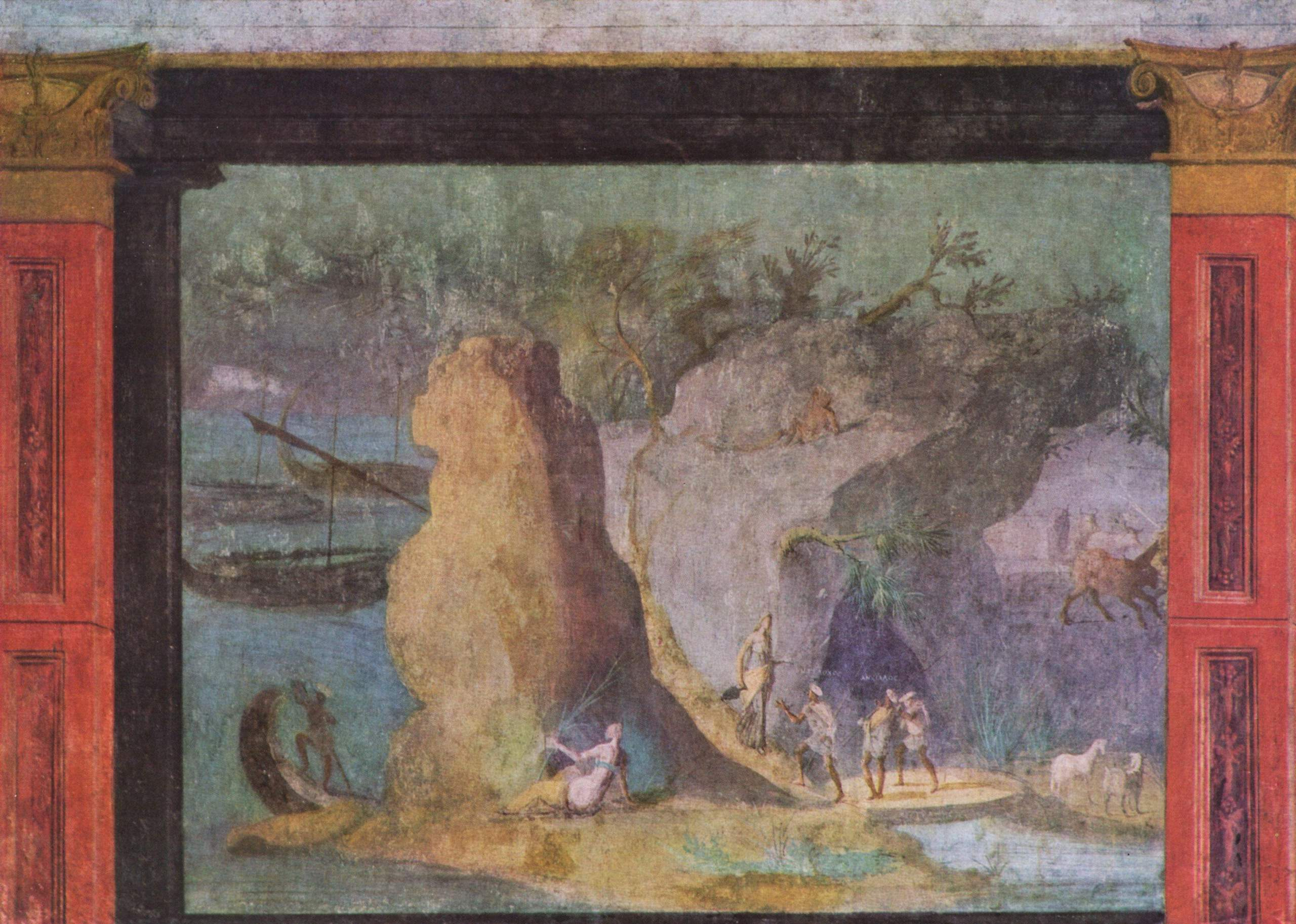
Fresco from Rome, c. 125 BC, from the "House of via Graziosa"

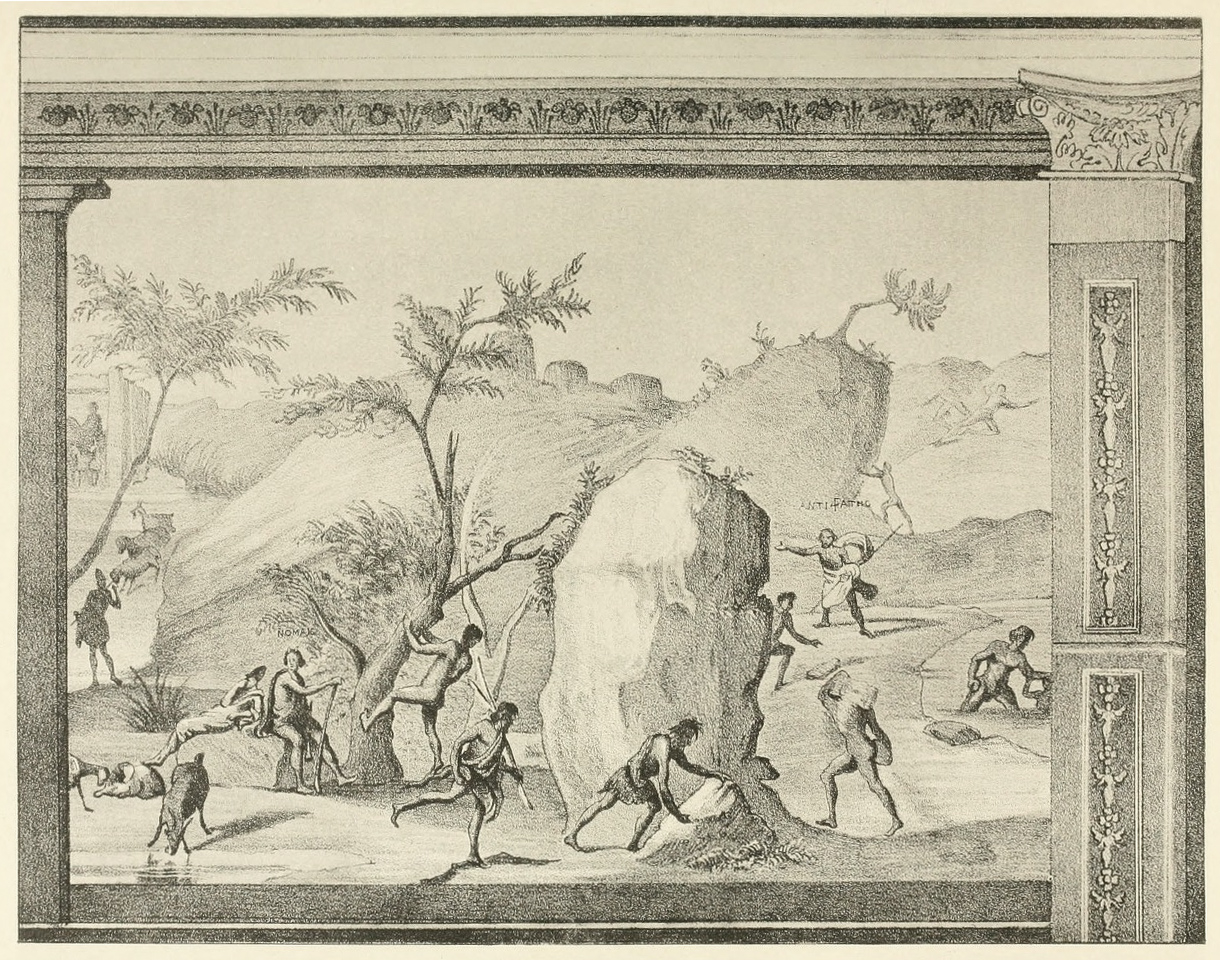
Adventures of Laestrygones, fresco from the Esquiline Hill, Rome
