= Homer's Ithaca =

Island home of Greek mythological hero Odysseus

A reconstruction of Homeric Greece. Modern Ithaca is located in the Adriatic Sea (in turquoise).

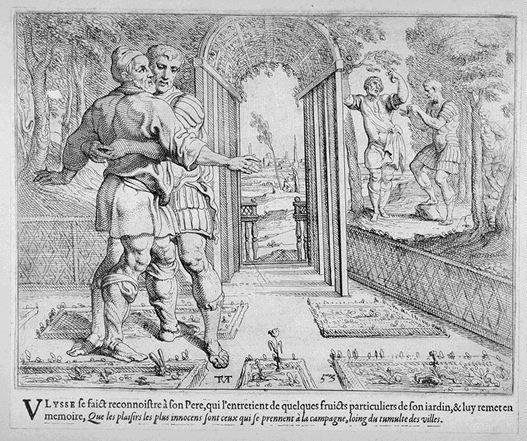
Odysseus meets his father Laertes on Ithaca (Theodoor van Thulden, 1600)

In Greek mythology, Ithaca (/ˈɪθəkə/; Ancient Greek: ᾽Ιθάκη, Ithákē) was the island home of the hero Odysseus. The specific location of the island, as it was described in Homer's Odyssey, is a matter for debate. Modern Ithaca has traditionally been accepted to be Homer's island, but alternative locations have been theorized.

The central characters of the epic, such as Odysseus, Achilles, Agamemnon and Hector, are traditionally considered fictional figures from folklore, but aspects of the Homeric story may have some basis in actual historical events or people. This, and the extremely detailed geographic descriptions in the epic itself, have invited investigation of the possibility that Homer's heroes might have existed and that the location of the sites described therein might be found.

Heinrich Schliemann believed he tracked down several of the more famous traditions surrounding these heroes. Many locations around the Mediterranean were claimed to have been the heroes' homes, such as the ruins at Mycenae and the little hill near the western Turkish town of Hissarlik. Schliemann's work and excavations proposed, to a very skeptical world, that Homer's Agamemnon had lived at Mycenae, and that "Troy" itself indeed had existed at Hisarlik. Much work has been done to identify other Homeric sites such as the palace of Nestor at Pylos. These attempts have been the subject of much scholarly research, archaeological work, and controversy.

Some of the first theories on the location of Homer's Ithaca were formulated as early as the 2nd century BC. Each approach to identifying a location has been different, varying in degrees of scientific procedure, empirical investigation, informed hypothesis, wishful thinking, fervent belief, and sheer fantasy. Each investigator and each investigation merits interest, as an indicator both of the temper of the times in which a particular theory was developed, and of the perennial interest in Odysseus and the possible facts of his life. Some of the latest approaches to locating Homer's Ithaca resemble some of the earliest.

== Proposed locations ==
Theorists, and excavations elsewhere, on the location of Homer's Ithaca:

- Eratosthenes (276 BC – 194 BC), as recorded by Strabo, believed that there was no Ithaca—i.e., that it was entirely an imaginary invention of Homer's.
- Demetrius of Scepsis—writing (near Troy) in the mid-2nd century BC—was the author of an extensive work upon Homeric and Troadic geography, which source was used by Strabo (see below); too little survives thereof, unfortunately, to determine where Demetrius may have preferred to situate Ithaca.
  - Pfeiffer, R. (1968). History of Classical Scholarship: From the Beginnings to the End of the Hellenistic Age. Oxford: Oxford University Press. pp. 249–51. See Bittlestone/Diggle/Underhill (below): James Diggle at p. 508.
- Apollodorus of Athens (born c. 180 BC)—writing mid-2nd century BC—was the author of further material used by Strabo (see below); Apollodorus also relied upon Demetrius of Scepsis.
  - Jacoby, Felix (1929). Die Fragmente der griechischen Historiker II B. Berlin: Weidmann. 244, F 154-207.
  - Pfeiffer, R. (1968). History of Classical Scholarship: From the Beginnings to the End of the Hellenistic Age. Oxford: Oxford University Press. pp. 249–51. See Bittlestone/Diggle/Underhill (below): James Diggle at p. 508.
- Strabo (63/4 BC – c. AD 24) seems, at Geography 8.3.26, to identify Homer's Ithaca with Ithaki; but in 10.2.12, he seems rather to identify it with Lefkada.
  - Jones, P.V. (1917–1932). Strabo: Geography (Loeb Classical Library ed.). Cambridge, Massachusetts: Harvard University Press.
- William Gell—writing in 1807—believed that Homer's Ithaca was on the Aetos isthmus of Ithaki island, facing east, in or near the bay of Vathy.
  - The Geography and Antiquities of Ithaca. London: Longman, Hurst, Rees and Orme. 1807.
- William M. Leake—writing in 1835—thought that Ithaca was on the northwestern coast of Ithaki island, near Polis Bay.
  - Travels in the Morea with a Map and Plans. London: John Murray. 1830.
  - Travels in Northern Greece. London: John Murray. 835.
- Théophile Cailleux—writing in 1878—located Ithaca in south-west Spain, in the delta of the Guadalete, near Cádiz.
  - Pays atlantiques décrits par Homère, Ibérie, Gaule, Bretagne, Archipels, Amériques, Théorie nouvelle [Atlantic lands described by Homer: the Iberian peninsula, Gaul, Britain, the Atlantic islands, the Americas. A new theory] (in French). Paris: Maisonneuve et cie. 1878. OCLC 23413881.
- Samuel Butler developed a controversial theory: that the Odyssey came from the pen of a young Sicilian woman, who presents herself in the poem as Nausicaa, and that the scenes of the poem reflected the coast of Sicily, especially the territory of Trapani and its nearby islands. He described the purported evidence for this theory in his The Authoress of the Odyssey (1897), and in the introduction and footnotes to his prose translation of the Odyssey (1900). Robert Graves elaborated on this hypothesis in his novel Homer's Daughter.
- G. Volterras—writing in 1903—identified Ithaca with Paliki, believing that the latter may have once been an island due to the existence of "Strabo's channel" (Note: This putative hydronym is derived from a passage from Strabo's Geography, which has sometimes been taken to indicate that a channel once divided Cephalonia into two separate islands—with "Ithaca" being the western, and "Samos" the eastern—though this interpretation is controversial and not generally accepted.) at the isthmus which now separates Paliki and Kefalonia (see Bittlestone et al., below).
  - Kritiki Meleti peri Omerikis Ithakis [A Critical Study of Homeric Ithaca] (in Greek). Athens: [self?]. 1903.
- A.E.H. Goekoop—writing in 1908—believed Ithaca was in southwestern Kefalonia, on the St. George hilltop near Mazarakata village, southeast of the city of Argostoli, with its harbor at Minies (near the modern airport).
  - Ithaque La Grande [Ithaca the Great] (in French). Athens: Beck & Barth. 1908.
- Wilhelm Dörpfeld—writing in 1927—proposed, after performing extensive excavations at various locations of Ithaca and Lefkada, that the palace of Odysseus was located west of Nidri on the south coast of Lefkada.
  - Dörpfeld, Wilhelm (1965). Alt-Ithaka, ein Beitrag zur Homer-Frage. Studien und Ausgrabungen aus der insel Leukas-Ithaka. Unter Mitarbeit von Peter Goessler [u.a.] [Ancient Ithaca, a contribution to the Homer question. Studies and excavations from the island of Leucas-Ithaka. With the collaboration of Peter Goessler {among others}.] (in German) (Neudruck der Ausg. 1927 ed.). Osnabrück: Zeller.
- Lord Rennell of Rodd—writing in 1927—believed that Ithaca was on Ithaki island.
  - Rennell, J.R. (1927). Homer's Ithaca: A Vindication of Tradition. London: Arnold.
- Walter Abel Heurtley and his protégé Sylvia Benton—working in the late 1920s and early 1930s—believed that Ithaca was on Ithaki island; their excavations at the Polis Bay harbor turned up artifacts from the 8th to 9th centuries BC, and Benton also carried out excavations in the so-called Polis Cave that she interpreted in the light of an alleged connection to Odysseus. However, later research has shown that the structures there show no particular peculiarities for the possible lifetime of the hero.
- C.H. Goekoop (grandson of A.E.H. Goekoop)—writing in 1990—thought that Ithaca was on Kefalonia, but in the northern Erissos region, near the town of Fiscardo.
  - Op zoek naar Ithaka [In search of Ithaka] (in Dutch). Weesp: Heureka. 1990.
  - Where on Earth is Ithaca? A Quest for the Homeland of Odysseus. Delft: Eburon. 2010. ISBN 978-90-5972-344-3.
- E.S. Tsimaratos—published (posthumously) in 1998—thought that Ithaca was in central Kefalonia, agreeing with interpretations of Strabo that read him as indicating that Paliki was once cut off from the rest of Kefalonia.
  - Poia I Omeriki Ithaki? [Which is Homeric Ithaca?] (in Greek). Athens: Etaireias Meletes Ellenikes Historias. 1998.
- J.V. Luce (1920-2011)—writing in 1998—believed that Ithaca was on Ithaki island.
  - Celebrating Homer's landscapes: Troy and Ithaca Revisited. New Haven: Yale University Press. 1998. ISBN 0-300-07411-5.
- Nicolas G. Livadas (author) and Constantine Bisticas (editor, translator) locate Odysseus' palace on the Paliki peninsula of Kefalonia, near the village of Livadi.
  - Odysseus' Ithaca: The Riddle Solved. Athens: Nicholas G. Livadas. 2000. ISBN 960-90803-1-6.
- Henriette Putman Cramer and Gerasimos Metaxas have proposed that the center of Homeric Ithaca was in south-east Kefalonia, where the village of Poros (in the Eleios-Pronnoi municipality) is now situated.
  - Omiriki Ithaki – Ena atavtisto kentro sta nesia ton Kefallenon. Athens: Kaktos editions. 2000. ISBN 960-382-408-9.
- Gilles Le Noan—writing in 1989–2005—suggested Paliki as the location of Ithaca, but discounted the geology supporting "Strabo's channel".
  - A la recherche d'Ithaque, la ferme d'Eumée, le palais d'Ulysse [In search of Ithaca, the farm of Eumeus, the palace of Odysseus] (in French). Quincy-sous-Senart, France: Editions Tremen. 2005.
  - The Ithaca of the Sunset. Quincy-sous-Senart, France: Editions Tremen. 2005. ISBN 2-913559-44-1.
  - I kalódysi Itháki Η καλόδυση Ιθάκη [The beautiful Ithaca] (in Greek). Quincy-sous-Senart, France: Editions Tremen. 2005.
- Christos Tzakos—writing 1999–2005—believed Ithaca was on Ithaki island.
  - "Concerning Homeric Ithaki: Asteris". Odusseia (95). 1999.
  - "Kefa-ll-ines Kefa-ll-inia Kefa-ll-onia". Odusseia (70–2). 2000.
  - Ekthesi Synoptiki peri Omerikis Ithakis (A Brief Essay on Homeric Ithaca) (Angelos Eleutheros ed.). Athens. 2002.
  - Tzakos, Christos I. (2005). Ithaca and Homer (The Truth), translated by Geoffrey Cox. Athens. ISBN 960-7103-38-6.
- Robert Bittlestone, James Diggle, and John Underhill—first working in 2003—believe that Paliki is the location of Ithaca, and previously also held that "Strabo's channel" once separated Ithaca from the rest of Cephalonia (see: Odysseus Unbound), though the team has since recanted this particular aspect of their original proposal. This theory has not been generally accepted on grounds of geology, archaeology, philology, or historical and Homeric analysis. "What is clearly missing," wrote Dr. Christine Haywood, reviewing Odysseus Unbound, "is a good knowledge of the complexities of Homeric language, and the support of archaeology."
  - Odysseus Unbound: The Search for Homer's Ithaca. Cambridge, UK: Cambridge University Press. 2005. ISBN 0-521-85357-5. Odysseus Unbound website
- Athenagoras Eleutheriuo argued that Paxos was Homeric Ithaca.
  - I nisos ton paxon einai i omiriki Ithaki Η νησος των παξων ειναι η ομηρικη Ιθακη [The Island of Paxos is Homeric Ithaca)] (in Greek). Athenai: Eleusis. 2005. ISBN 978-9603-9103-0-5.
- Dimitris I. Paizis-Danias published ten maps of Cephallenian theories, and argued that Homer's Ithaca was on Ithaki.
  - Homer's Ithaca on Cephallenia? Facts and fancies in the history of an idea. Athens[?]: Ithacan Friends of Homer Association. 2006. ISBN 9-789608-823129.
- Felice Vinci has suggested that many Homeric places can be identified in the geographic landscape of the Baltic.
  - The Baltic Origins of Homer's Epic Tales. Rochester, Vermont: Inner Traditions. 2006. ISBN 1-59477-052-2.
- Manolis Koutlis placed Ithaca on Faial, in the Azores.
  - In the Shadow - The Greek Colonies of North America and the Atlantic 1500 BC - 1500 AD. Limassol: Solva-tech LTD. 2018. ISBN 978-9925-7439-5-7.
- Professor Thanasis J. Papadopoulos located Ithaca on Ithaki, after a team from the University of Ioannina—led by himself and his wife, fellow archaeologist Professor Litsa Kontorli-Papadopoulou—excavated the "School of Homer" archaeological site in northern Ithaki. They concluded it was actually a Mycenaean citadel in line with a Bronze Age civilisation around the supposed time of Odysseus, or of a figure which may have inspired the Homeric poems. The site is now referred to as the "Palace of Odysseus" and was presented by the authors to the University in 2016.
  - The Excavation at Agios Athanasios / School of Homer. London: Jane Cochrane. 2022. ISBN 1916292380.
- Jane Cochrane—writing in 2019—located Ithaca on Ithaki after analysing the context provided in the poem against the geography and archaeology of the island, with the assistance of classics professor George L. Huxley.
  - Odysseus' Island. London: Jane Cochrane. 2019. ISBN 978-1916292314.
- Jonathan Brown located Ithaca on Ithaki after travelling to Kefalonia, Corfu, Sicily, Spain, Denmark, and the Azores to examine other theories; he has since published a meta-analysis on the topic, covering geographic, historical, and archaeological evidence.
  - In Search of Homeric Ithaca. Canberra: Parrot Press. 2020. ISBN 978-0-6480925-2-0. National Library of Australia, Trove
- Makis Metaxis, former Mayor of Cephalonia, located Ithaca on Cephalonia (also transcribed—as above—as Kefalonia) at the site of a Myceanean tholos.
  - Ward, Seth; Younger, James (August 28, 2024). Odysseus Returns (Television production).

== See also ==
- Geography of the Odyssey
- Historicity of the Homeric epics
- Trojan War
- Where Troy Once Stood

== Notes and references ==
=== References ===
- Several of the floruit dates above are taken from Wikipedia articles about the writers.
