= Lamus (mythology) =

Greek mythological figures with same name

In Greek mythology, Lamus (Ancient Greek: Λάμος Lamos) may refer to the following personages:

- Lamus, one of the 3,000 river gods, children of the Titans Oceanus and his sister-wife Tethys. He was the Cilician river-god who fathered the naiads, Lamides, caretakers of the child Dionysus. These nymphs were maddened by Hera.
- Lamus, a Lydian son of Heracles by Queen Omphale. In some accounts, he was called Agelaus.
- Lamus, a defender of Thebes against the Seven Against Thebes. He was killed by Parthenopaeus who pierced him in the face during the battle.
- Lamus, a Trojan warrior who was killed by Thoas, leader of the Aetolians, during the Trojan War.
- Lamus, a former king of the Laestrygonians, the cannibalistic giants who were later met by the hero Odysseus in one of his journeys. He was the son of Poseidon. Lamus was said to have built Formiae, the ancient seat of his people.
- Lamus, an ally of Turnus, the man who opposed Aeneas in Italy. He was killed by Nisus.
