= Laestrygon (mythology) =

Greek mythological figure

In Greek mythology, Laestrygon (Ancient Greek: Λαιστρυγών Laistrygon) was the son of Poseidon and possibly of Gaia. He was the father of Telepora or Telepatra, wife of Aeolus, keeper of the winds.

== Mythology ==
According to one account, the giant cannibal race of the Laestrygonians was said to have borne from Laestrygon in the isle of Ortygia, Italy.

[The Sons of Boreas pursued the Harpies all the way to Italy:] — and about the steep Fawn mountain and rugged Etna to the isle Ortygia and the people sprung from Laestrygon who was the son of wide-reigning Poseidon.
