= Karel Jozef de Graeve =

- Born: October 23, 1731 (or 1736); Ursel
- Died: August 2, 1805; Sint-Denijs-Westrem
- Education: Old University of Leuven
- Occupations: Writer, Jurist
- Spouse: Françoise Cathérine Kervyn de Oud Mooreghem (m. 1789)
- Writing career
- Language: Flemish
- Genre: Historical works
- Subjects: Juridical, officialese, history
- Notable works: République des Champs Elysées, ou Monde ancien

Karel Jozef de Graeve (October 23, 1731, Ursel – August 2, 1805, Sint-Denijs-Westrem) − usually written Charles-Joseph De Grave after the French invasion− was Raadsheer in the Flemish Court and author of juridical, officialese and historical works.

== Life ==
Karel Jozef de Graeve was born in 1731 (according to some sources in 1736) as son of Regina Verstraeten and Jan de Graeve, Secretary to the parish of Ursel.

He studied literature, philosophy and law at the Old University of Leuven. In 1789, over the age of fifty, he married Françoise Cathérine Kervyn de Oud Mooreghem (1744–1824), widow of Jean-Pierre Zoetaert, Secretary to the Raad van Vlaanderen, the highest court of the County of Flanders.

In 1760 Karel Jozef de Graeve became lawyer in Gent and for some time functioned as Pensionary to the city of Bruges. In Ghent again from 1773 he worked as schepen to the local government and was mainly occupied with the city finances. As such he was second in command after first schepen Jean Jacques Philippe Vilain XIIII.

In 1775 he was appointed Raadsheer in the main court of the county, called the Raad van Vlaanderen.

He contributed in a protest by the States of Flanders against the policies of Joseph II, Holy Roman Emperor in 1787. A few days after his work on a manifesto on November 4, 1789, on behalf of the Flemish Court concerning the Austrian government the Patriots conquered Ghent and de Graeve was appointed member of the 'Comité civil' that was in charge of the town. The states of Flanders appointed him as interim Pensionary, in replacement of François d'Hoop, who was loyal to the Emperor.

== Publications ==
De Graeve contributed to the writing of a protest by the States of Flanders against the intended reforms by Joseph II in 1787.

On November 5, 1789, he composed a conception for a manifesto, on behalf of the Court of Flanders, written in Alexandrines, that was meant to be sent to the Austrian government, seated in Brussels.

Meanwhile, De Graeve finished a historical work, that was published postumely by his friends in 1806 in three volumes under the title: République des Champs Elysées, ou Monde ancien.
