= Telepylos =

City in Greek Mythology

Coordinates: 36.5422487°N 22.3888904°E

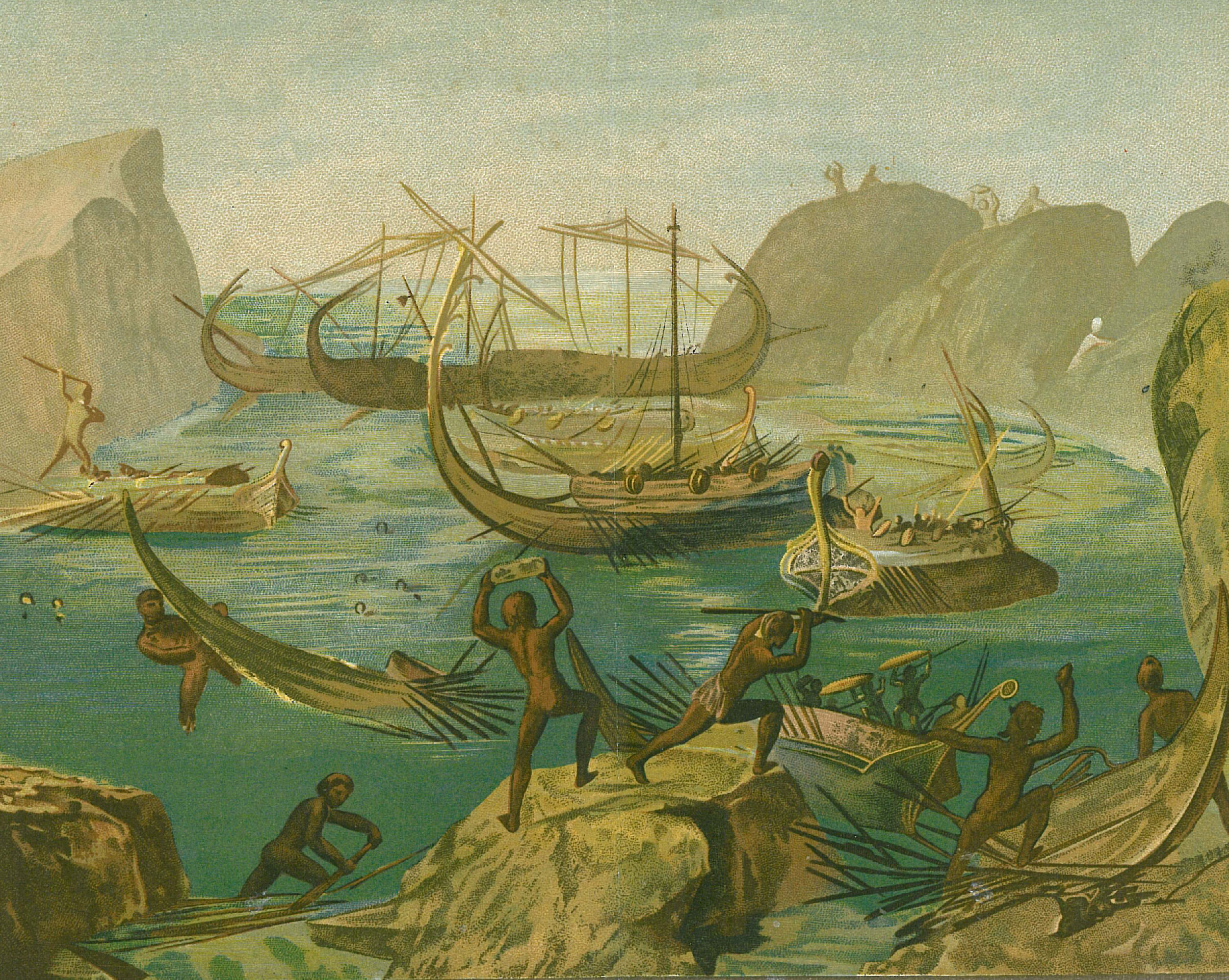
The Laestrygonians throw rocks at Odysseus and his men.

Telepylos or Telepylus (Ancient Greek: Τηλέπυλος Tēlépylos, meaning "far-off port" or "big-gated") was the mythological city of the Laestrygonians.

== Mythology ==
In the Odyssey it is described as the rocky stronghold of Lamos. When Odysseus reaches the city in the Odyssey, he sends three scouts to explore the island. They come across the king, a giant cannibal, who then eats one of the men, causing the other scouts to run away. Most of Odysseus' men are killed in the incident, but his boat is moored outside the Laestrygonians' harbour. He is able to sail away, without the bombardment of rocks received by the rest of the fleet who did moor within the harbour. Only forty-five men escape.

It has been identified with Mezapo, located on the Mani Peninsula. Iman Jacob Wilkens makes a less likely identification: the harbour of Havana, Cuba, believing that Ulysses had in fact crossed the Atlantic Ocean.

The harbour, about which on both sides a sheer cliff runs continuously, and projecting headlands opposite to one another stretch out at the mouth, and the entrance is narrow, ..., and the ships were moored within the hollow harbour, for therein no wave ever swelled, great or small, but all about was a bright calm...

== Locations ==
In Greek mythology, the name Telepylos is mentioned in the Odyssey (k 82, ps 318) the city or country of the Laistrygons ("laistrygonii"). The name (tēlē, "far"; pulos, "door"), perhaps according to some authors has the meaning of "eurypylos, megalopylos", or "macropylos" (Eustathius: "at a distance from each other, but next to the doors or at the length " ). In the view of the later ancient Greeks (e.g. Thucydides, 6.2), Telepilos was located in Sicily, while the Romans believed it to be located in mainland Italy, in Formia (today Mola di Gaeta). The significant Laestrygonian associations with the Talayotic culture or pre-Talayotic culture in Balearic Islands have recently been admitted, and the description indicates perhaps an early build of the port of Mahón. Jasen Boko establishes Omiš as the most probable location, for its unique landscape that corresponds to the verses.
