= Homer's Daughter =

1955 novel by Robert Graves

- First edition (publ. Cassell)
- Author: Robert Graves
- Language: English
- Publication date: 1955

Homer's Daughter is a 1955 novel by British author Robert Graves, famous for I, Claudius and The White Goddess.

The novel starts from the idea that Homer's Odyssey was written by a princess in the Greek settlements in Sicily. The novel makes an entirely speculative reconstruction of who she was and why she wrote such a work. It has her modifying the legends that existed in her own time to partly match a crisis in her own life. The idea that a woman wrote the works of Homer was initially proposed by Samuel Butler, who developed the theory in The Authoress of the Odyssey. Graves elaborated from Butler's theory in his novel.

Homer's Daughter is not as famous as the Claudius novels, but has its admirers.
