= Nausicaa (opera) =

1961 opera by Glanville-Hicks

- Opera by Peggy Glanville-Hicks
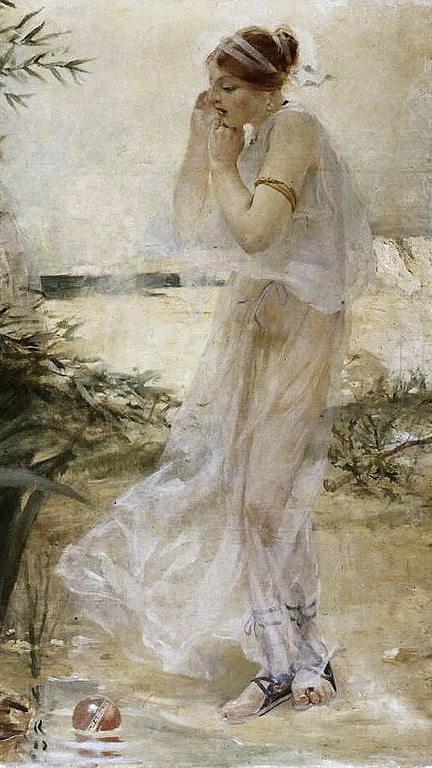
- Jean Veber - Ulysses and Nausica (detail), 1888
- Translation: Ναυσικά (in Greek)
- Librettist: Robert Graves, Alastair Reid
- Language: English and Greek
- Based on: Robert Graves' Homer's Daughter
- Premiere: 19 August 1961; Odeon of Herodes Atticus
- Other: Prologue and 3 Acts

Nausicaa (Greek: Ναυσικά, Greek pronunciation: [nafsiˈka]) is an opera in three acts by the Australian composer and music critic Peggy Glanville-Hicks. Most of the work's libretto was sourced from Robert Graves' 1955 novel Homer's Daughter, and it was written by Graves and the librettist Alastair Reid; the soloists' words were set in English and the choruses in Greek. In terms of rhythm, form and melody, the opera's music echoes the Greek musical tradition.

The opera's story is an adaptation of the myth of Nausicaa and Odysseus. In the libretto, Odysseus is replaced by "Aethon", a shipwrecked nobleman from Crete, who, upon reaching a shore after the shipwreck, gets to meet Nausicaa, a princess romantically besieged by a set of suitors taking advantage of her father's absence. Aethon enters the palace disguised as a beggar and, following goddess Athena's instructions, eventually manages to exterminate the suitors and marry Nausicaa. Following Graves' work, the opera's fable concludes with the depiction of Nausicaa as the author of a different version of the Odyssey.

The opera was composed from 1958 to 1960 for the Athens Festival, at which it was premiered on 1961, with soprano Teresa Stratas embodying the title role at the Odeon of Herodes Atticus. More than 150 contributors collaborated for a total of three performances at the festival, after which the opera became one of the two best known works by the composer, the other being The Transposed Heads. Despite its success, the opera has not yet been produced since 1961.

== Conception and libretto ==
=== The initial idea ===
According to Glanville-Hicks, the study of the Hungarian composer Béla Bartók's archives of the traditional music of the peoples of Central Europe further lead her to the traditional music of Greece; it was thus that she decided to create an opera based on a Greek theme. Initially, she chose Thornton Wilder's novel The Woman of Andros, but the writer denied her the permission to adapt the book for an opera.

The composer had expressed her interest in the literary work of the Hellenist writer Robert Graves long before the conceptualisation of Nausicaa. This particular idea emerged after she read Grave's Homer's Daughter, a novel based on the theory that Odyssey was written by a female writer. In Glanville-Hicks' own words:

[...] a good opera story is a good ballet story. If you can see who does what to which and what the result is, without understanding a word of what they're saying, all to the good.

To her, Graves' tale was a "perfectly good story" and one that was "perfectly good for opera". Consequently, Glanville-Hicks came in contact with the writer, asking him to adapt his work for the opera she was planning to create.

=== The libretto ===
Graves accepted the composer's proposal, and they worked together from 1956 to 1958 on the opera's libretto, the text that would then be set in music by the composer. During this time, Glanville-Hicks asked for the aid of her friend, librettist Alastair Reid and then moved to the island of Mallorca, where Graves had settled a decade before, in 1946. Most importantly, the two Guggenheim Fellowships she received for the years 1956-1957 and 1957-1958, allowed her to work on the opera's libretto undisrupted by other job assignments.

The composer chose the English language for the main scenic action (i.e. the soloists' musical interlocutions and monologues), reserving the Greek language for the choruses, a decision she herself described as "very helpful to those in the audience speaking only Greek", for the chorus typically comments on the soloists' actions.

== Music ==
Audio excerpt from Nausicaa
- Recorded in 1961, soon after the premiere at the Odeon of Herodes Atticus
- Nausicaa: Opera in Three Acts by Peggy Glanville-Hicks - National Film and Sound Archive of Australia

Beginning in 1958, Glanville-Hicks finished the opera's composition on 30 April 1960. Her settling in Athens in 1959 coincided with her rising interest in further studying the Greek traditional music, the composition's foundational theme. As she put it, Greek traditional music "has the old sound", with "the rhythm built within the melody"; during a previous stage of her career, the composer had attempted to create music by constructing the melody over the rhythm but, in her own words, such a feat required "a lot of percussion instruments", whose percussionists were sparse, making all the related projects "very expensive" and causing many objections. Thus, she aimed at achieving the desired rhythm with fewer instruments utilised "in a more organic way".

In search of a music that had the rhythm built within it, she went on to visit more than 30 Greek islands, recording their local music on tape. Furthermore, she researched the archives of the Academy of Athens looking for useful ideas and then incorporated musical elements from the traditions of Epirus, the Peloponnese, Crete and the Dodecanese in her composition.

In the notes of the 1961 recording of the opera, Glanville-Hicks explained in detail her rationale behind the choice of Greek traditional music for her Ancient Greek themed opera:

Rural singers and performers in Greece today still improvise in the ancient modes and meters, and a given melody may be two or two thousand years old.

From analysis of the Greek folk idiom it is clear that the genre belongs to a common ancient classic type that persists in remnants through the Middle and Far East [...]
Though the Greeks use mode and meter common to Yugoslavia, Turkey, Persia, or India, their use of these abstract entities has a flavor peculiarly its own, peculiarly Greek and evocative of the Greek temperament and of the light that floods the Grecian sea —and landscape.

It is this flavor, together with the considerations of musical malleability for extended development that has guided my choice and use of material.

The composer considered the "melodic outline" of an opera's music to be the summation of the various components of the prosody of the libretto's words. She expressed the opinion that by applying this idea in the composition of Nausicaa and elsewhere, she had made it possible for every word to be "heard pretty well". In accordance to the opera's libretto, its music also has a dual character; for the main scenic action, the composer created a more stylistically personal music set in English and aimed at the more sophisticated international audience of the premiere. For the choruses, she composed music echoing the Greek traditional songs, which appealed to the much more massive Greek-speaking audience of the opera's first presentation.

In a contemporary review published in Time, Nausicaa's music is defined as "bony and strong, like the Greek landscape" and the fact that the composer willingly chose to use an orchestra of just 60 instruments for the play is also noted. In the same review, the opera's vocal parts are characterised as "highly declamatory", while the "use of the metric cadence of Greek folk song" is described as a means of intensifying their dramatic effect.

== Athens Festival premiere ==
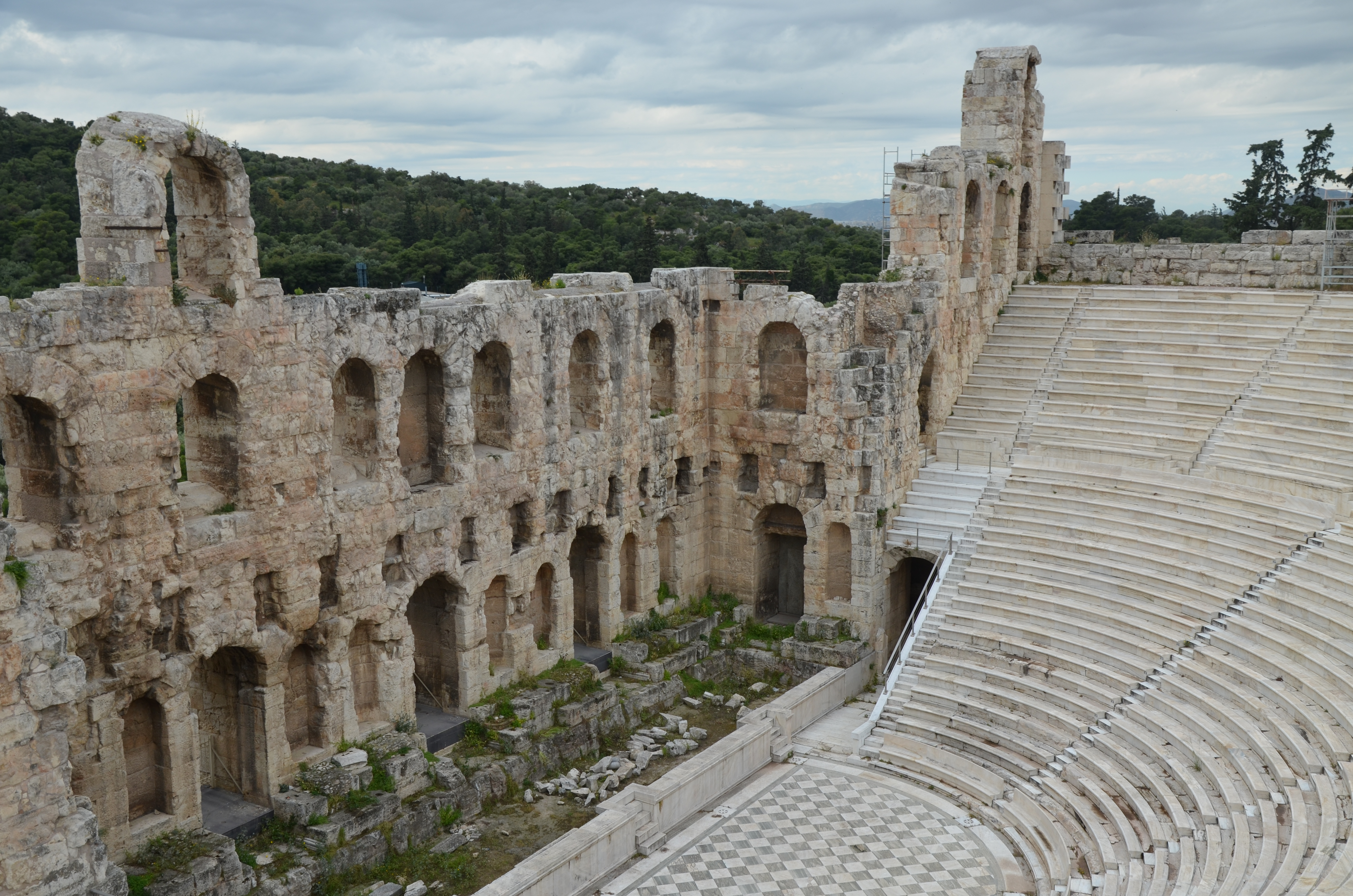
The interior of the 5,000-seat Odeon of Herodes Atticus

In 1959, the composer and the directors of the Athens Festival agreed on incorporating Nausicaa in the festival's programme. Glanville-Hicks herself undertook to tackle the various problems of organising the opera's premiere, including picking the soloists and advertising the event.

At first, she offered the leading role to the world-renowned soprano Maria Callas. However, Callas had already arranged to appear as Norma at the ancient theatre of Epidaurus in 1960 and thus informed Glanville-Hicks that she could not undertake the role. Eventually, the composer picked four upcoming soloists for the leading roles, all of whom had Greek origin, so that they could deal with the opera's linguistic duality. The role of Nausicaa was given to soprano Teresa Stratas and that of Aethon to the baritone John Modinos, while the baritone Spiro Malas was chosen to portray King Alcinous and the mezzo-soprano Sophia Steffan was given the part of Queen Arete.

Nausicaa premiered a year after its composition was completed, on 19 August 1961, at the Odeon of Herodes Atticus. More than 150 contributors worked for the opera's first performance; Carlos Surinach was the maestro, John Butler the theatrical director and choreographer and Andreas Nomikos took on the opera's scenography and costume design. The sets were dominated by a stone structure and the costumes were of Greek character, richly decorated with gems; Butler's choreographies were based on Greek traditional dances.

The opera's inaugural performance was enthusiastically received by the capacity audience of around 4,800, among which were Glanville-Hicks, Robert Graves and John Butler. Variety reported that a "ten minute ovation" greeted the cast, winning "eight curtain calls from the capacity crowd", and that Butler's staging was "top drawer". The first presentation received numerous laudatory reviews from all over the world. Following its premiere, the work came to be considered as Glanville-Hicks' great success —paralleled only to her opera The Transposed Heads— and it brought her wide acclaim for the rest of her career. Overall, Nausicaa was presented three times during the Athens Festival, to a full house on all occasions. Despite its success, the opera has not yet been produced since its 1961 performances. (Note: In 2014, a performance edition of the score was prepared by the Australian conductor Mario Dobernig, as part of his PhD thesis for the Melbourne Conservatorium of Music.)

== Roles ==
| Role | Voice type | Premiere cast (19 August 1961, Odeon of Herodes Atticus) |
|---|---|---|
| Nausicaa, daughter of King Alcinous and Queen Arete | soprano | Teresa Stratas |
| Aethon, shipwrecked nobleman from Crete | baritone | John Modinos |
| Alcinous, King of Drepanum | baritone | Spiro Malas |
| Arete, Queen of Drepanum | mezzo-soprano | Sophia Steffan |
| Phemius, the palace's aoidos | tenor | Edward Ruhl |
| Clytoneus, Nausicaa's young brother | tenor | George Tsantikos |
| Antinous, suitor | tenor | Michalis Heliotis |
| Eurymachus, suitor | tenor | George Moutsios |
| Priest | tenor | Michalis Heliotis |
| Messenger | baritone | Vassilis Koundouris |
| Chorus | various | Greek National Opera chorus |

== Synopsis ==
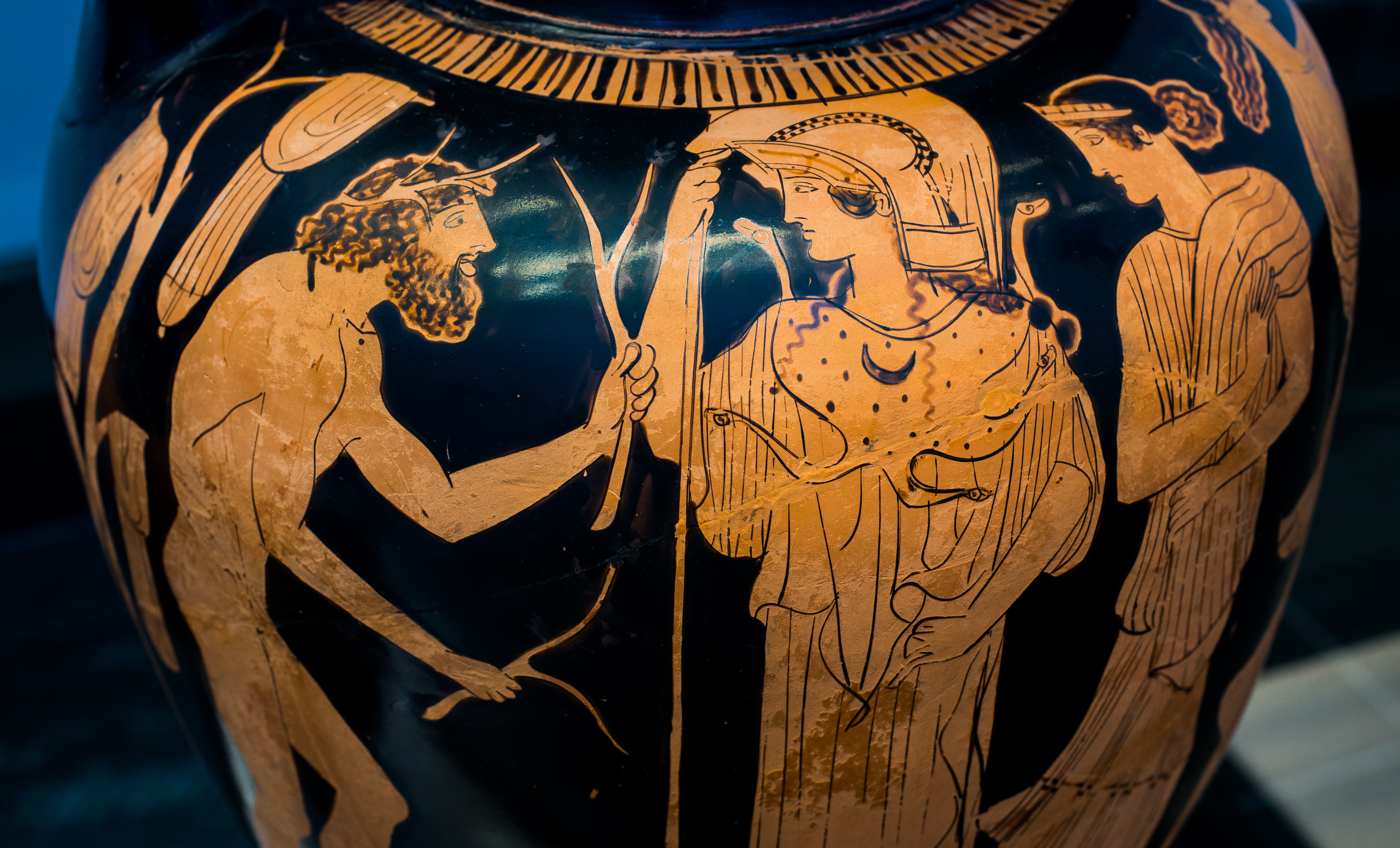
Odysseus ("Aethon" in the opera), meets Nausicaa with the help of goddess Athena. Red-figure amphora, 450-440 BCE, Bavarian State Archaeological Collection

The libretto is an adaptation of the myth of Nausicaa and Odysseus, based on Robert Graves' novel Homer's Daughter, set in the Palace of Drepanum, a Greek city-state in Western Sicily, during the 7th century BCE by approximation. The opera's leading role is an amalgamation of the mythical figures of the Odyssey, Penelope and Nausicaa. The mythical Odysseus is rendered as "Aethon", a shipwrecked nobleman from Crete who courts Nausicaa. In accordance with the work of Robert Graves, a secondary theme of the libretto is the depiction of Nausicaa as the author of an altered version of the Odyssey.

=== Prologue ===
In the opera's short prologue, Nausicaa converses with the aoidos Phemius regarding the role Penelope had in the Odyssey.

=== Act I ===
The King of Drepanum Alcinous departs to search for his son Laodamas, who has mysteriously gone missing. Before leaving, Alcinous stipulates that his daughter is to choose the suitor she prefers on her own criteria.

An interlude follows, in which Nausicaa and her mother, Queen Arete, discuss the possibility that Laodamas is dead. Then, they express their fear to Nausicaa's brother and Arete's son, Clytoneus. At that moment, the three of them overhear Antinous, Eurymachus and two more suitors discussing a plot to overthrow the king. Nausicaa calls on the goddess Athena for help.

Next follows the characteristic scene of the emergence of Aethon (originally Odysseus) from the sea; Nausicaa's maids are washing clothes at a spring by the seashore when the shipwrecked Aethon emerges from the waters and asks them for shelter. Taking his sudden appearance as the goddess Athena's response to her plea for help, Nausicaa decides to take Aethon to the palace, disguising him as a beggar.

=== Act II ===
In the second act, the conspiracy of the suitors unfolds; they have settled in the palace and the aoidos Phemius is entertaining them. Nausicaa and Clytoneus ask them to leave and the beggar-Aethon is enraged by their hubristic stance. Clytoneus asks for the help of his third brother, Halius, who lives in exile in a nearby city. Nausicaa reveals to Clytoneus the identity of the beggar and, in the interlude that follows, reprimands Phemius for providing entertainment to her father's foes.

Aethon then professes his love to Nausicaa and Queen Arete discovers his true identity. Clytoneus returns bearing 50 arrows as a sign of help from his brother. Nausicaa announces that any suitor who succeeds in arching the Great Bow of Hercules located in the palace will be able to claim her in marriage. Fearing that some suitor will succeed in winning the contest instead of Aethon, and receiving an oracle that a wedding that very night would solve the problem, Queen Arete immediately arranges the marriage of Nausicaa and Aethon.

=== Act III ===
Subsequently, Nausicaa marries Aethon, who then wins the contest against the suitors and proceeds to exterminate them one by one. However, via Nausicaa's intervention, Phemius' life is spared. The King returns and, after inspecting the situation, decides to reward his daughter for her prowess. Nausicaa's wish is for Phemius to henceforth sing her own version of Penelope's story. The aoidos reluctantly accepts and the opera is concluded in an atmosphere of general merriment.

== Recordings ==
- August 1961 (remastered 2007): Composers Recording Inc., Athens Symphony Orchestra & Chorus of Men and Women, Carlos Surinach (the recording includes fragments from Acts I & II, and Act III in its entirety).
