= Nausicaa (disambiguation) =

Nausicaa is a character in Homer's epic poem Odyssey.

Nausicaa, Nausicaä, or Nausikaa, derived from the Greek name Nαυσικάα, may also refer to:

- Nausicaa Bonnín (born 1985), Spanish actress
- Narumi Yasuda (born 1966), nicknamed "Miss Nausicaä", Japanese actress and singer
- Nausicaä (Nausicaä of the Valley of the Wind), the main character of Hayao Miyazaki's manga series Nausicaä of the Valley of the Wind
- Nausica Bianchetti, a character in the television series Maggie & Bianca: Fashion Friends
- Nausicaa (Leighton), an 1878 painting by Frederic Leighton
- Nausicaa (opera), a 1961 opera by Peggy Glanville-Hicks
- "Nausicaa" (Ulysses episode) an episode in James Joyce's novel Ulysses
- Nausicaá Centre National de la Mer, a public aquarium in Boulogne-sur-Mer, France
- Nausicaa.net, a fan website about Studio Ghibli, Hayao Miyazaki, and related topics
- 192 Nausikaa, an asteroid named after the Greek mythology character
- Nausikaa Lake, a lake in Lee Township, Ontario, Canada
- Nausicaa, a 1971 film by Agnès Varda
- The homeworld of the Nausicaans, a fictional species in Star Trek
- "Nausicaä (Love Will Be Revealed)", a song by Cameron Winter from his 2024 album Heavy Metal

== See also ==
- Nausicaä of the Valley of the Wind (disambiguation)
