= Halius =

In Greek mythology, Halius (Ancient Greek: Ἅλιόν or Ἅλιός means 'of the sea') may refer to the following characters:

- Halius, a Lycian warrior who followed their leader, Sarpedon, to fight in the Trojan War. He was slain by the Greek hero Odysseus during the siege of Troy.
- Halius, a Phaeacian prince as son of King Alcinous of Scheria and Arete. He was the brother of Nausicaa, Clytoneus and Laodamas. Halius and his brother were the winners of the foot-racing contest in honour of Odysseus.
- Halius, one of the Suitors of Penelope who came from Zacynthus along with other 43 wooers. He, with the other suitors, was killed by Odysseus with the aid of Eumaeus, Philoetius, and Telemachus.
- Halius, one of the companions of Aeneas in Italy. He was killed by Turnus, the man who opposed Aeneas in Italy.
