= The Odyssey (1997 miniseries) =

American television series directed by Andrei Konchalovsky

- Poster with Calypso, Athena, and Penelope (left to right) below Odysseus
- Based on: Odyssey by Homer
- Written by: Andrei Konchalovsky
- Directed by: Andrei Konchalovsky
- Starring: Armand Assante; Greta Scacchi; Isabella Rossellini; Vanessa Williams; Bernadette Peters; Alan Stenson; Eric Roberts
- Composer: Eduard Artemyev
- Countries of origin: United States; Australia
- Original language: English

Production
- Producers: Nicholas Meyer; Francis Ford Coppola; Dyson Lovell
- Cinematography: Sergey Kozlov
- Editor: Michael Ellis
- Running time: 176 minutes (2 parts)
- Production companies: Hallmark Entertainment; American Zoetrope
- Budget: $40 million

Original release
- Network: NBC
- Release: May 18 – May 19, 1997

The Odyssey is a 1997 American mythology–adventure television miniseries based on the ancient Greek epic poem by Homer, the Odyssey. Directed by Andrei Konchalovsky and co-produced by Hallmark Entertainment and American Zoetrope, the miniseries aired in two parts beginning on May 18, 1997, on NBC. It was filmed in Malta, Turkey, parts of England and many other places around the Mediterranean, where the story takes place. The cast includes Armand Assante, Greta Scacchi, Irene Papas, Isabella Rossellini, Bernadette Peters, Eric Roberts, Geraldine Chaplin, Jeroen Krabbé, Christopher Lee and Vanessa Williams.

At the 49th Primetime Emmy Awards the series won the award for Outstanding Directing for a Miniseries or Special.

== Plot ==
=== Part 1 ===
Odysseus is called to service by Agamemnon in the Trojan War after the birth of his son Telemachus, much to the dismay of his wife, Penelope. Concerned that he may not return, Odysseus urges his wife to remarry if Telemachus reaches manhood so that Ithaca will have a proper king to teach him his responsibilities.

The war lasts ten years, during which the legendary hero, Achilles, is killed. Odysseus forges a plan to end the fighting and conquer Troy by using a giant wooden horse to sneak inside. The priest Laocoon tries to warn the Trojans but is suddenly devoured by a sea monster. After sacking Troy, Odysseus' ego gets the best of him and he mocks the gods for their assistance, claiming it was he alone who achieved victory. This defiance angers Poseidon - who had slain Laocoon - and he swears Odysseus will never return home.

While sailing home, a thick fog from Poseidon causes Odysseus' crew to shipwreck on the island of the Cyclopes. A Cyclops named Polyphemus traps them in his cave, but Odysseus - who introduces himself as "Nobody" - gets him drunk on wine, causing him to pass out. Then, he sharpens a tree branch into a stake and blinds Polyphemus, allowing them to escape by hiding under sheep skins when he removes the heavy stone blocking the door. Polyphemus screams for help to his brothers, but due to Odysseus' trick, shouts that "nobody" has hurt him. Odysseus taunts Polyphemus with his true name, not knowing that the giant's father is Poseidon. Hearing his son's pleas for revenge, Poseidon vows an even crueler punishment for Odysseus.

Odysseus visits the court of Aeolus, god of the wind, who provides him with a bag of winds to help him home; the crew, believing that their king is hiding a valuable treasure, open the bag too early and are blown far off into the sea just days from Ithaca. They find themselves at the palace of Circe, a beautiful witch, who tricks them into eating food that transforms them into wild animals. The gods pity Odysseus and send Hermes to instruct him in the use of moly, which protects him from Circe so that he may confront her.

Circe restores the crew to their human selves once Odysseus swears to spend five days with her, but he then realizes that she has cast an illusion, causing him to spend five years instead. He rushes to the shore in disbelief, finding his ship buried into the sand by the tide. When he threatens to kill Circe for deceiving him, she tells him that only the seer Tiresias can guide him home. Given the fact that Tiresias is long dead, Odysseus needs to travel to the Underworld. Odysseus unearths his ship and sails into the Underworld with guidance from the gods. Back on Ithaca, several suitors appear, intending to marry Penelope, much to the resentment of the now-grown Telemachus.

=== Part 2 ===
Arriving at the Underworld, Odysseus finds Tiresias on the plains of Elysium. The prophet torments him, recognizing his courage and wit but criticizing his ego and foolishness. After Odysseus sacrifices a ram into the River Styx, Tiresias shows him that the only way home is to sail past a treacherous isle where the monsters Scylla and Charybdis live. Odysseus then encounters his mother Anticlea, who had committed suicide on the pain of losing her son. She warns him that he must return home, or his crown and wife will be lost to him forever.

Penelope states that she will pick a suitor only after weaving the burial shroud for her elderly father-in-law Laertes - however, she unpicks the shroud at night to weave it again the next day. Her plan seems to work until a suitor named Eurymachus learns the truth from Melanthe, the handmaiden he seduces. He and the other suitors then resort to terrorizing the inhabitants of Ithaca with their entourages until Penelope agrees to marry.

Odysseus' boat nears the isle of Scylla and Charybdis. Three of the crew are devoured by Scylla, and the boat is destroyed by Charybdis. Odysseus is separated from the survivors (Anticlus, Perimides, and Eurybates) and washes up on the isle, where the goddess Calypso lives. She entrances the king and forces him to stay with her for two years. Telemachus, desperate to uncover his father's fate, prays to Athena, who instructs him to sail for Sparta and seek out Menelaus, one of Odysseus' former comrades. When Telemachus finds Menelaus, the king tells him he believes Odysseus to be dead, given the fact that if he were alive, he would have returned to his family. Back on Ithaca, the suitors plot to murder Telemachus, viewing him as a threat.

Hermes orders Calypso to release Odysseus in accordance with the will of the Fates. While sailing home on a raft, he is confronted by Poseidon himself in a fierce storm. A battle of wills follows; Odysseus demands to know what he has done to deserve the god's wrath and is told that he must accept his place as a mortal man whose glory is only allowed by the generosity of Olympus. The next morning, an unconscious Odysseus is found by a party of Phaeacian girls who serve the princess Nausicaa. By her order, Odysseus is secretly taken to a remote harbor in Ithaca.

Telemachus survives a confrontation with the suitor Antinous and reunites with his father. With Athena magically disguising him as a ragged peasant, he arrives at his former home just as Penelope decides to hold a contest among the suitors, willing to choose the one who can restring her husband's bow and use it. After Odysseus wins the contest, Athena lifts his disguise. Odysseus, assisted by Telemachus, slays Eurymachus and the other suitors. Once the suitors are dead, Odysseus is finally reunited with Penelope.

== Cast ==
- Armand Assante as Odysseus
- Greta Scacchi as Penelope
- Geraldine Chaplin as Eurycleia
- Jeroen Krabbé as Alcinous
- Christopher Lee as Tiresias
- Irene Papas as Anticlea
- Bernadette Peters as Circe
- Michael J. Pollard as Aeolus
- Eric Roberts as Eurymachus
- Isabella Rossellini as Athena
- Vanessa Williams as Calypso
- Alan Stenson as Telemachus
  - Josh Maguire as Young Telemachus
- Yorgo Voyagis as King Agamemnon
- Nicholas Clay as King Menelaus
- William Houston as Anticlus
- Ron Cook as Eurybates
- Michael Tezcan as Eurylochus
- Roger Ashton-Griffiths as Polites
- Alan Cox as Elpenor
- Adoni Anastasse as Perimides
- Stewart Thompson as Antiphus
- Paloma Baeza as Melanthe
- Reid Asato as Polyphemus
- Mark Hill as Orsilicus
- Pat Kelman as Elatus
- Vincenzo Nicoli as Antinous
- Tony Vogel as Eumaeus
- Sally Plumb as Arete (Queen Alcinous)
- Katie Carr as Nausicaa
- Marius Combo as Agelaus
- Oded Levy as Leocrites
- Peter Page as Philoetius
- Heathcote Williams as Laocoon, a soothsayer
- Richard Truett as Achilles
- Peter Woodthorpe as Mentor
- Derek Lea as Hektor
- Freddy Douglas as Hermes
- Miles Anderson as Poseidon (voice)
- Alan Smithie as King Priam of Troy
- Vernon Dobtcheff as Aegyptius

== Filming ==
=== Special effects ===
The creature effects for this miniseries were provided by Jim Henson's Creature Shop, including a talking animatronic pig roasting on a spit, a CGI for Scylla, a rod puppet sea slug-like sea monster that devours Laocoön, and the full-bodied version of Polyphemus.

The boat used in the series was reused a few years later for the Jason and the Argonauts miniseries.

=== Rating ===
MPAA rated this film PG-13 for violent sequences and some sensuality.

== Reception ==
The series received mostly positive reviews from critics. On Rotten Tomatoes, it holds a rating of 79% from 48 reviews with the consensus: "The Odyssey delivers an exhilarating, visually spectacular retelling of Homer's epic, buoyed by a committed international cast and a brisk sense of adventure."

Not all reviews were positive however. Variety called it "[...] a straight adventure tale without insight or depth." The A.V. Club called the miniseries "tacky" and Assante's performance as "stiff". Richard Nilsen, writing for The Arizona Republic, stated, "Even though the made-for-TV movie is only four hours long, I wasted a fifth stewing over how godawful it was."

== Viewership ==
The Odyssey averaged 20.6 million viewers for its first episode and 17.8 million for the second episode, with the miniseries also becoming the first "made-for-TV movie" in four years to rank first in weekly total viewership.

== See also ==
- Greek mythology in popular culture
- List of historical drama films
