= Greek garden =

Type of garden

Greek gardens were created in ancient Greece, and Hellenistic gardens were created in late classical times under the influence of Greek culture. Relatively little is known about either type of garden.

== Minoan gardens ==
Before the coming of Proto-Greeks into the Aegean area, Minoan culture depicted gardens, in the form of subtly tamed, wild-looking landscapes. These gardens were shown in frescoes, notably in a stylized, floral, sacred landscape with some Egyptianizing features; this landscape was represented in the fragments of a Middle Minoan fresco at Amnisos, northeast of Knossos. In the east wing of the palace at Phaistos, fissures and tool-trimmed holes may once have been made. In the post-Minoan world, Mycenaean art concentrated on human interactions, while the natural world took a reduced role; following the collapse of Mycenaean palace culture and the associated loss of literacy, pleasure gardens were probably not a feature of the Greek Dark Age.

== Literature ==
In the eighth century BC, the works of Homer included a reference to gardens—the Neverland of Alcinous, in the mythical Phaeacia. This region was as distant from the world of Homer's listeners as was the heroic world of Achaeans that he recreated, with significant poetic license: "We live far off", said Nausicaa, "surrounded by the stormy sea, the outermost of men, and no other mortals have dealing with us."

Now, you'll find a splendid grove along the road—

poplars, sacred to Pallas—
a bubbling spring's inside and meadows run around it.
There lies my father's estate, his blossoming orchard too,

as far from town as a man's strong shout can carry.

The mythical gardens of the palace possessed a surreal lushness; they were located in the fenced orchard outside the courtyard, facing the tall gates:

Here luxuriant trees are always in their prime

pomegranates and pears, and apples glowing red,
succulent figs and olives swelling sleek and dark.
And the yield of all these trees will never flag or die,

neither in winter nor in summer, a harvest all year round.

This description is popular with writers on gardens, whether real or imaginary.

Poetic descriptions of Greek landscapes and flora are well known from ancient stories:

- Narcissus
- Daphne's transformation into a laurel
- oaks inhabited by dryads and streams with nymphs
- Persephone eating pomegranate seeds.

Nevertheless, it was only in the Hellenistic era that gardeners first wrote treatises on their work, called kepourika.

Homer's contemporaries were unfamiliar with such gardens, according to archaeologists, or with palaces such as Alcinous' (with bronze doors). The gardens of Greek myth were untended, orderly in style because order (themis) was assumed to be a natural principle. An example was the orchard of the Hesperides.

== Classical Greece ==
Archaeologists have identified no planted courtyards in palaces from Mycenean culture or in Greek houses from the Classical period. When a symposium on Roman gardens mentioned expected Greek precursors, one reviewer observed, "For all practical purposes there appear to have been no gardens of any sort in Greek city homes, beyond perhaps a few pots with plants." Apart from vegetable plots and orchards, there is some literary and archaeological evidence for public or semi-public gardens linked to sanctuaries (temenos). In fifth- and fourth-century Athens, some public places were planted with trees; as Plato suggested in his Laws, "The fountains of water, whether of rivers or springs, shall be ornamented with plantings and buildings for beauty".

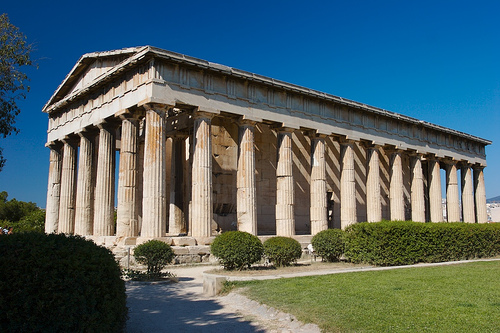
Temple of Hephaestus, Athens, replanted with myrtle and pomegranates in the 3rd-century planting pits

In 1936, the area around the Temple of Hephaestus at Athens was excavated down to bare rock. Rectangular planting pits were identified in this rock; these pits ran around three sides of the temple (but not the front) and were aligned with the temple columns. In the column bases were the shattered remains of flower pots in which layered stems had previously rooted. However, related coinage shows that the earliest of these plantings were not made until the third century BC. By that time, in mainland Greece and Ionia, the influence of Achaemenid Persia predominated in humanly-tended gardens. In the previous century, by contrast, Plutarch made the following observation about Alexander the Great: as a boy, he would ask Persian visitors to his father's court in Macedon about Persian roads and military organization—but never about the Hanging Gardens of Babylon. Herodotus, who probably visited Babylon in the mid-fifth century, does not mention these hanging gardens. Xenophon, under Achaemenid Persian influence, planted a grove when he returned to Athens. There is a myth, set in Macedon, of Silenus being found drunk by Midas; this myth can be dated to the Hellenistic period by its setting, a rose garden.

In Athens, the first private pleasure gardens appear in literary sources from the fourth century. Plato's Academy was situated in an ancient grove of plane trees that was sacred to an archaic hero, Akademos. Sacred groves were never actively planted, but had existed since the remote past and were regarded as sacred. These groves do not figure in the history of gardens, except for supporting contemplation or intellectual discourse. By contrast, the olive trees at the academy were reputedly planted as slips from the sacred olive tree at the Erechtheum. The grounds of the academy were bordered by walls for ritual reasons, as pleasure gardens would be for practical reasons. Within the academy's boundaries were multiple buildings: small temples, shrines, and tombs (including that of Akademos).

In 322 BC, Theophrastus—the "father of botany"—inherited Aristotle's garden, scholars, and library. Little is known about this garden except that it contained a walk and that Theophrastus lectured there; it may have been partly a botanical garden, with a scientific rather than recreational purpose. When he returned to Athens in 306 BCE, the philosopher Epicurus founded The Garden, a school named after his garden that was located between the Stoa and Plato's Academy, which served as the academy's meeting place. Little is known about Epicurus' garden, though in later cultural history it grew in reputation: about his garden Les Délices in Geneva, Voltaire said enthusiastically, "It is the palace of a philosopher with the gardens of Epicurus—it is a delicious retreat".

Gardens of Adonis, under Syrian influence, were simple plantings of herbal seedlings grown in saucers and pots. When these seedlings collapsed in the heat of summer, it was a signal for female adherents of Adonis to begin mourning rituals. These were not gardens in a classic sense.

== Hellenistic gardens ==
Harpalus, Alexander's successor at Babylon, grew some Greek plants in the royal palace and walks; but mainland Greece was not the originator of European gardens. The greatest Hellenistic garden was created by the Ptolemaic dynasty in Alexandria: a grand, walled, Edenic landscape, which included the Library of Alexandria, part of the Musaeum. Water-powered automata and water organs featured in Hellenistic gardens, toys devised by technicians such as Hero of Alexandria. (Significantly, Hero also designed machinery for theatres.) In late classical times, the peristyle form predominated in large private houses. A peristyle was a paved courtyard surrounded by a roofed colonnade; this courtyard eventually contained potted plants, a Persian and Egyptian innovation. The peristyle was used for palaces and gymnasia.

Roman decorative gardening first appeared after the Romans encountered garden traditions in the Hellenistic Near East.
