= Rhexenor =

Figures in Greek mythology

In Greek mythology, Rhexenor (Ancient Greek: Ῥηξήνωρ means "breaking armed ranks") may refer to the following figures:

- Rhexenor, a Phaeacian prince as son of King Nausithous and the brother of Alcinous who married his daughter Arete. Apollo killed Rhexenor in his hall while he was still a bridegroom and with no son.
- Rhexenor, the father of Chalciope, who was the second wife of King Aegeus of Athens.
- Rhexenor, one of Diomedes' followers who, returning from the Trojan War, were transformed into swan-like birds.
