= Garden of Alcinous =

Archetype of Greek gardens

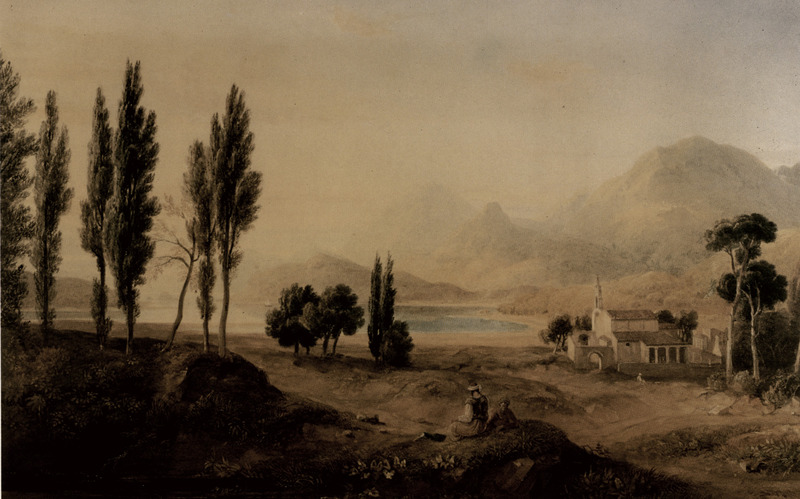
Garden of Alcinous Water Color by HW Williams

The Garden of Alcinous was one of the archetypes of Greek gardens that influenced the design of Mediterranean gardens through the end of Classical era. Pastoral poets, and later, Virgil and Horace, portrayed the garden as an ideal of rustic aesthetics and abundant fertility.

Scholars have compared Alcinous' garden and the island of Calypso; both are a locus amoenus with fresh springs and fruit trees. Some differences are noted; Calypso's garden is lush and endowed with a supernatural aesthetic beauty, while Alcinous' garden is simple and productive. Both have vineyards, but where Calypso's vines are heavy with unharvested grape clusters, Alcinous' vines are harvested by his men. Calypso's trees do not bear fruit while Alcinous' are domesticated. Calypso grows wild violets and herbs, Alcinous kitchen vegetables or useful culinary herbs. Alcinous' fountains provide water to the townspeople, while Calypso's flow freely along their natural course. Her garden gives pleasure only to the gods, and Alcinous tends to mortals.

Based on Homer's description of the Garden, known from The Odyssey, Rose Standish Nichols compared the gardens of the Homeric Age to kitchen gardens, "characterized by an extreme simplicity":

And without the courtyard, hard by the door, is a great garden of four ploughgates, and hedge runs round on either side. And there grow tall trees blossoming, pear trees and pomegranates, and apple trees with bright fruit, and sweet figs, and olives in their bloom. The fruit of these trees never perisheth, neither faileth, winter or summer, enduring through all the year. Evermore the west wind blowing brings some fruits to birth and ripens others. Pear upon pear waves old, and apple on apple, yea and cluster ripens upon cluster of the grape, and fig upon fig. There too hath he a fruitful vineyard planted...These were the splendid gifts of the gods in the palace of Alicnous.

And John Milton wrote in Paradise Lost:

Nearer he drew, and many a walk travers'd
Of stateliest cover, cedar, pine, or palm,
Then voluble and bold, now hid, nod seen
Among thick-woven arborets and flowers
Imborder'd on each bank, the hand of Eve;
Spot more delicious than those garden feign'd
Or of reviv'd Adonis, or renown'd
Alcinous, host of old Laertes' son"
