= Modinos =

Modinos may refer to:

- John Modinos, a Cypriot opera baritone
- Modinos v. Cyprus, a judgment of the European Court of Human Rights
