= Teresina Tua =

Italian musician (1866–1956)

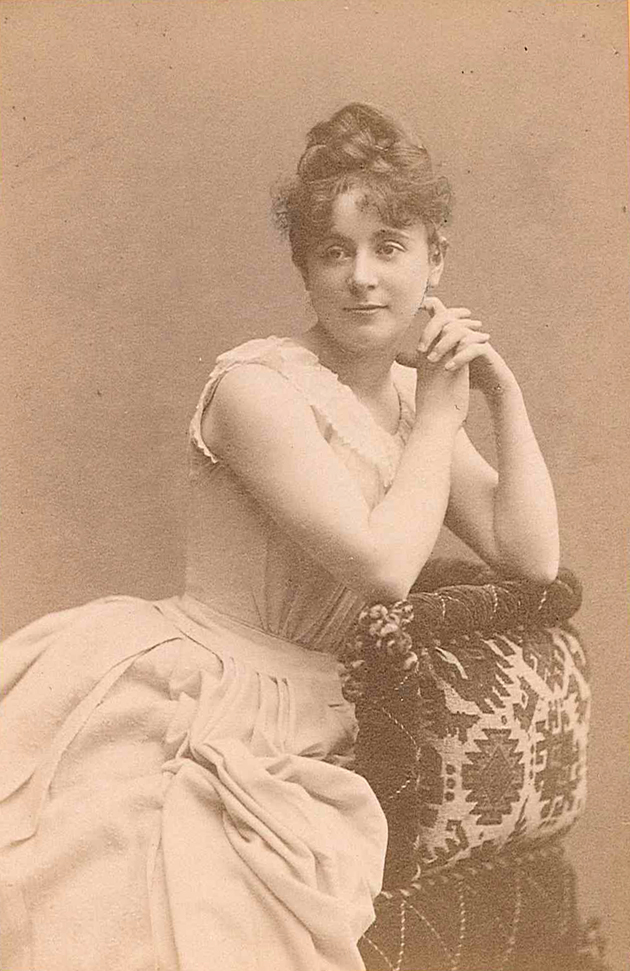
Teresina Tua (c. 1885)

Maddalena Maria Teresa Tua (23 April 1866 – 28 October 1956) was a prominent Italian violinist who demonstrated her musical talents from an early age.

== Biography ==
Born in Turin on 23 April 1866, Maddalena Maria Teresa Tua was the daughter of Antonio Tua, a mason and amateur violinist, and Marianna Rabino, a housewife who played the guitar. It was her father who initially taught her how to play but she made such rapid progress that after attending Bellini's opera La sonnambula, she began to play the tunes she had heard.

When only seven, she walked around northern Italy on a concert tour with her parents. She entered the Paris Conservatoire when she was 11, winning the Grand Prix for violin in 1880. She was widely acclaimed on her concert tours in the 1880s, filling the Opera House in Vienna in 1882 and performing in Germany, France, Spain and London. Her performances in the United States in 1887 were less successful and she soon returned to Europe where she married and settled in Rome. Touring Russia in 1895, she was accompanied by Rachmaninoff. In 1940, she joined a convent where she died in 1956.

== Bibliography ==
- Teresina Tua, l'angelo del violino, Luca Bianchini and Anna Trombetta, Daniela Piazza Publisher, 2006.
