= Odysseus at the Court of Alcinous =

1814–1816 painting by Francesco Hayez

- Medium: Oil on canvas painting
- Location: National Museum of Capodimonte

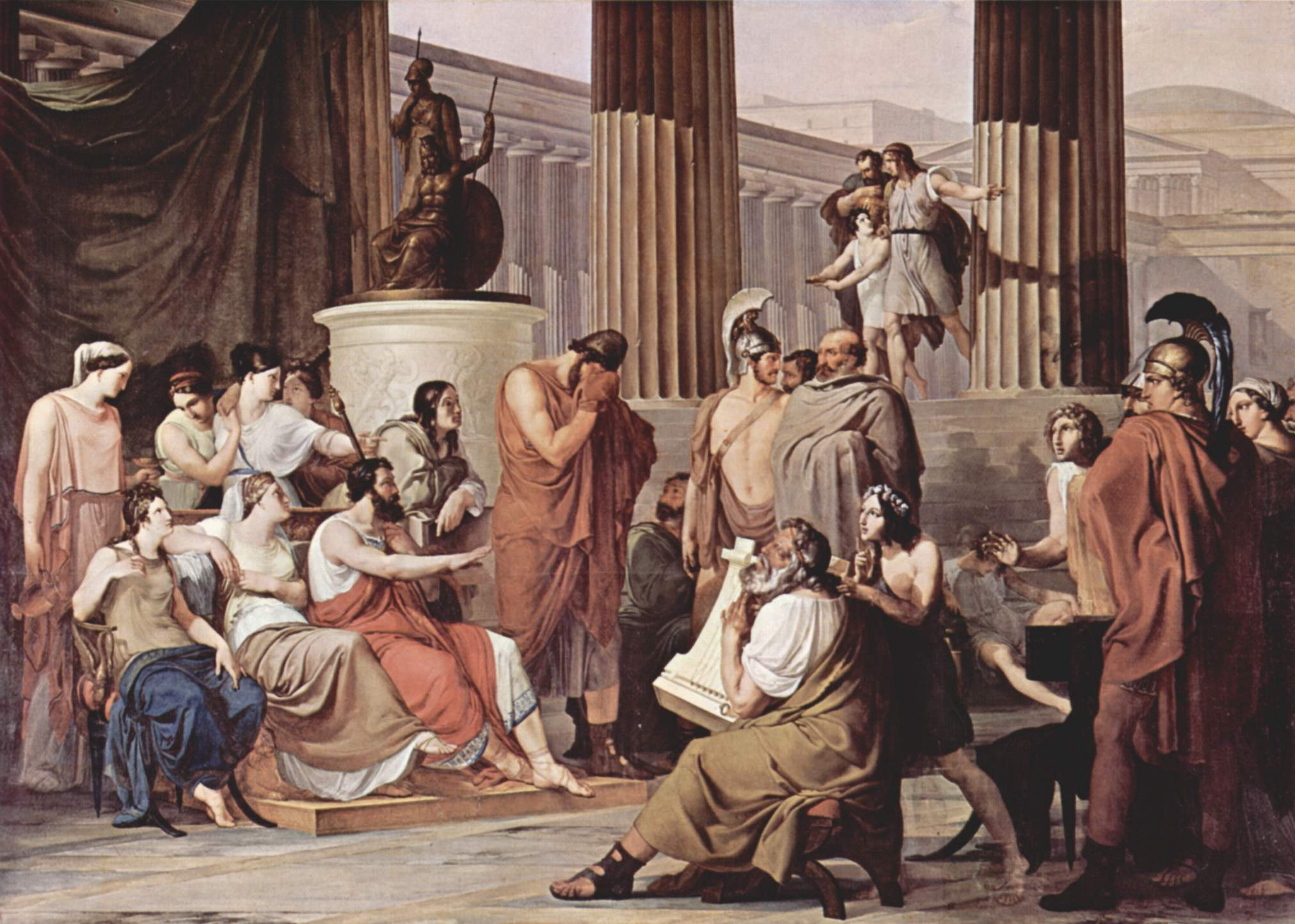
Odysseus at the Court of Alcinous (1814–1816) by Francesco Hayez

Odysseus at the Court of Alcinous (also known as Ulysses at the Court of Alcinous) is an oil-on-canvas painting by the Italian artist Francesco Hayez, painted between 1814 and 1816, and now in the National Museum of Capodimonte in Naples. It was commissioned for Gioacchino Murat by Naples' interior minister Giuseppe Zurlo, using dimensions, price and subject specified by Hayez's patron and protector Leopoldo Cicognara, president of the Accademia di Venezia.

== See also ==
Alcinous

Odyssey

== Preparatory Study ==
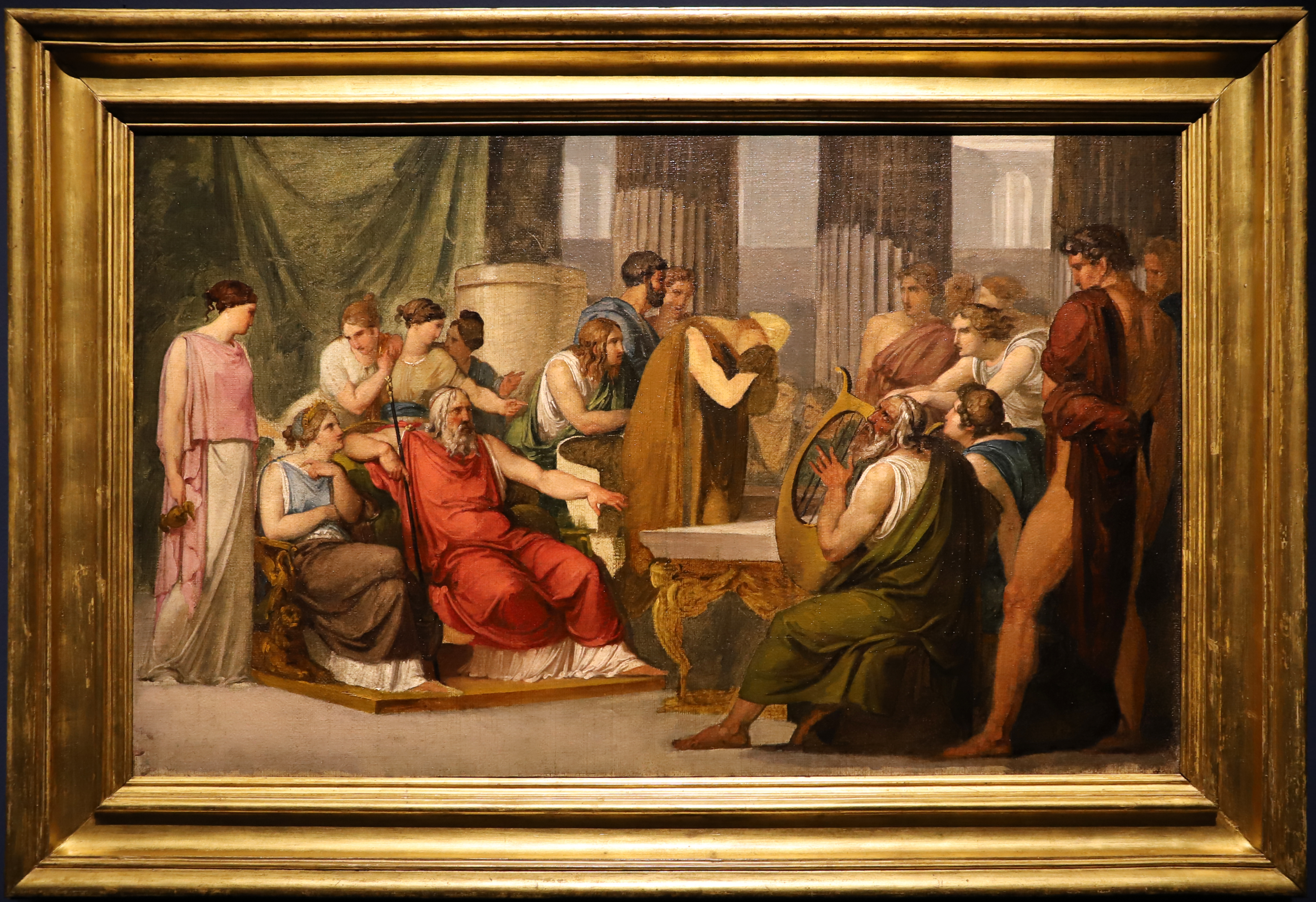
Preparatory draft of the painting, depicting the main elements of the final painting

This early draft of Odysseus in the Court of Alcinous retains the relative positions of multiple people that can be seen in the final painting, but with simpler or different appearances. Most notably, Odysseus, seen in the middle, with his exposed arm to his face.
