= Winding the Skein =

Painting by Frederic Leighton

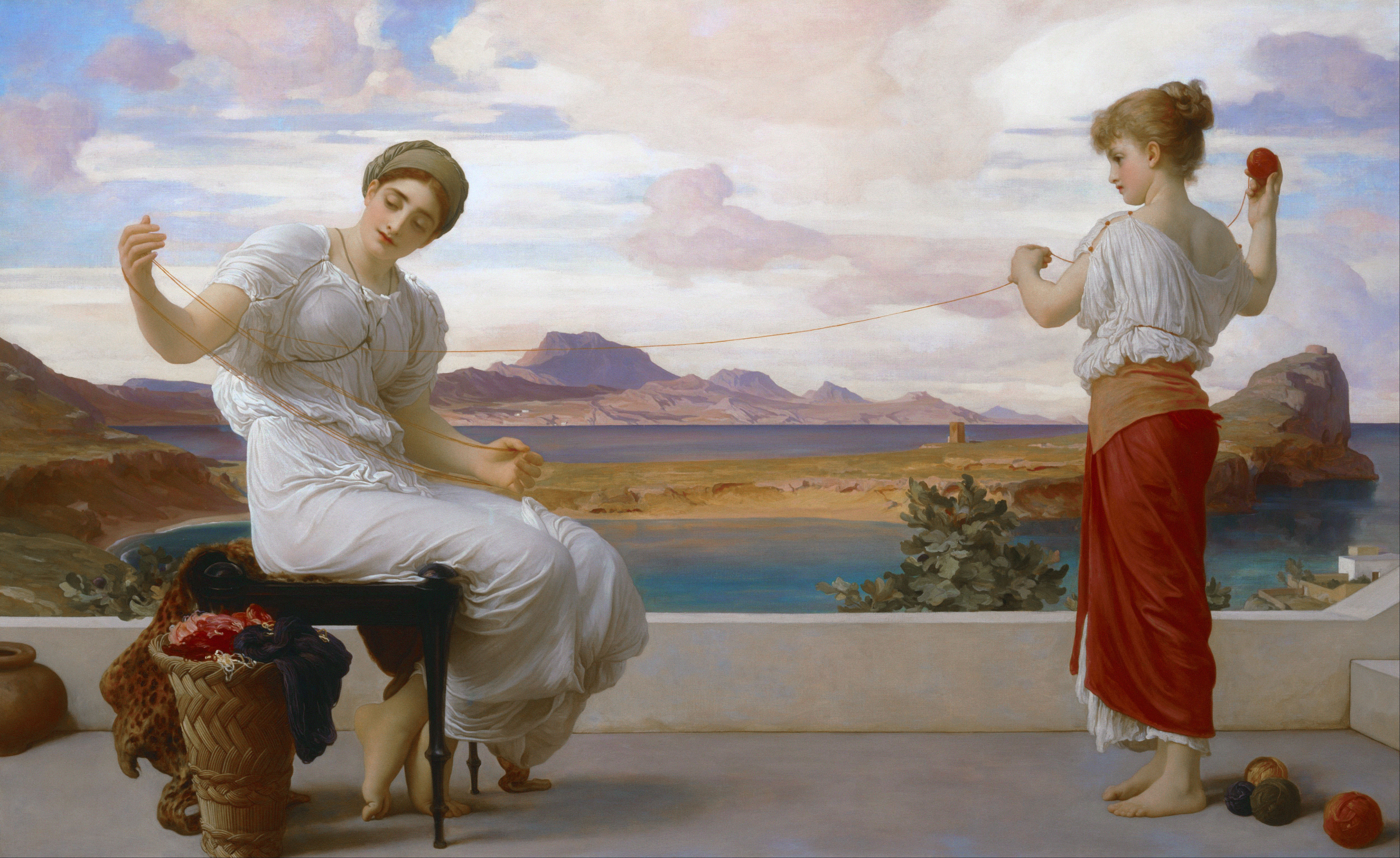
- Artist: Frederic Leighton
- Year: c. 1878
- Medium: Oil on canvas
- Dimensions: 100.3 cm × 161.3 cm (39.5 in × 63.5 in)
- Location: Art Gallery of New South Wales

Winding the Skein is an oil painting by Frederic Leighton, first exhibited in 1878.

== Description ==
Two canvases by Leighton were hung at the Royal Academy in 1878, the year of his enthronement as President: Winding the Skein and Nausicaa. Edgcumbe Staley gives the following description of the first picture:

Two Greek girls, light-complexioned, with fair hair, are engaged in a familiar occupation. The girls are busy on the flat roof or terrace of the house, which gives upon the distant sea and mountains. The atmosphere is brilliant and Levantine. The colours are beautifully contrasted, and the natural position of the girl sitting with her bare feet crossed under her chair and holding the skein of wool is admirable—she is in white drapery. The younger girl, in red and white, is winding the skein into a ball. The background is very beautiful—blue sea and distant purple hills.

== Analysis ==
In this picture, a simple theme is treated in a classic fashion—not dissimilar to that employed for the earlier Music Lesson. Ernest Rhys writes in praise of this perceived quality in Leighton:

In this we see two Greek maidens as naturally employed as we often see English girls in other surroundings. This idealization of a familiar occupation so that it is lifted out of a local and casual sphere, into the permanent sphere of classic art, is characteristic of the whole of Leighton's work. He, like Sir L. Alma-Tadema and Albert Moore, contrived also to preserve a certain modern contemporary feeling in the classic presentment of his themes. He was never archaic; so that the classic scenarium of his subjects, in his hands, appears as little antiquarian as a mediæval environment, shall we say, in the hands of Browning.

== See also ==
- Greeks in Syria

== Sources ==
- Ash, Russell (1995). Lord Leighton. London: Pavilion Books Limited. p. 55 [Plate 20].
- Jones, Stephen, et al. (1996). Frederic Leighton, 1830–1896. Royal Academy of Arts, London: Harry N. Abrams, Inc. pp. 52, 179, 185, 186, 206.
- Rhys, Ernest (1900). Frederic Lord Leighton: An Illustrated Record of his Life and Work. London: George Bell & Sons. pp. 37, 111, 126.
- Staley, Edgcumbe (1906). Lord Leighton of Stretton. London: The Walter Scott Publishing Co., Ltd.; New York: Charles Scribner's Sons. pp. 112, 217.
- Trumble, Angus (4 December 2005). "Winding the skein". The Victorian Web. Accessed 2 July 2022.
- "Winding the skein, circa 1878 by Lord Frederic Leighton". Art Gallery of NSW. Accessed 2 July 2022.
