= Clytoneus =

Two characters in Greek mythology

In Greek mythology, Clytoneus (Ancient Greek: Κλυτόνηος or Κλυτονήου, romanized: Klytónēos) or Clytonaeus may refer to two different individuals:

- Clytoneus or Clytius, son of Naubolus of Argos and father of the Argonaut Nauplius II, father of Palamedes.
- Clytoneus, a prince of Corcyra as son of King Alcinous and Arete. Thus, he was the brother of Nausicaa, Halius and Laodamas. Clytoneus and his brother are the winners of the foot-racing contest in honour of Odysseus.
