= Luca Bianchini and Anna Trombetta =

Italian musicians

Luca Bianchini (Sondrio, December 28, 1961) and his wife Anna Trombetta (Torino, September 11, 1964) are two Italian musicians, musicologists and music critics with degrees in musicology from the Cremona School of Palaeography and Musical Philology. The duo is known for their extensive studies on Mozart's musical life and work. Their Mozartian investigations have revealed some surprising aspects about the authorship of the composer's works and have caused quite a stir in musical circles, finding either support or rejection from their musicologist colleagues.

== Trajectory ==
Since the late 1980s, they have been revising musical works performed in world premieres and recorded on CD, such as Cimarosa's Armida Immaginaria for the Montpellier theater and for the Valle d'Itria International Festival, Semiramide in villa and Gli Zingari for the Taranto Paisiello Festival, or Pacini's Medea broadcast by RAI and discovered Simon Mayr's first Werther in operatic form, performed at the Rossini in Wildbad Festival, recorded on CD by the Bongiovanni label. In their research they have also been interested in musicians such as the violinist Teresina Tua, or composers such as Antonio Vivaldi, Giovanni Pacini, Nicola Antonio Zingarelli, Pietro Mascagni, for whom they have made revisions for their revivals.

Between 2016 and 2018, they recorded 24 episodes on Vatican Radio about Mozart. In 2022 they were awarded the Traetta Prize "in recognition of their passion in musicological research with important contributions in the redefinition of the historiography of 18th century music".

== Mozartian investigations ==
The couple have published a series of books resulting from their musicological, paleological and forensic research, raising doubts about the authorship of some of Mozart's compositions. Through investigation of the style of the compositions, the chemical analysis of the inks used in the scores and the dating of the manufacture of the paper they have been able to verify incorrect dates, in some cases they have been able to determine new attributions. Their research has been presented at various conferences and their books have been studied as part of several university courses.

== Discografía ==
Much of the revisions made by Bianchini and Trombetta have been recorded on CD:

- Medea by Giovanni Pacini, directed by Richard Bonynge, (Arkadia), 1993.
- Le Tre ore dell'agonia by Nicola Antonio Zingarelli, first modern performance, (Agorà), 1995.
- Ouvertures by Johann Simon Mayr, first modern performance, directed by Donato Renzetti, (Fonit Cetra), 1995.
- Cantatas by Johann Simon Mayr, performed by Simone Alaimo (Agorà), 1997.
- Armida Immaginaria by Domenico Cimarosa first modern performance at Festival della Valle d'Itria, (Dynamic), 1997.
- Verter by Johann Simon Mayr, first modern performance at Festival Rossini in Wildbad, (Bongiovanni), 2001.
- In Filanda by Pietro Mascagni first modern performance at Napoli Teatro Mercadante, (Bongiovanni), 2005.
- Zingari in Fiera by Giovanni Paisiello, first modern performance at Taranto Paisiello Festival, (Bongiovanni), 2008.
- Concerti per pianoforte e orchestra by Johann Simon Mayr, first modern performance, directed by Piero Barbareschi, (Tactus Records), 2013.
- Semiramide in villa by Giovanni Paisiello, first modern performance at Taranto Paisiello Festival, (Bongiovanni), 2004.

== Bibliography ==
- Goethe, Mozart e Mayr fratelli illuminati, 2001.
- Teresina Tua L'angelo del violino, 2006.
- Mozart the Fall of the Gods, 2 vol., 2016.
- Mozart, Il flauto magico, 2018.
- Mozart, La costruzione di un genio, 2019.
- Mozart in Italia editorial Youcanprint, 2021.
