= Jenny Drivala =

Greek soprano singer (born 1957)

- Τζένη Δριβάλα
- Born: 1957 (age 68–69); Kalamata, Greece
- Occupation: Soprano
- Years active: 1983–present
- Style: Opera

Jenny Drivala (Greek: Τζένη Δριβάλα; born 1957 in Kalamata, Greece) is a Greek soprano singer.

== History ==
Drivala studied Byzantine literature at the University of Athens, classical ballet (Morianova School), acting at the National Theatre School, piano (under Aikis Pandzari and G. Arvanitaki) and singing (under Eirini Lambrinidou and Mireille Flery) at the Athens Conservatoire. She completed her musical studies at the University of Bremen under John Modinos (1980).

She debuted in the title role of Donizetti's Lucia di Lammermoor at the Greek National Opera and at the Teatro Petruzzelli in Bari, Italy, in 1983. From 1982 to 2007, she interpreted leading roles in approximately twenty operas: La traviata, Rigoletto, and L'Assedio di Corinto as Greek National Opera premieres; Attila, Anna Bolena, Die Entführung aus dem Serail, and Die sieben Todsünden as Greek National Opera premieres; and Die Zauberflöte, La bohème, Pagliacci, Les contes d'Hoffmann, Die Fledermaus, and Faust (Athens Festival 1994), among others.

Since 2008, she has worked as a director. She has sung in the world premieres of The Return of Helen by Thanos Mikroutsikos (1993) and Antigone by Mikis Theodorakis (1999) at the Athens Concert Hall.

== Awards ==
- Gold Medal at the International Singing Competition of Toulouse (1977)
- Best Interpreter Award – Spoleto, Italy
- 1st prize at the Vincenzo Bellini International Competition, Italy (1983)
- UNESCO Maria Callas Prize (2016)
- Traetta Prize (2018)

== Recordings ==
- Songs I Love – London 1995 Sommrecords
- The Crucifixion – Byzantine Opera by Y. Boufides Athens 1996
- Christmas 2000 – Athens 2000
- Antigone – Opera by M.Theodorakis
- Brentano Lieder – Daphne – by R. Strauss
- Aria – Athens (2006) – Arias by Bellini, Verdi, Meyerbeer, Mozard
- Mozart: Mitridate, Re di Ponto (as Aspasia) – Teatro la Fenice (1999), Concuctor: Roderick Brydon"

== Cinema ==
- Malina by Werner Schroeter (1991)
- Poussières d'amour by Werner Schroeter (1996)
