= Traetta Prize =

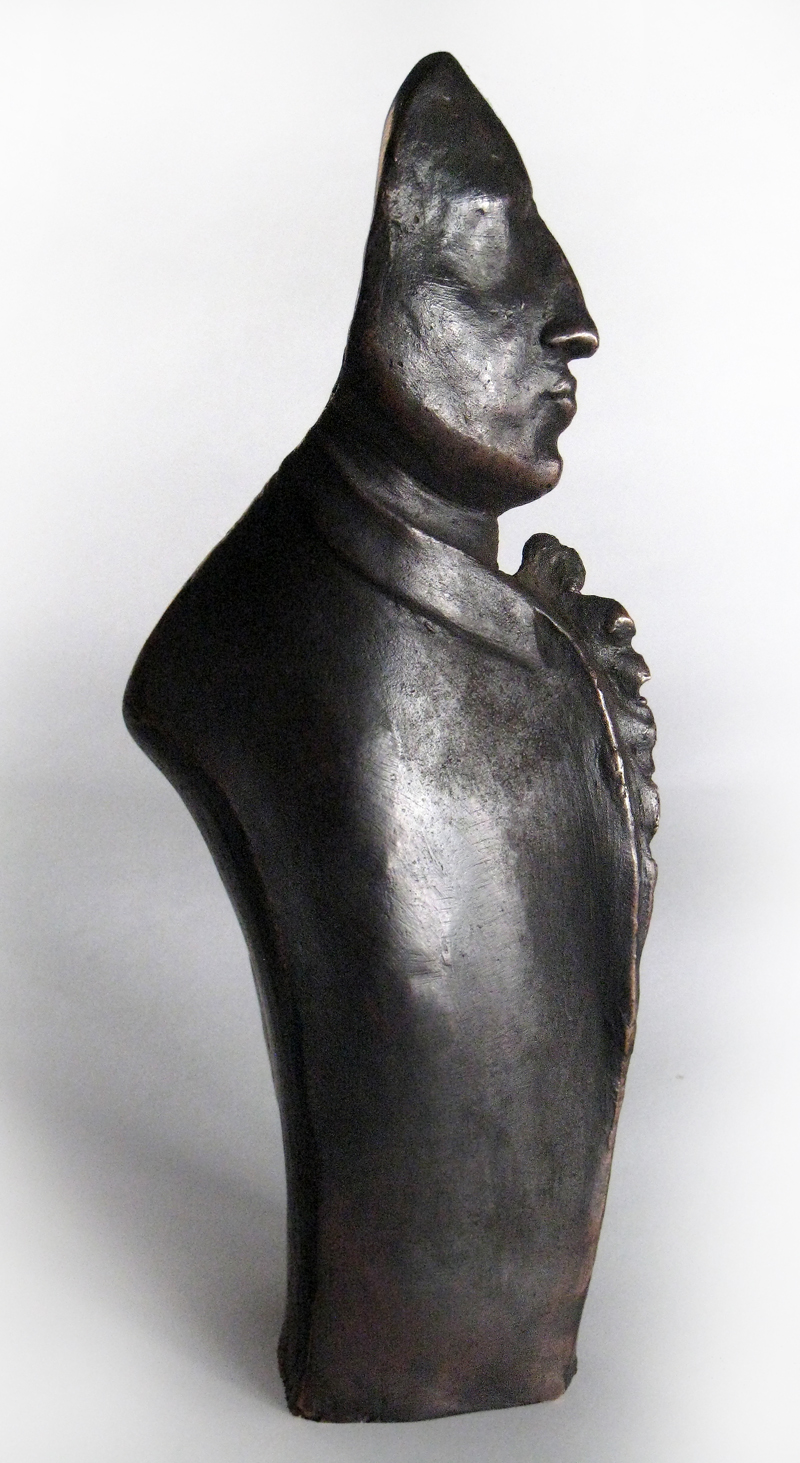
- Premio Traetta (Sculptor: Francisco Berdonces, 2015)
- Awarded for: Achievements in the rediscovery of the roots of European music
- Presented by: Traetta Society
- First award: 2009
- 2026 Winner: Les Talens Lyriques

The Traetta Prize (Italian: Premio Traetta) is an award assigned by the Traetta Society in recognition of achievements in the rediscovery of the roots of European music. The prize, conceived and promoted by the architect Gianfranco Spada, owes its name to the composer Tommaso Traetta (1727–1779) and is awarded each year during the Traetta Week, a festival dedicated to the composer that takes place during the eight days between the day of his birth to that of his death. (30 March – 6 April)

Traetta was one of the main composers of the Neapolitan School, who despite the huge success in life for his compositions has been unjustly unrecognised, along with other composers of the time, for his contribution to classical music by the music historiography of German origin, who founded the basics of classical music mostly on Germanic authors.

The objective of the Prize is to reward people who have committed themselves in expanding the knowledge of the musical production of the eighteenth century. The Prize borrows the name of Traetta as a symbol of a large list of composers unjustly forgotten such as Leonardo Vinci, Pasquale Anfossi, Antonio Sacchini, Nicola Vaccai, Leonardo Leo, Domenico Cimarosa or Vicente Martín y Soler among others.

== Winners ==
- 2026 – Les Talens Lyriques, France
- 2025 – Paul Atkin, England
- 2024 – Philippe Jaroussky, France
- 2023 – Benjamin David, Switzerland
- 2022 – Luca Bianchini and Anna Trombetta, Italy
- 2021 – Núria Rial, Spain
- 2020 – Diego Fasolis, Switzerland
- 2019 – Olga Peretyatko, Russia
- 2018 – Jenny Drivala, Greece
- 2017 – Mathias Augustyniak + Michael Amzalag, France
- 2016 – Werner Schroeter, Germany
- 2015 – Bejun Mehta, US
- 2014 – María Bayo, Spain
- 2013 – Christophe Rousset, France
- 2012 – Alan Curtis, US
- 2011 – René Jacobs, Belgium
- 2010 – Jolando Scarpa, Italy
- 2009 – Mario Moretti, Italy
