= Nausicaä of the Valley of the Wind =

Nausicaä of the Valley of the Wind may refer to:

- Nausicaä of the Valley of the Wind (manga), a manga series by Hayao Miyazaki
- Nausicaä of the Valley of the Wind (film), a 1984 anime film by Hayao Miyazaki, based on the manga series
- Nausicaä (Nausicaä of the Valley of the Wind), the main character of the manga series and anime film

== See also ==
- Nausicaa (disambiguation)
- List of Nausicaä of the Valley of the Wind characters
