= Nausicaa (Leighton) =

Painting by Frederic Leighton

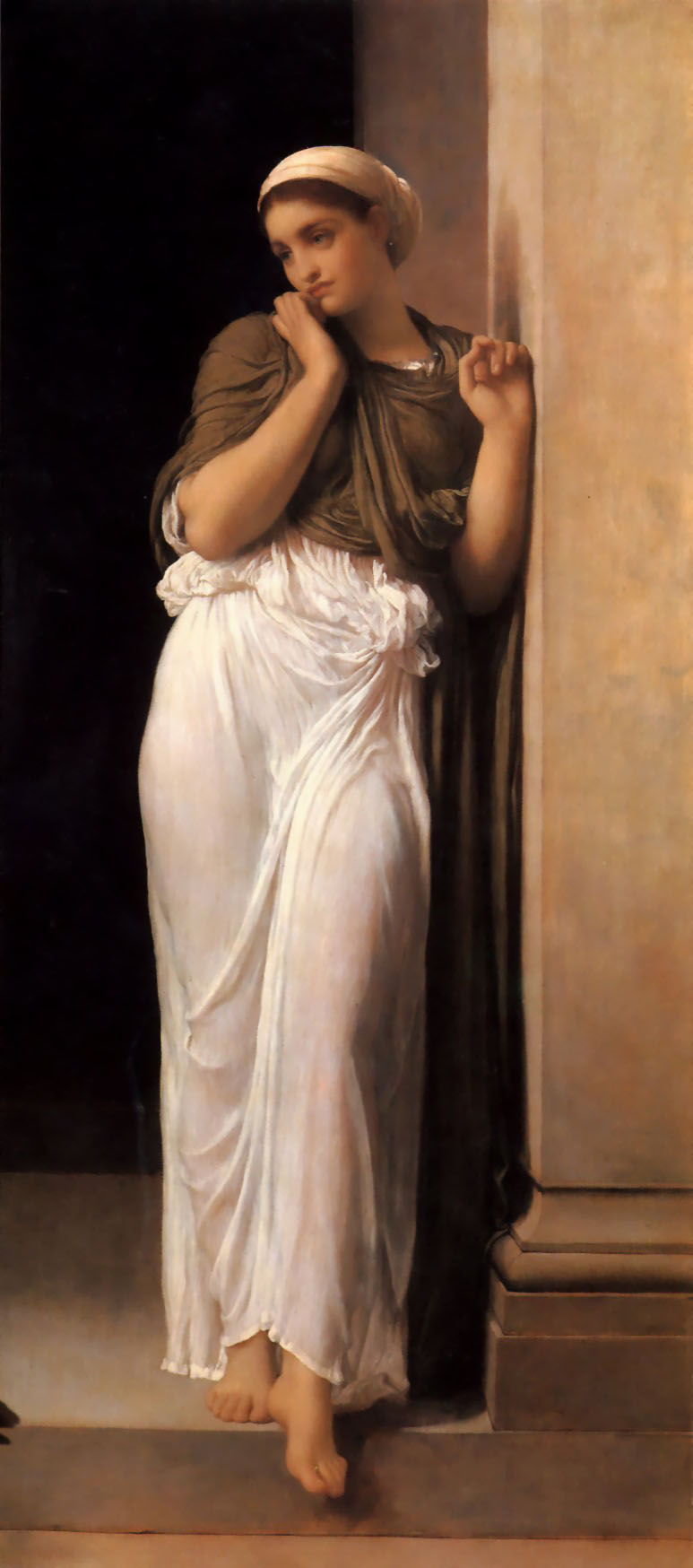
- Artist: Frederic Leighton
- Year: c. 1878
- Medium: Oil on canvas
- Dimensions: 144.7 cm × 66.9 cm (57.0 in × 26.3 in)

Nausicaa is an oil painting by Frederic Leighton, first exhibited in 1878.

== History ==
Nausicaa, a full-length girlish figure, in green and white draperies, standing in a doorway, was shown at the annual exhibition of the Royal Academy of Arts in 1878 alongside three other pictures by Leighton: Winding the Skein, Serafina (another single figure), and A Study.

== Description ==
Edgcumbe Staley describes the painting thus:

"Nausicaa" is one of Leighton's best single-figure pictures. She is painted full-length, leaning against a column of her father's palace at Ithaca and watching earnestly for the return of Odysseus. How often Leighton depicted that wistful, yearning look, gazing over the wide sea or peering into the distant perspective! Nausicaa is full of pathos and grace. She supports her burning cheek with her elegant right hand. Her feet are exquisitely modelled—one, slipping off the step, is instinct with life. Her draperies are green and creamy-white. She is a splendid figure of perfect contour.

== See also ==
- Academic art
- Nausicaa

== Sources ==
- Jones, Stephen, et al. (1996). Frederic Leighton, 1830–1896. Royal Academy of Arts, London: Harry N. Abrams, Inc. pp. 77, 185, 186, 188.
- Rhys, Ernest (1900). Frederic Lord Leighton: An Illustrated Record of his Life and Work. London: George Bell & Sons. pp. 37–38, 126.
- Staley, Edgcumbe (1906). Lord Leighton of Stretton. London: The Walter Scott Publishing Co., Ltd.; New York: Charles Scribner's Sons. pp. 113, 217, 220, 221.
