= John Modinos =

Greek Cypriot baritone (1927–2011)

- Born: 26 May 1927; Omodos, Cyprus
- Origin: New York City
- Died: 11 January 2011 (aged 83) Athens, Greece
- Genre: Opera
- Occupation: Musician
- Instrument: Singing

John Modinos (26 May 1927 – 11 January 2011) was a Greek Cypriot opera baritone.

== Life and career ==
John Modenos was born on 26 May 1927 in Omodos, a small village in Troodos Mountains, Cyprus. He had a career that spanned over four decades.

His career in music started in New York after winning "The American Theater Wing Concert Award" with which he made his recital debut in New York's Town Hall that had tremendous reviews. His operatic debut was also in New York in Verdi's La traviata with Beverly Sills. Another singing Award "The American Opera Auditions" brought him to Europe, performing Figaro in Rossini's The Barber of Seville in Milan and Scarpia in Puccini's Tosca in Florence with James King as Cavaradosi. The same summer, he performed at the Athens Festival with Teresa Stratas, the world premiere of the opera "Nausicaa". Both these events opened the way for world acclamation.

With Luciano Pavarotti, he sung Rigoletto many times, a role that furthered Modinos' worldwide fame for his interpretation and exceptional singing. He has performed the role 223 times all over the world.

- with Plácido Domingo Traviata, Andrea Chenier etc.
- with Montserrat Caballe Un ballo in maschera, Der Rosenkavalier
- with Magda Olivero Adriana Lecouvreur
- with Cesare Siepi Faust, Don Carlos etc.
- with James McCracken Aida, Trovatore, Otello.
- with Vladimir Atlantov Pagliacci
- with Martina Arroyo Aida, Trovatore
- with Ghena Dimitrova Nabucco

and with numerous other top singers and conductors; Aragal, Jess Thomas, Schwarzkopf, Seefeld, Troyanos, Moscona, Talvera, Gremdl, Edelman, Nikolaidi, Della Casa, Hilde Gueden, Zylis - Gara, Regine Crespin, Jenny Drivala etc.

Modinos died on 11 January 2011, in Athens, Greece. The cause of death was heart failure.
