= Alcinous =

Greek mythical character

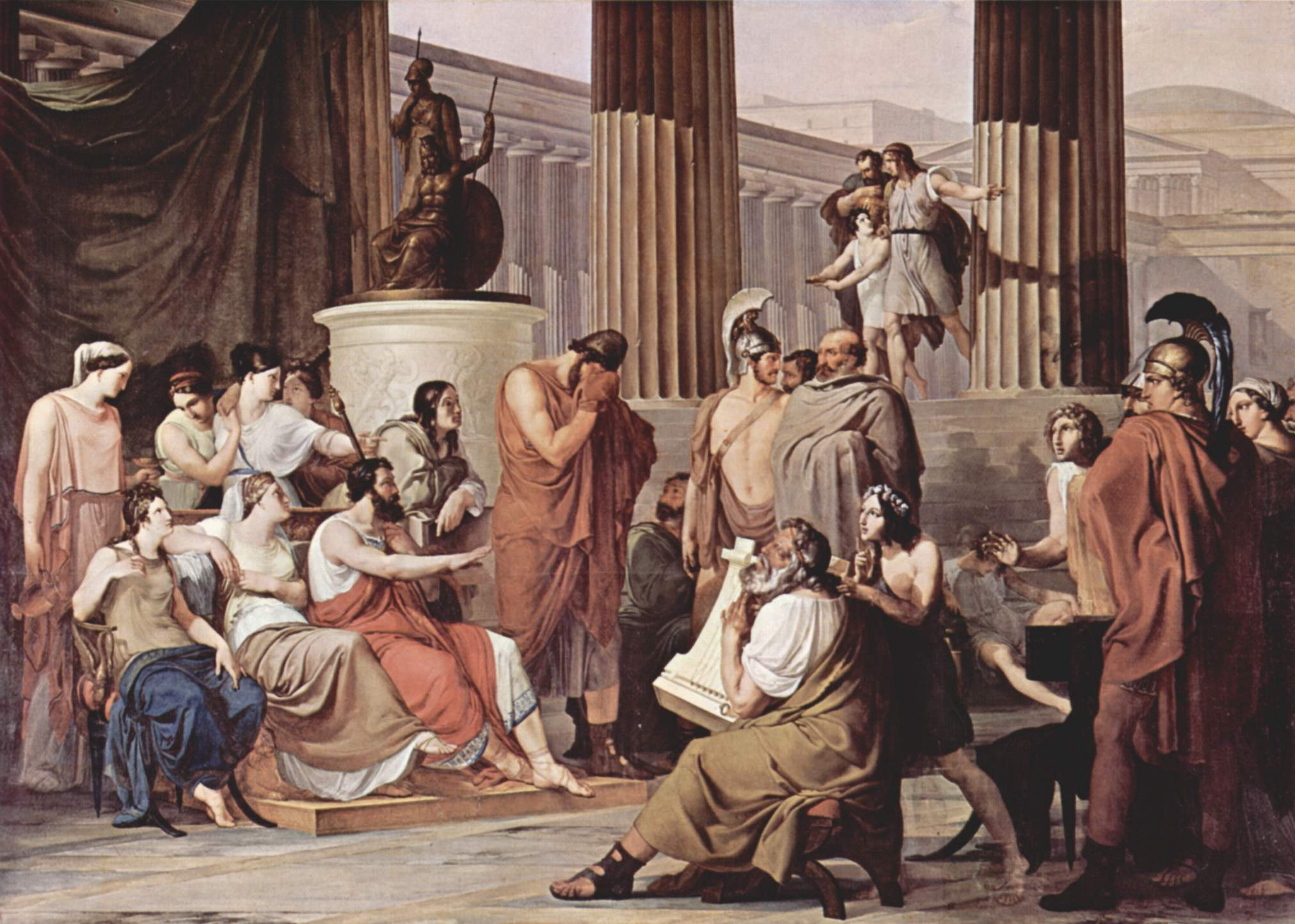
Odysseus at the Court of Alcinous by Francesco Hayez. The blind minstrel Demodocus is playing the harp.

In Greek mythology, Alcinous (also Alcinoüs; /ælˈsɪnəʊəs/; Ancient Greek: Ἀλκίνοος Alkínoos lit. 'mighty mind') was a son of Nausithous and brother of Rhexenor. After the latter's death, he married his brother's daughter Arete who bore him Nausicaa, Halius, Clytoneus and Laodamas. In some accounts, Alcinous' father was Phaeax, son of Poseidon and Corcyra, and brother of Locrus.

== Mythology ==
=== Argonautica ===
In the myth of Jason and the Argonauts, Alcinous is represented as living with his wife Arete on Drépané island. The Argonauts, on their return from Colchis, came to his island, and were hospitably received. When the Colchians, in their pursuit of the Argonauts, likewise arrived in Drépané, and demanded that Jason's lover Medea should be delivered up to them, Alcinous declared that if she was still a virgin she should be restored to them, but if she was already the wife of Jason, he would protect her and her husband against the Colchians. The Colchians were obliged, by the contrivance of Arete, to depart without their princess, and the Argonauts continued their voyage homeward, after they had received expensive presents from Alcinous.

=== Odyssey ===
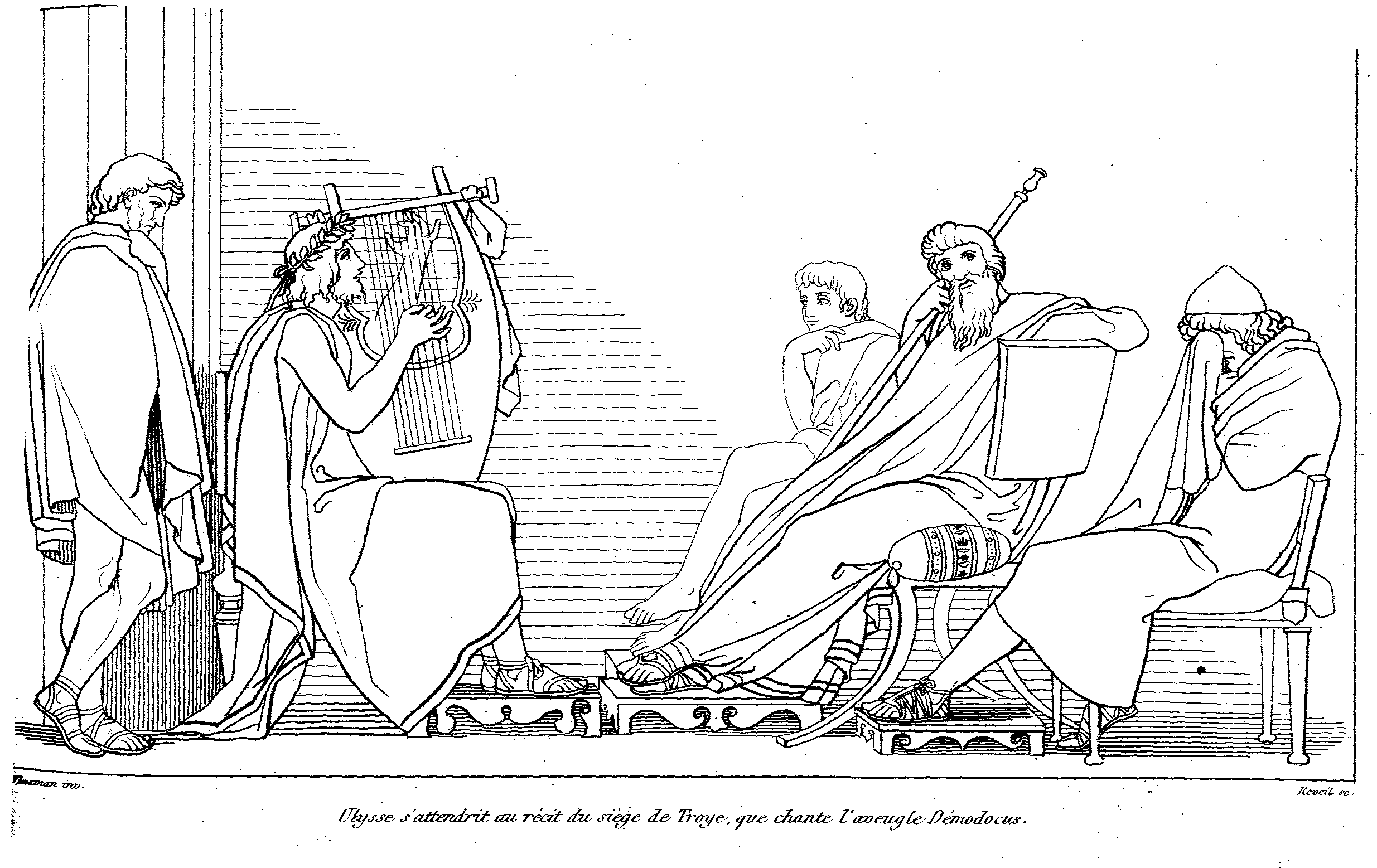
Demodocos singing to Odysseus and Alcinous, illustration by John Flaxman (1810)

According to Homer, Alcinous is the happy ruler of the Phaiacians in the island of Scheria, who has by Arete five sons and one daughter, Nausicaa. The description of his palace and his dominions, the mode in which Odysseus is received, the entertainments given to him, and the stories he related to the king about his own wanderings, occupy a considerable portion of Homer's Odyssey (from book vi. to xiii.), and form one of its most charming parts. Alcinous has a squire, Pontonous, who serves wine during this feast.

=== Other accounts ===
In Conon's Narrations, when Phaiax who reigned on the island of Corcyra died, Alkinous and his brother Lokros, after quarreling agreed upon on the basis that Alcinous would be the king of the Phaeacians and Locrus would take the heirlooms and part of the ethnos to make a colony. The latter sailed to Italy where he married the Laurine, daughter of King Latinus of the Italians and for this reason, the Phaiakians claim the Lokrians in Italy as relatives.

== In popular media ==
Alcinous was portrayed by Jeroen Krabbé in the 1997 miniseries The Odyssey.

== See also ==
- 11428 Alcinoös, Jovian asteroid named after Alcinous
- Garden of Alcinous
