= Arete (mythology) =

Greek mythical character

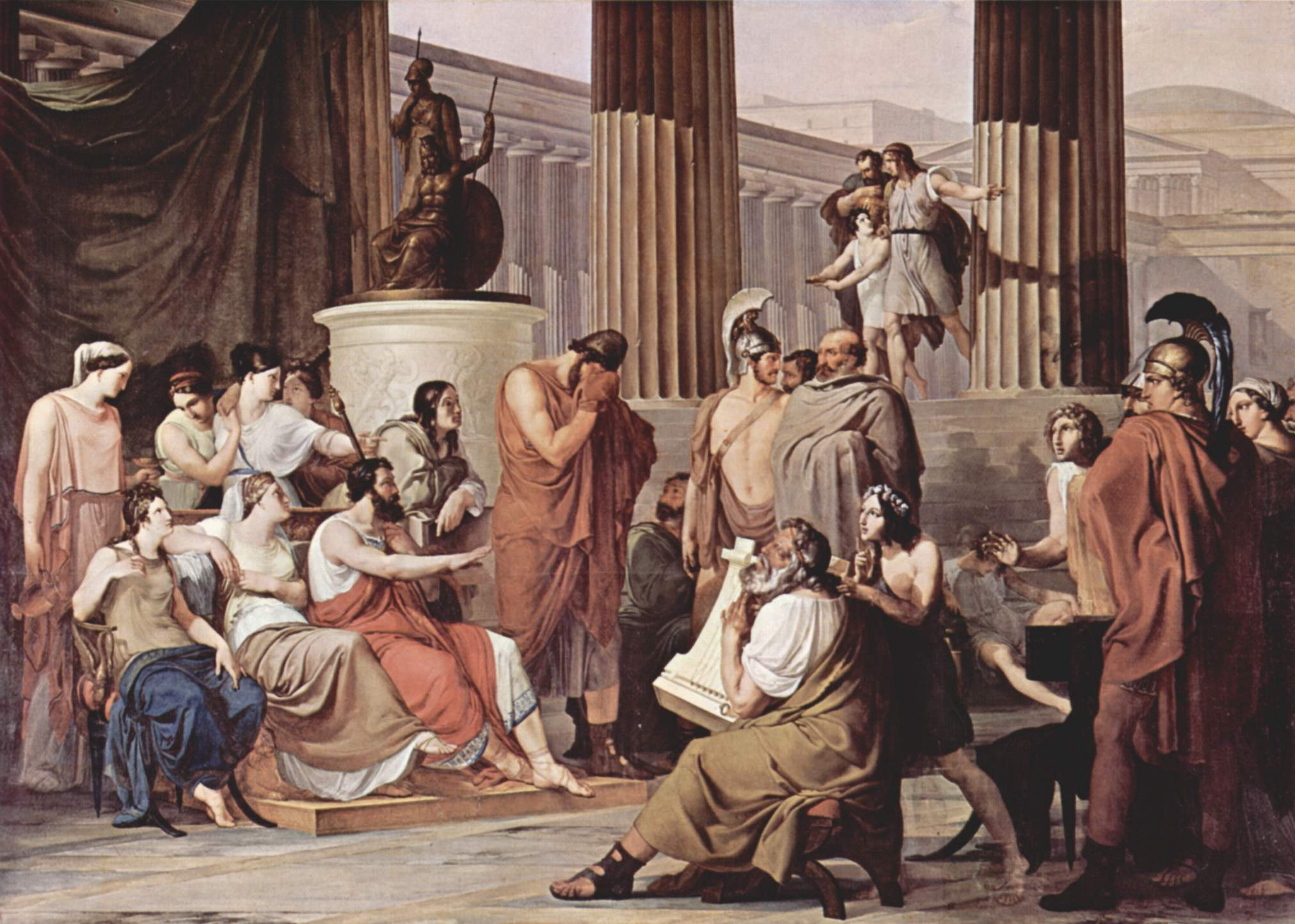
Francesco Hayez, Ulysses at the court of Alcinous, 1814–1815. Arete is depicted on the left, sitting between Nausicaa and Alcinous.

In Greek mythology, Queen Arete (/əˈriːtiː/; Ancient Greek: Ἀρήτη means "she who is prayed for") of Scheria was the wife of Alcinous and mother of Nausicaa and Laodamas.

== Biography ==
Arete was the daughter of Rhexenor. She was a descendant of Poseidon, who, making love to Periboea, begot Nausithous, who in turn had two sons, Rhexenor, her father and Alcinous, her uncle and later on, her husband. Her name appears to be associated with the Ionic noun ἀρητή, meaning "sacred", "cursed" or "prayed." Some sources claim that it means "righteous", while others connect it with Ares, the Greek god of war.

== Mythology ==
=== Argonautica ===
Arete was also depicted as an intelligent and generous hostess by Apollonius in Book 4 of the Argonautica, where he recounts the story of Jason and Medea.

When the Argonauts arrived at the island, Arete and her husband received them and Medea hospitably. The Colchians arrived soon after in pursuit of Medea and demanded to take her back to face punishment for the death of her father, Aeëtes. Medea appealed to Arete, and Arete in turn appealed to her husband to grant mercy to Medea. When Alcinous compromised with the declaration, "If she be yet a maid I decree that they carry her back to her father; but if she shares a husband's bed, I will not separate her from her lord; nor, if she bear a child beneath her breast, will I give it up to an enemy," Arete went to Jason and Medea in the night and told them what to do so that Medea's life would be spared. Through her efforts, the two were wed and the Colchians were forced to return to their homeland without Medea.

=== Odyssey ===
In the Odyssey, Arete appears as a noble and active superintendent of the household of her husband. When Odysseus arrived in Scheria, he appealed first to Arete for reception and protection, and she treated him hospitably. He did so on Nausicaa and Athena's instructions, the goddess having described Arete thus:

Her Alcinous made his wife, and honored her as no other woman on earth is honored, of all those who in these days direct their households in subjection to their husbands; so heartily is she honored, and has ever been, by her children and by Alcinous himself and by the people, who look upon her as upon a goddess, and greet her as she goes through the city. For she of herself is no wise lacking in good understanding, and for the women to whom she has good will she makes an end of strife even among their husbands.

== General and cited references ==
- Apollonius Rhodius, Argonautica translated by Robert Cooper Seaton (1853–1915), R. C. Loeb Classical Library Volume 001. London, William Heinemann Ltd, 1912. Online version at the Topos Text Project.
- Apollonius Rhodius, Argonautica. George W. Mooney. London. Longmans, Green. 1912. Greek text available at the Perseus Digital Library.
- Homer, The Odyssey with an English Translation by A.T. Murray, PH.D. in two volumes. Cambridge, MA., Harvard University Press; London, William Heinemann, Ltd. 1919. ISBN 978-0674995611. Online version at the Perseus Digital Library. Greek text available from the same website.
