= Scheria =

Region in Greek mythology

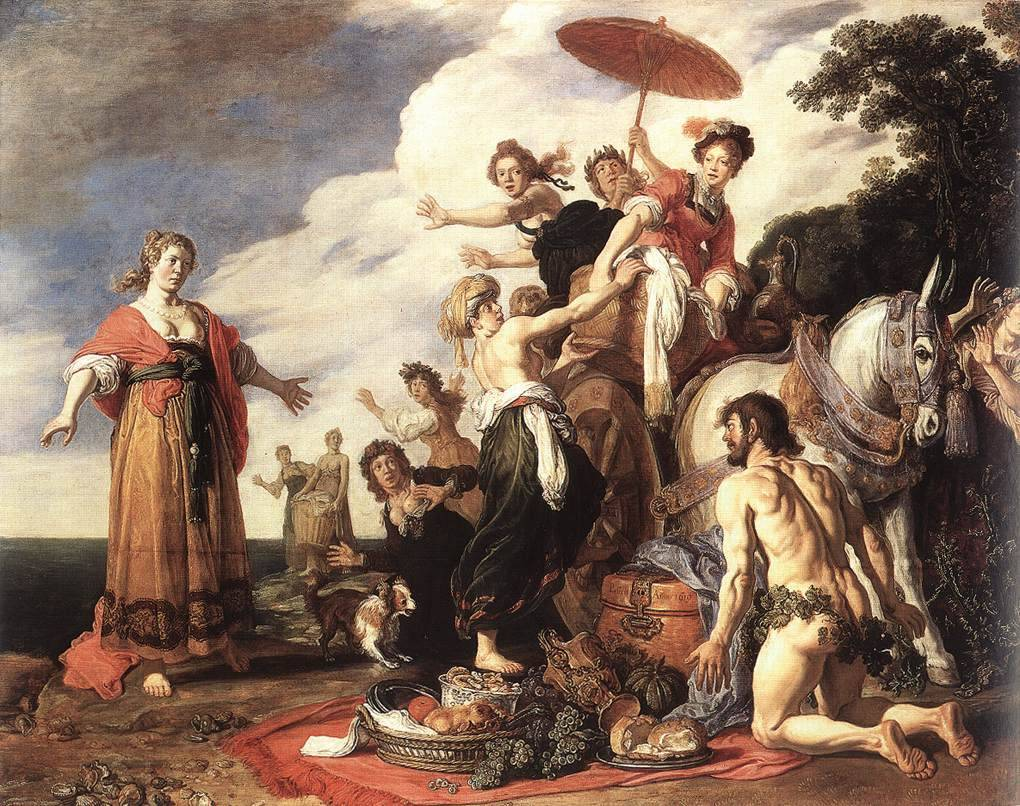
Pieter Lastman's Odysseus and Nausicaa, oil on panel, 1619; Alte Pinakothek, Munich.

Scheria or Scherie (/ˈskɪəriə/; Ancient Greek: Σχερία, romanized: Skhería or Σχερίη), also known as Phaeacia (/fiːˈeɪʃə/; Ancient Greek: Φαιακία, romanized: Phaiakía), is a place in Greek mythology, first mentioned in Homer's Odyssey as the home of the Phaeacians (most prominently Nausicaa and her father King Alcinous) and the last destination of Odysseus in his 10-year journey before returning home to Ithaca. It is one of the earliest descriptions of a utopia.

== From Ogygia to Scheria (Odysseus) ==
Before leaving Ogygia, Odysseus builds a raft and sails eastwards, instructed by Calypso to navigate using the stars as a celestial reference point. On the eighteenth day appear the shadowy mountains of the land of the Phaeacians, that looked like a shield in the misty deep. Poseidon spots his raft and seeking vengeance for his son Polyphemus who was blinded by Odysseus, produces a storm that torments Odysseus. After three days of struggle with the waves, he is finally washed up on Scheria.

== Odysseus meets Nausicaa ==
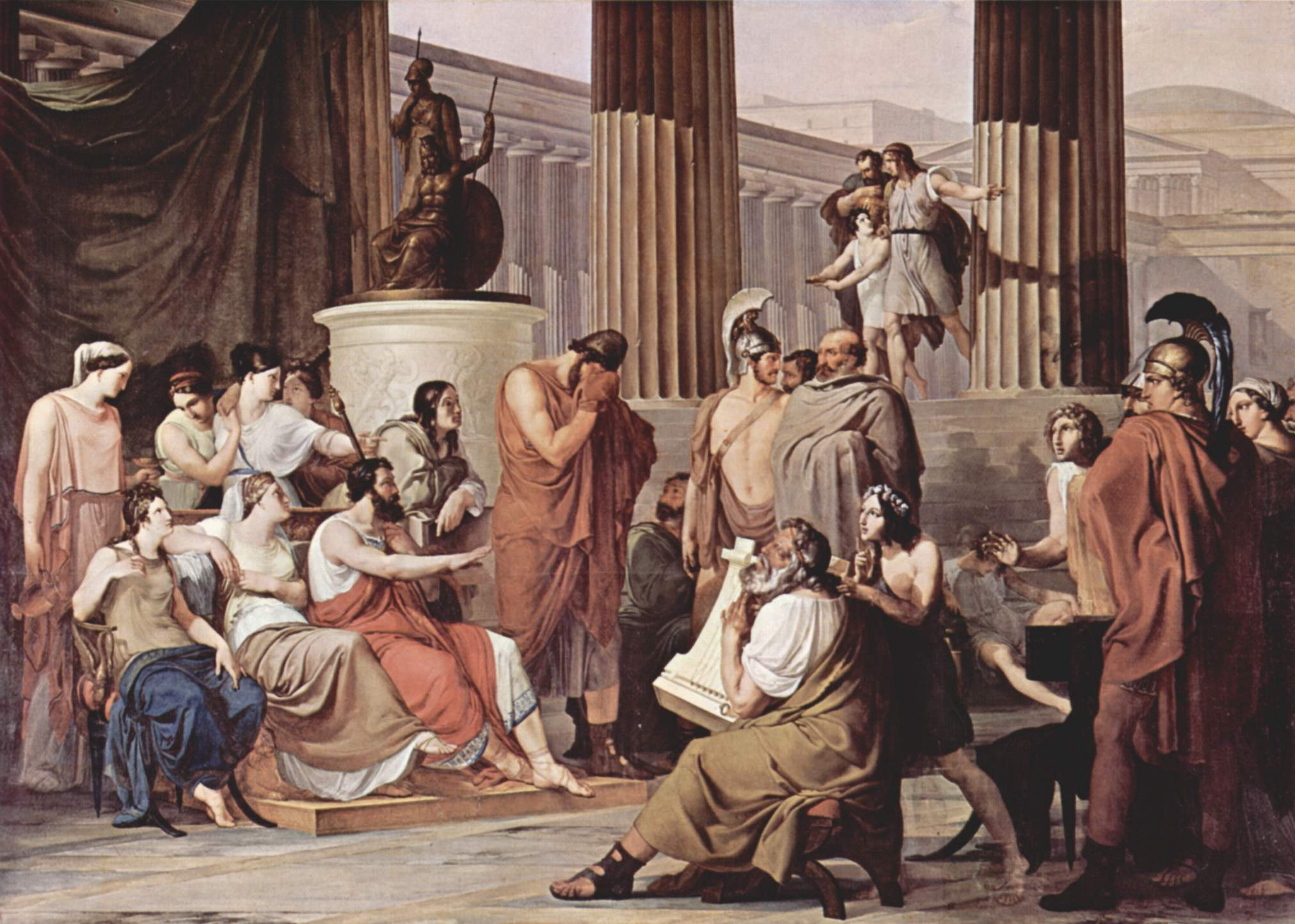
Francesco Hayez: Odysseus at the court of Alcinous (oil on canvas, c. 1815; Galleria Nazionale di Capodimonte, Naples)

Meanwhile, the goddess Athena sneaks into the palace, disguised as a sea-captain's daughter, and instructs princess Nausicaa (the daughter of King Alcinous) in her sleep to go to the seashore and wash her clothes. The next morning, Nausicaa and her maids go to the seashore, and after washing the clothes, start to play a game on the beach, with laughs, giggles and shouts. Odysseus, sleeping nearby exhausted from his adventure, is awakened by the shouts. He covers his nakedness with thick leaves and goes to ask for help from the group. Upon seeing the unkempt Odysseus in this state, the maids run away, but, Nausicaa, encouraged by Athena, stands her ground and talks to him. To excuse the maids, she admits that the Phaeacians are "the farthermost of men, and no other mortals are conversant with them", so they run away since they have never seen a stranger before. Nausicaa, being hospitable, provides clothes, food and drink to Odysseus, and then directs him to the palace of King Alcinous.

== The palace of King Alcinous ==
Following Nausicaa's instructions, Odysseus sought to enter the palace of King Alcinous and plead for mercy from the queen, Arete, so he could make his way home. On his way to the palace, Odysseus meets Athena disguised as a local girl. In her disguised state, Athena advises him about how to enter the palace. Athena, knowing that the Phaeacians were hostile towards men from the outlands, cloaked Odysseus in a mist that hid him from the Phaeacians' gaze. Under Athena's protection, Odysseus passes through all of the protection systems of the palace and enters the chamber of King Alcinous. Odysseus throws his arms around the queen's legs and supplicates her. Naturally, Alcinous and his court are surprised to see a stranger walking into their secured palace. It is only after Echeneus, a Phaeacian elder, urges King Alcinous to welcome the stranger that they offer Odysseus hospitality.

The front doors of the palace are flanked with two dogs made of silver and gold, constructed by Hephaestus. The walls of the palace are made of bronze that "shines like the sun", with gates made of gold. Within the walls, there is a magnificent garden with apple, pear, and pomegranate trees that grow year-round. The palace is even equipped with a lighting system consisting of golden statues of young men bearing torches. After Odysseus tells Alcinous and his court the story of his adventures after the Trojan War, the Phaeacians take him to Ithaca on one of their ships.

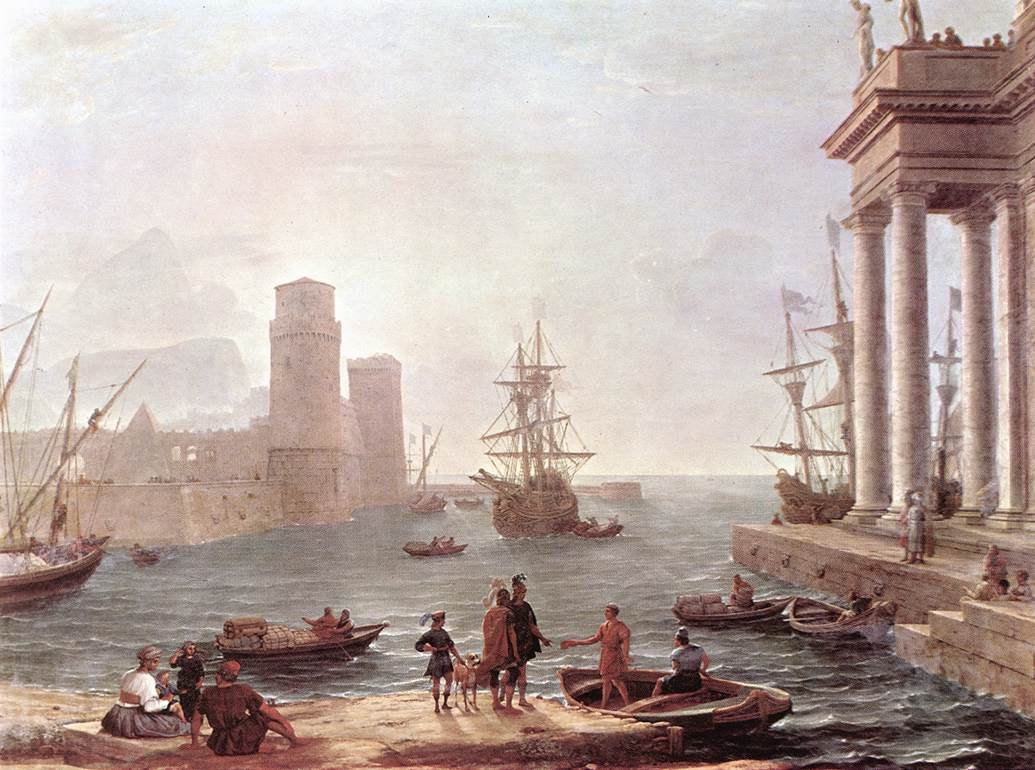
Claude Lorrain: Port Scene with the Departure of Odysseus from the Land of the Phaeacians (oil on canvas, 1646; Louvre, Paris)

== Pheacian games ==
In Odyssey 8, Odysseus lands on the island of the Phaeacians. During Odysseus' time there, the Phaeacians stage a series of athletic contests for Odysseus so that he could spread stories about the Phaeacians' athletic prowess. First, the Phaeacians competed in a foot race. Following the foot race, the Phaeacians battled each other in a fierce wrestling competition. After wrestling, the Phaeacians held jumping and boxing contests. The fifth and final event was the discus throw. After the discus competition, Odysseus is invited to show his athletic skills, but he declines the offer. After declining the offer, one Phaeacian, Euryalos, joked that Odysseus did not have the skills to compete in an athletic competition. This infuriated Odysseus. The angered Odysseus then grabbed a discus much larger and heavier than the ones used by the Phaeacians, and he swung back and released the discus. The discus landed well clear of the Phaeacians' earlier marks. Odysseus then challenged the Phaeacians to other athletic competitions, which they declined.

== The Phaeacian ships ==
The Phaeacians possessed remarkable ships. They were quite different from the penteconters, the ships used during the Trojan War, and they were steered by thought. King Alcinous says that Phaeacians carried Rhadamanthus to Euboea, "which is the furthest of any place" and came back on the same day. He also explains to Odysseus what sort of information the Phaeacian ships require in order to take him home to Ithaca.

Tell me also your country, nation, and city, that our ships may shape their purpose accordingly and take you there. For the Phaeacians have no pilots; their vessels have no rudders as those of other nations have, but the ships themselves understand what it is that we are thinking about and want; they know all the cities and countries in the whole world, and can traverse the sea just as well even when it is covered with mist and cloud, so that there is no danger of being wrecked or coming to any harm.

Homer describes the Phaeacian ships as fast as a falcon and gives a vivid description of the ship's departure.

The ship bounded forward on her way as a four in hand chariot flies over the course when the horses feel the whip. Her prow curvetted as it were the neck of a stallion, and a great wave of dark blue water seethed in her wake. She held steadily on her course, and even a falcon, swiftest of all birds, could not have kept pace with her.

== Geographical location of Scheria ==
Many ancient and modern interpreters favor identification of Scheria with the island of Corfu, which is within 110 km (68 miles) of Ithaca. Thucydides, in his Peloponnesian War, identifies Scheria as Corfu or, with its ancient name, Corcyra. In I.25.4, he records the Corinthians' resentment of the Corcyraeans, who "could not repress a pride in the high naval position of an island whose nautical renown dated from the days of its old inhabitants, the Phaeacians." Locals on Corfu had long claimed this, based on the rock off the west coast of the island, which is supposedly the ship that carried Odysseus back to Ithaca, but was turned to stone by Poseidon, to punish the Phaeacians for helping his enemy,

[…] with one blow from the flat of his hand turned her [the ship] into stone and rooted her to the sea bottom.

The Phaeacians did not participate in the Trojan War. The Greek name Φαίακες is derived from phaiós (φαιός “gray”). The Phaeacians in the Odyssey did not know Odysseus (although they knew of him, as evidenced by the tales of Demodocus), so they called him a "stranger". Odysseus however was the king of the majority of the Ionian Islands, not only of Ithaca, but also "of Cephallenia, Neritum, Crocylea, Aegilips, Same and Zacynthus" so if Scheria was Corfu, it would be surprising that the citizens of one of the Ionian Islands did not know Odysseus. Furthermore, when Odysseus reveals his identity, he says to the nobles: "[…] if I outlive this time of sorrow, I may be counted as your friend, though I live so far away from all of you" indicating that Scheria was far away from Ithaca.

Some suggest that many characteristics of the Phaeacians, including their seafaring and relaxed lifestyle, are suggestive of Minoan Crete. Aside from the seafaring prowess, the palace walls that 'shone like the Sun' are read to be covered not by bronze but orichalcum. The latter similarities make Scheria also suggestive of Plato's account of Atlantis. Since ancient times, some scholars who examined the work and geography of Homer, have suggested that Scheria was located in the Atlantic Ocean, among them were Strabo and Plutarch.

=== Geographical account by Strabo ===
Approximately eight centuries after Homer, the geographer Strabo criticized Polybius on the geography of the Odyssey. Strabo proposed that Scheria and Ogygia were located in the middle of the Atlantic Ocean.

At another instance he [Polybius] suppresses statements. For Homer says also "Now after the ship had left the river-stream of Oceanus" and "In the island of Ogygia, where is the navel of the sea," where the daughter of Atlas lives; and again, regarding the Phaeacians, "Far apart we live in the wash of the waves, the farthermost of men, and no other mortals are conversant with us." All these [incidents] clearly suggest that he [Homer] composed them to take place in the Atlantic Ocean.

== See also ==
- Copanello
