= Nausicaa =

Character from Greek mythology

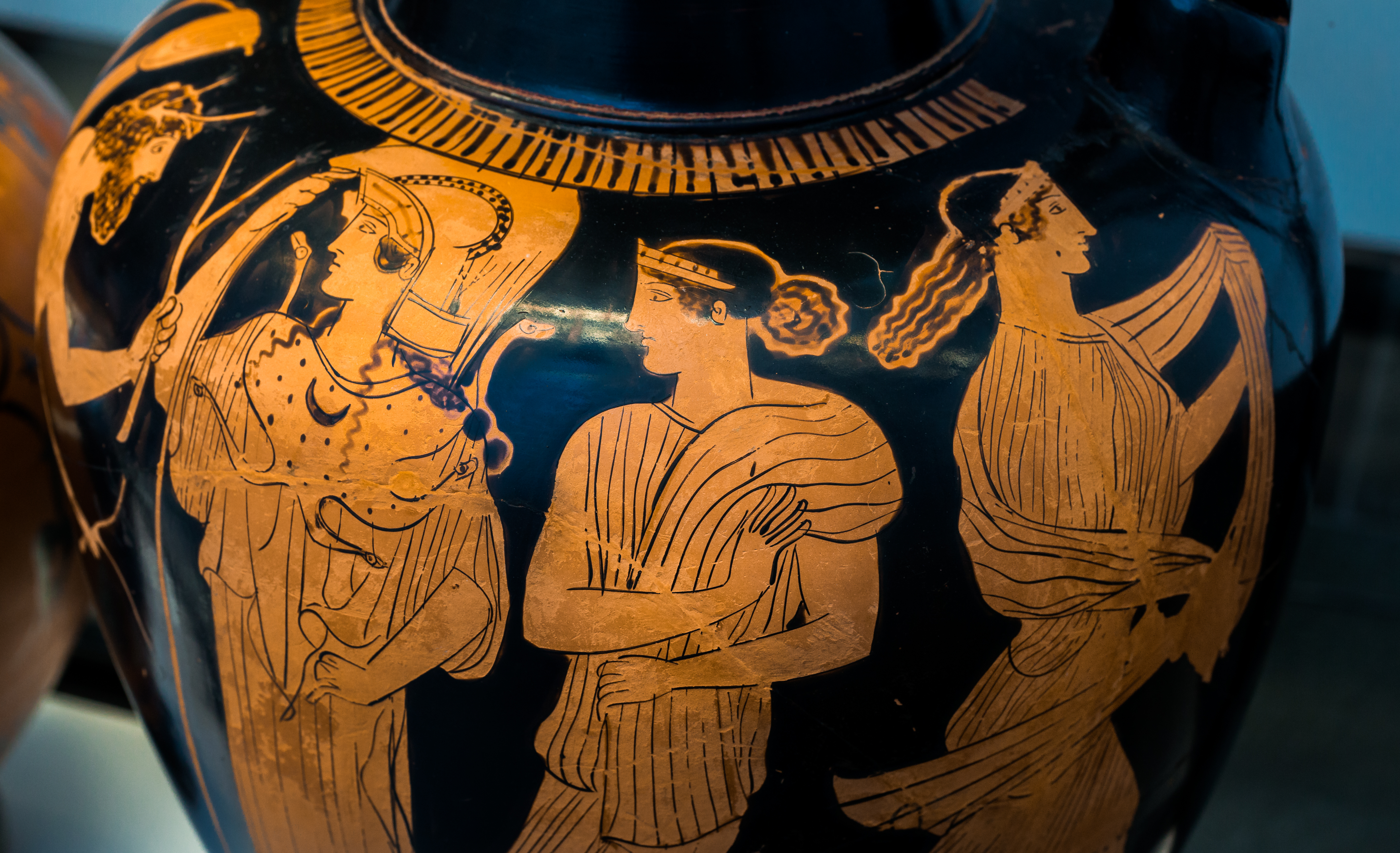
Nausicaa (second from right) with Athena and Odysseus. Detail of an Attic red-figured amphora from Vulci (c. 440 BC)

Nausicaa (/nɔːˈsɪkɪə/; Ancient Greek: Ναυσικάα, romanized: Nausikáa [nau̯sikáaː], or Ναυσικᾶ, Nausikâ, [nau̯sikâː]), also spelled Nausicaä or Nausikaa, is a character in Homer's Odyssey. She is the daughter of King Alcinous and Queen Arete of Phaeacia. Her name means "burner of ships" (ναῦς 'ship'; κάω 'to burn').

== Role in the Odyssey ==
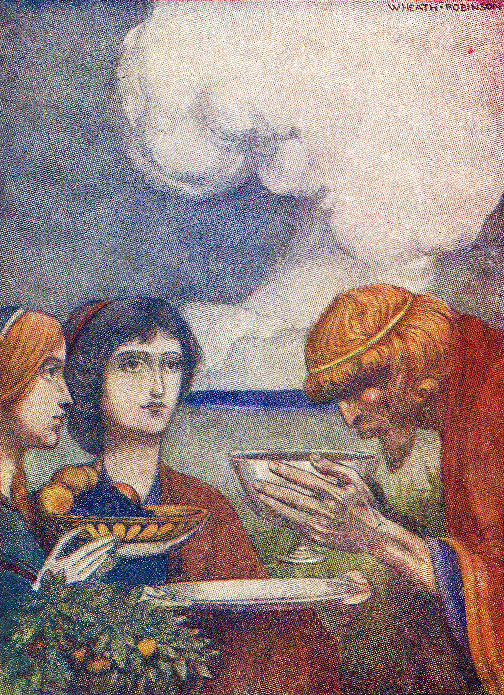
W. Heath Robinson: Nausicaa and Her Maidens Brought Him Food and Wine (date unknown)

In Book Six of the Odyssey, Odysseus is shipwrecked on the coast of the island of Scheria (Phaeacia in some translations). Nausicaä and her handmaidens go to the seashore to wash clothes. Awakened by their games, Odysseus emerges from the forest completely naked, scaring the servants away, and begs Nausicaä for aid. Affected by the unfortunate hero, she gives Odysseus some clothes and takes him to the edge of the town. Keeping him secret, she goes ahead into town, telling him to go directly to Alcinous's house and make his case to Nausicaä's mother Queen Arete, the family's matriarch. Odysseus approaches Arete and wins her approval, and he is received as a guest by King Alcinous.

During his stay, Odysseus recounts his adventures to Alcinous and his court, a frame story for a substantial portion of the Odyssey. Alcinous then generously provides Odysseus with the ships that finally bring him home to Ithaca.

Nausicaä is young and beautiful; Odysseus says she resembles the goddess Artemis. She has several brothers.

Homer gives a literary account of a love which is never expressed (one of the earliest examples of unrequited love in literature). Nausicaä is presented as a potential love interest for Odysseus: she tells her friend that she would like her husband to be like him, and her father tells Odysseus that he would let him marry her. Nausicaä is also a mother figure for Odysseus; she ensures his return home, and says "Never forget me, for I gave you life". Odysseus never tells Penelope about his encounter with Nausicaä, out of all the women he met on his long journey home. Some suggest this indicates a deeper feeling for the young woman.

== Other accounts ==
According to Aristotle and Dictys of Crete, Nausicaa later married Odysseus's son Telemachus, and had one or two sons, Poliporthes or/and Persepolis. According to some versions, the father of one of Nausicaa's sons was Odysseus himself rather than his son Telemachus.

Agallis attributes the invention of the ancient Greek ball-dance to Nausicaa.

== In popular media ==
She was portrayed by Katie Carr in the 1997 miniseries The Odyssey.

== Gallery ==
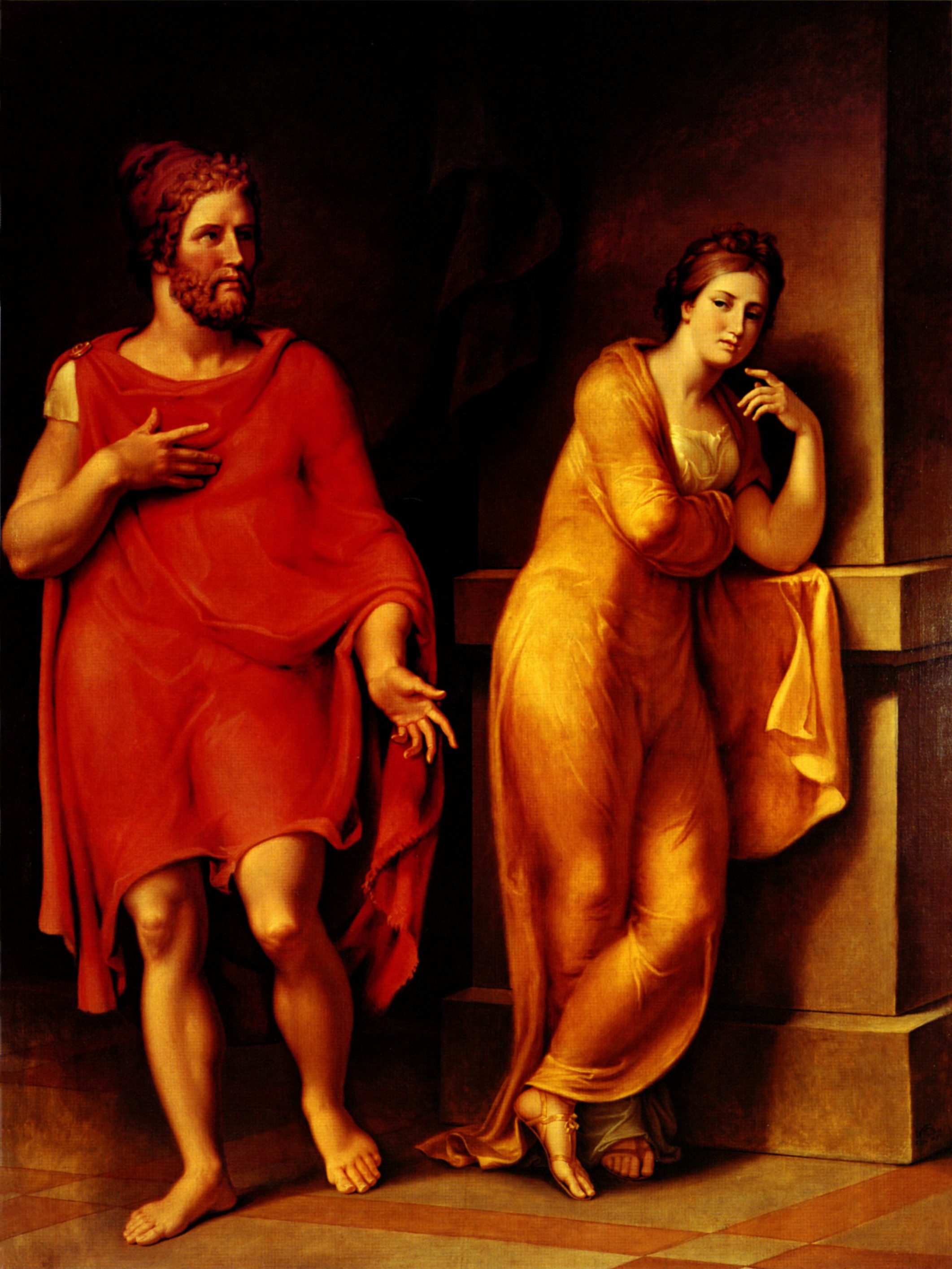
Tischbein: Odysseus and Nausicaa (1819).

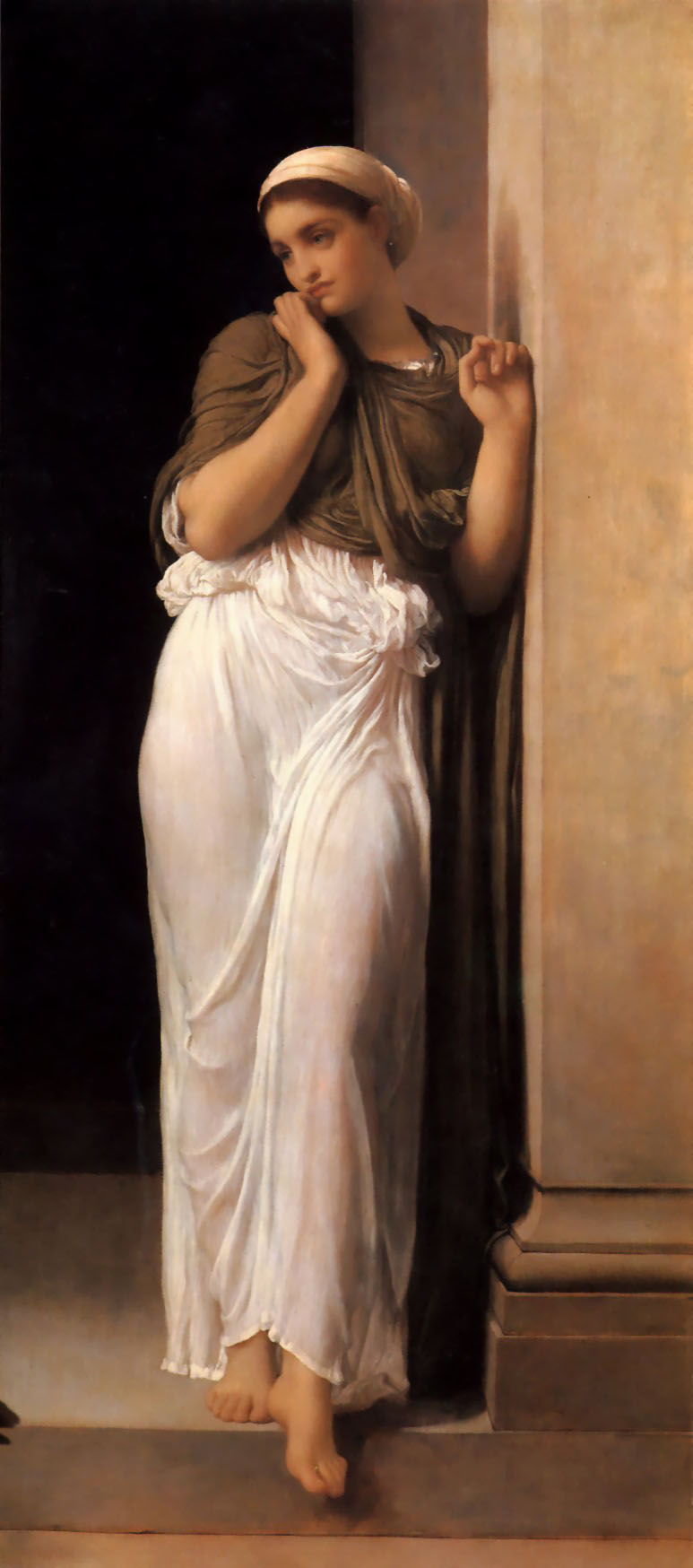
Frederick Leighton: Nausicaa (1878).

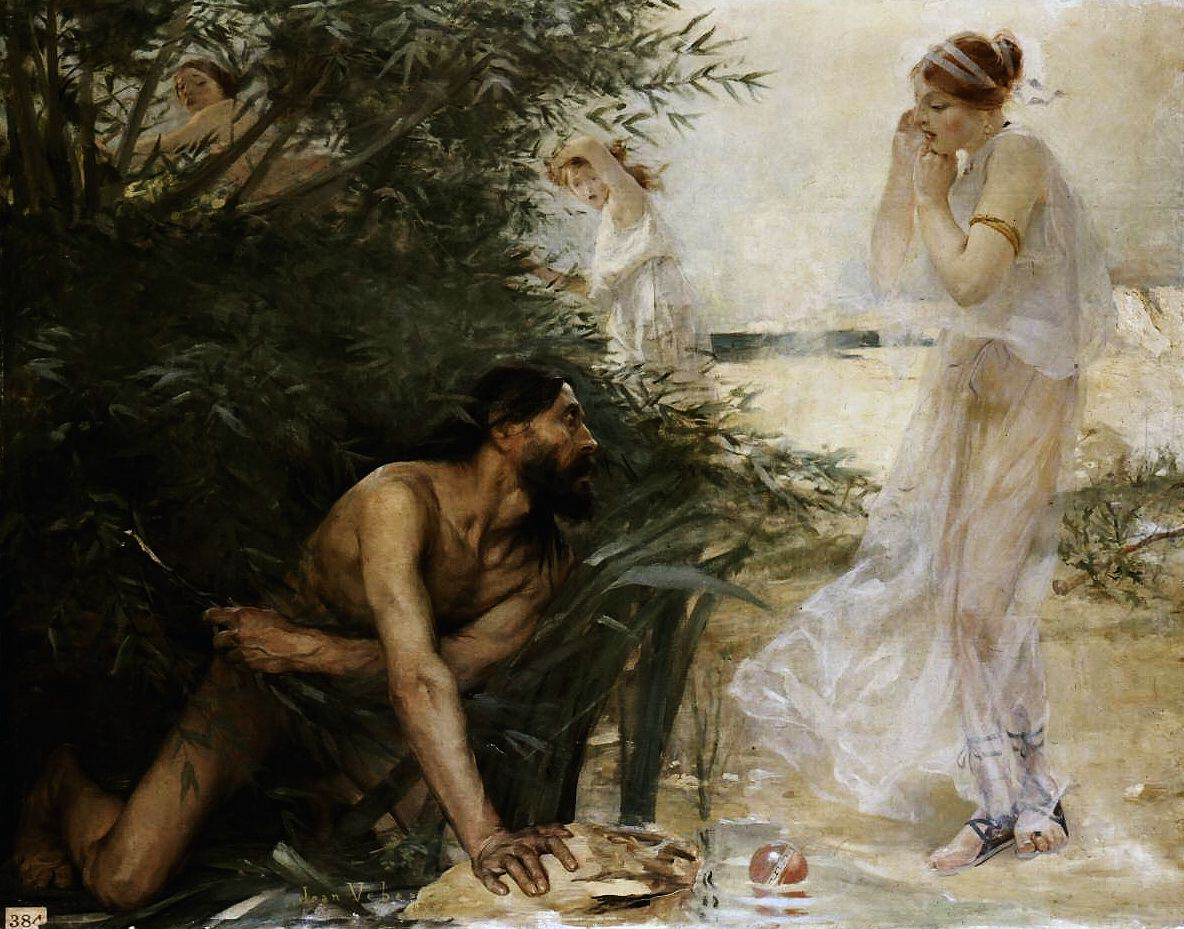
Jean Veber: Ulysses and Nausicaa (1888).

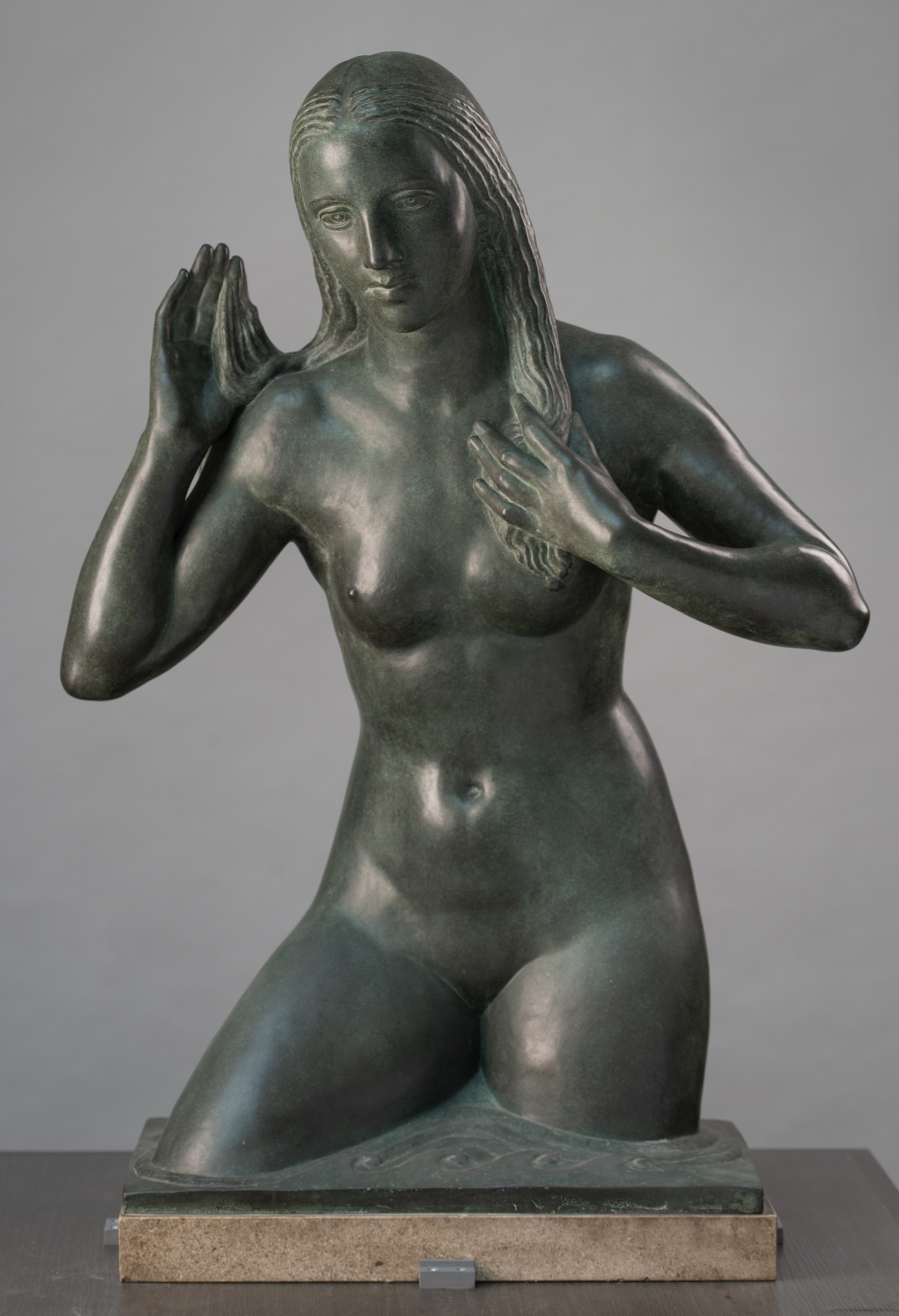
Robert Jackson Emerson: Nausicaa.

== Sources ==
- Portions of this material originated as excerpts from the public-domain 1848 edition of the Classical Dictionary by John Lemprière.
