= Frame story =

Story in a nested narration that brackets one or more embedded stories

A frame story (also known as a frame tale, framing device, frame narrative, sandwich narrative, nested narrative, or intercalation) is the literary technique and narrative structure in which an opening narrative introduces either a more emphasized second narrative or a set of shorter tales. The frame story leads readers from a first story into one or more other in-depth stories within it. In other words, a frame story is the use of one or more stories-within-a-story across the majority of a narrative's content, where the inner story is the main one: the one with the most detail.

The frame story may be used to inform readers about aspects of the secondary narrative(s) that may otherwise be hard to understand. This should not be confused with narrative structure. Notable examples are the 1001 Nights and The Decameron.

== Origins ==
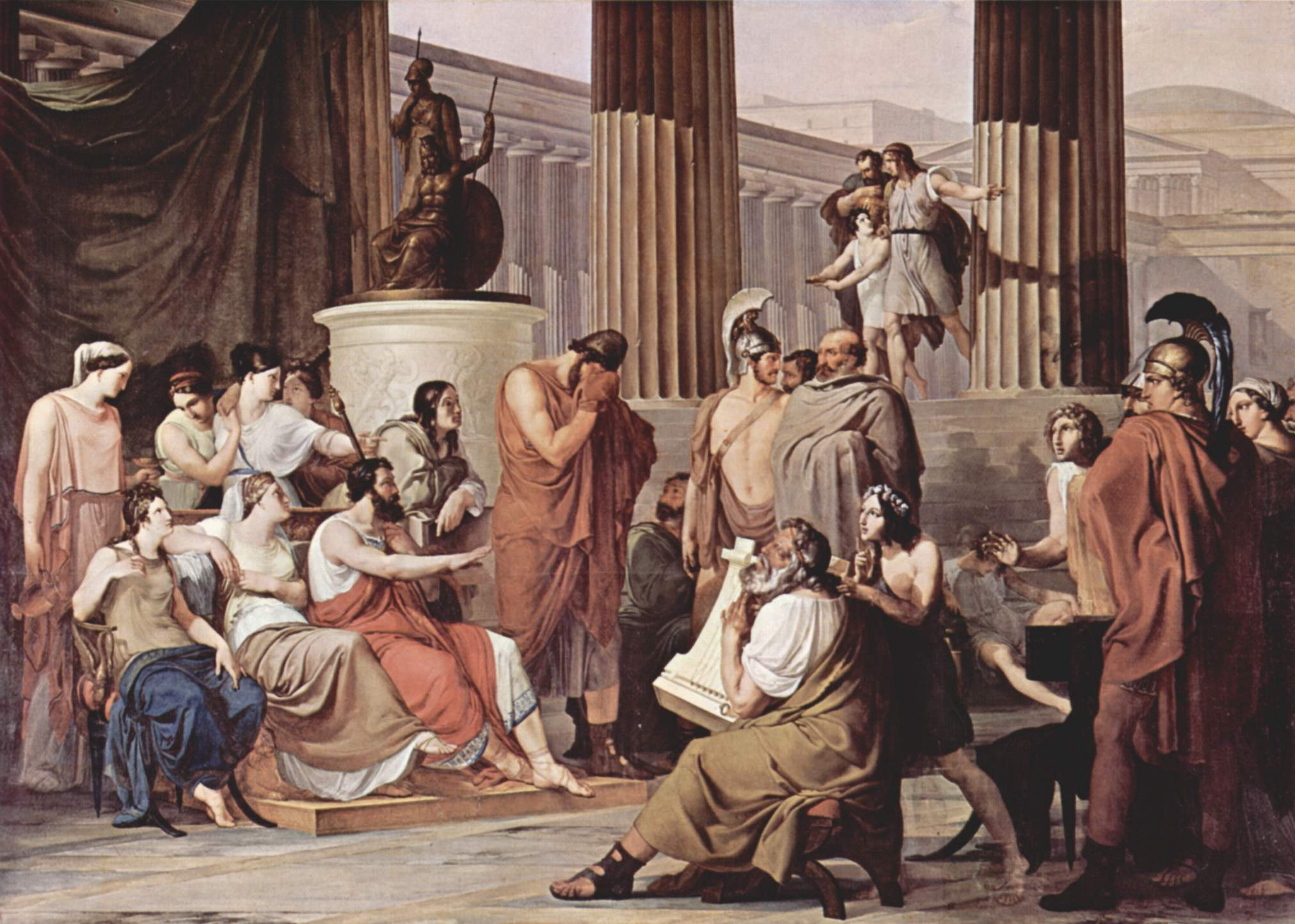
One of the earliest frame stories is in the Odyssey, which includes a section where Odysseus tells stories to King Alcinous on the island of Scheria. Painting of Odysseus at the Court of Alcinous by Francesco Hayez, 1814–1815

Some of the earliest frame stories are from ancient Egypt, including one in the Papyrus Westcar, the Tale of the Shipwrecked Sailor, and The Eloquent Peasant. Other early examples are from Indian literature, including the Sanskrit epics Mahabharata, Ramayana, Panchatantra, Syntipas's The Seven Wise Masters, and the fable collections Hitopadesha and Vikram and The Vampire. This form gradually spread west through the centuries and became popular, giving rise to such classic frame tale collections as the One Thousand and One Nights (Arabian Nights), The Decameron, and the Canterbury Tales, in which each pilgrim tells his own kind of tale, and whose frame story "was once the most admired part of Chaucer's work". "The frame tale reached the height of its popularity in Europe in the 14th century with the composition of Juan Ruiz's Libro de buen amor (1330–1343)."

The use of a frame story in which a single narrative is set in the context of the telling of a story is also a technique with a long history, dating back at least to the second fourth of Homer's Odyssey, in which the narrator Odysseus tells of his wandering in the court of King Alcinous.

== A set of stories ==
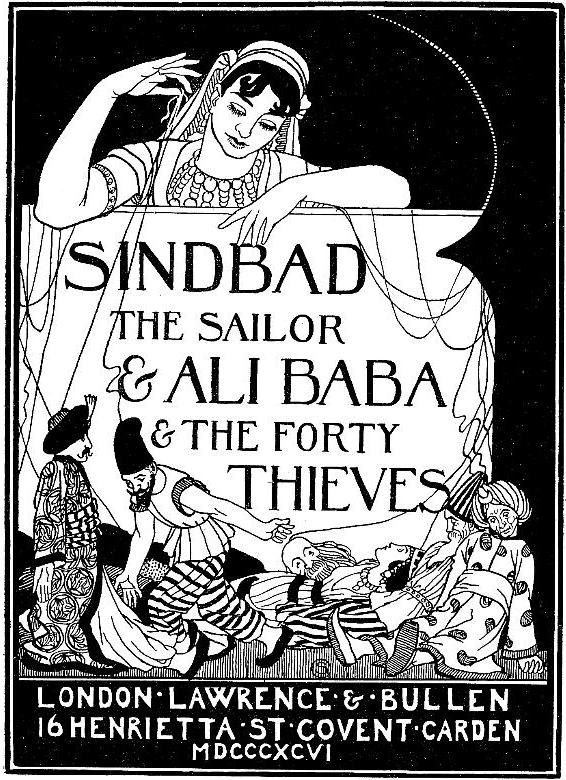
One Thousand and One Nights frames many stories with a single narrator, Shahrazad; embedded within it are further framed sets of tales, such as those of Sindbad the Sailor. Illustration Sindbad the sailor and Ali Baba and the forty thieves by William Strang, 1896

A frame story is a literary device that acts as a convenient conceit to organize a set of smaller narratives, either devised by the author or taken from a previous stock of popular tales, slightly altered by the author for the purpose of the longer narrative. Sometimes a story within the main narrative encapsulates some aspect of the framing story, in which case it is called a mise en abyme.

A typical frame story is One Thousand and One Nights, in which the character Scheherazade narrates a set of fairy tales to the Sultan Shahriyar over many nights. Many of Shahrazad's tales are also frame stories, such as Tale of Sindbad the Seaman and Sindbad the Landsman, a collection of adventures related by Sindbad the Seaman to Sindbad the Landsman.

Ovid's Metamorphoses makes extensive use of framing, with the stories nested several deep, allowing the inclusion of many different tales in one work. Emily Brontë's Wuthering Heights uses this literary device to tell the story of Heathcliff and Catherine, along with the subplots. Her sister Anne uses this device in her epistolary novel The Tenant of Wildfell Hall. The main heroine's diary is framed by the narrator's story and letters.

Mary Shelley's novel Frankenstein has multiple framed narratives. In the book, Robert Walton writes letters to his sister, describing the story told to him by the scientist Victor Frankenstein. Midway through Frankenstein's story, he is met by the monster, who tells him his own story after he was created, and this third narrative even briefly contains the tale of a family whom he had been observing. This set of frame narratives that fit together is sometimes called a Chinese box narrative; other instances of this style of narrative can be found in Plato's Symposion, Jostein Gaarder's The Solitaire Mystery, Emily Brontë's Wuthering Heights, and Joseph Conrad's Heart of Darkness.

Frame stories have appeared in comic books. Neil Gaiman's comic book series The Sandman featured a story arc called Worlds End which consisted of frame stories, and sometimes even featured stories within stories within stories.

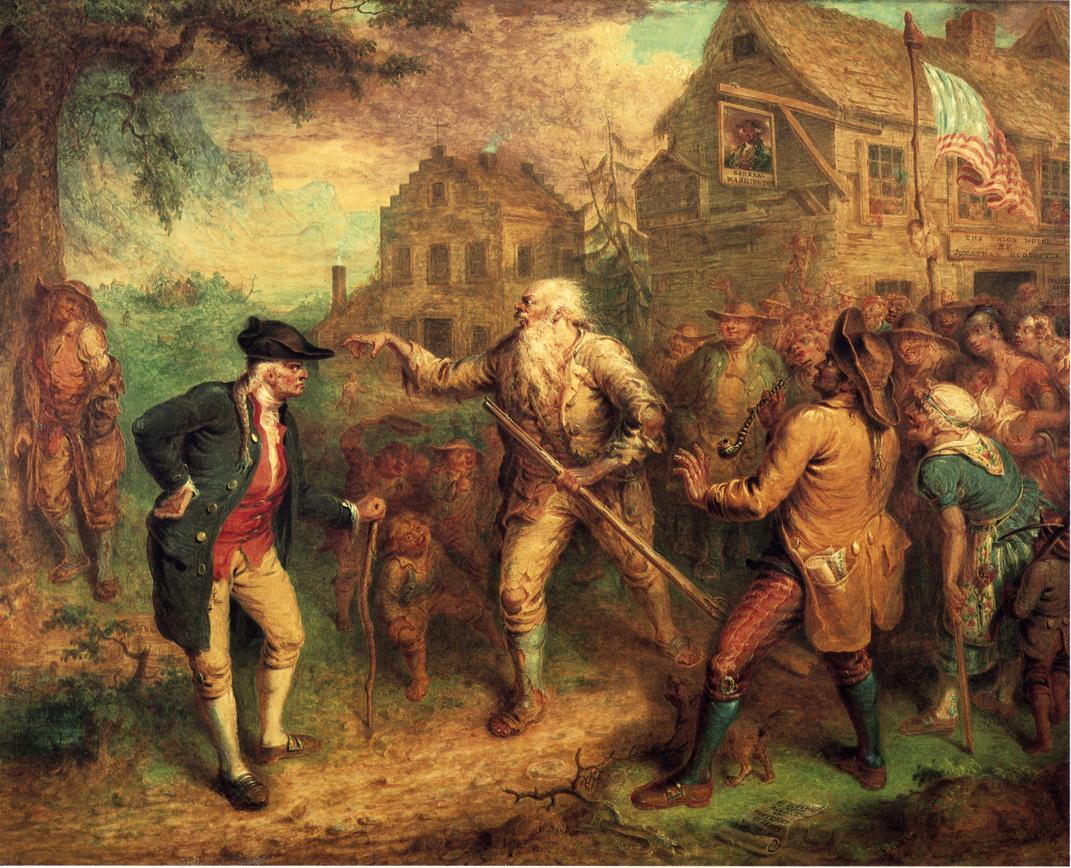
The Return of Rip Van Winkle, painting by John Quidor, 1849

Sometimes, as in Washington Irving's Sketch Book, which contains "The Legend of Sleepy Hollow" and "Rip Van Winkle" among others, the conceit is that the author of the book is not the real author but a fictional character, in this case a man named Crayon. Here the frame includes the world of the imagined Crayon, his stories, and the reader who is assumed to play along and "know" who Crayon is.

== Single story ==
When there is a single story, the frame story is used for other purposes – chiefly to position the reader's attitude toward the tale. This can be done in a variety of ways.

=== Casting doubt on the narrator ===
A common reason to frame one story is to draw attention to the narrator's unreliability. By explicitly making the narrator a character within the frame story, the writer distances themself from the narrator. The writer may characterize the narrator to cast doubt on the narrator's truthfulness, as when in P. G. Wodehouse's stories of Mr. Mulliner, Mulliner is made a fly fisherman, a person who is expected to tell tales of unbelievably large fish. The movie Amadeus is framed as a story that an old Antonio Salieri tells to a young priest, because the movie is based more on stories Salieri told about Mozart than on historical fact.

=== Procatalepsis ===
Another use is a form of procatalepsis, where the writer puts the readers' possible reactions to the story in the characters listening to it. In The Princess Bride, the frame of a grandfather reading the story to his reluctant grandson puts the cynical reaction a viewer might have to the romantic fairytale into the story, through the grandson's persona, and helps defuse it. This is the use when the frame tells a story that lacks a strong narrative hook in its opening; the narrator can engage the reader's interest by telling the story to answer the curiosity of his listeners, or by warning them that the story began in an ordinary seeming way, but they must follow it to understand later actions, thereby identifying the reader's wondering whether the story is worth reading to the listeners'. Such an approach was used, too, by Edith Wharton in her novella Ethan Frome, in which a nameless narrator hears from many characters in the town of Starkfield about the main character Ethan's story.

=== False documents ===
A frame story may use "false documents" to explain how the story-within-a story has been uncovered. Examples include letters provided to Mr Utterson in the Strange Case of Dr Jekyll and Mr Hyde, the 'Historical Notes' epilogue of The Handmaid's Tale (which explains that the preceding narrative was originally recorded on a set of audio cassettes), and epistolary novels in general.

=== Dream vision ===
A specialized form of the frame is a dream vision, where the narrator claims to have gone to sleep, dreamed the events of the story, and then awoken to tell the tale. In medieval Europe, this was a common device, used to indicate that the events included are fictional; Geoffrey Chaucer used it in The Book of the Duchess, The House of Fame, Parlement of Foules, and The Legend of Good Women (the last also containing a multi-story frame story within the dream). Later, John Bunyan used a dream device in the Christian allegory Pilgrim's Progress and its sequel, explaining that they were dreams he had while he was in prison and felt God wanted him to write down. This worked because it made what might have been seen as a fantasy more like a divine revelation to others who believed as he did.

In modern usage, it is sometimes used in works of fantasy as a means toward suspension of disbelief about the marvels depicted in the story. J.R.R. Tolkien, in his essay "On Fairy-Stories" complained of such devices as unwillingness to treat the genre seriously; he used frame stories of different kinds in his Middle-earth writings. Lewis Carroll's Alice stories (Alice's Adventures in Wonderland and Through the Looking-Glass) includes such a frame, the stories themselves using dream-like logic and sequences.

Still, even as the story proceeds realistically, the dream frame casts doubt on the events. In the book The Wonderful Wizard of Oz, the events really occur; the dream frame added for the movie detracts from the validity of the fantasy.

== Use ==
To be a frame narrative, the story must act primarily as an occasion for the telling of other stories. For example, Odysseus narrates much of the Odyssey to the Phaeacians, but, even though this recollection forms a great part of the poem, the events after and before the interpolated recollection are of greater interest than the memory.

A film that plays with frame narrative is the 1994 film Forrest Gump. Most of it is narrated by Forrest to various companions on the bus-stop bench. However, in the last fifth or so of the film, Forrest gets up and leaves the bench, and we follow him as he meets with Jenny and her son. This final segment suddenly has no narrator unlike the rest of the film that came before it, but is instead told through Forrest and Jenny's dialogues.

This approach is also demonstrated in the 2008 film Slumdog Millionaire (adapted from the 2005 novel Q & A), about a poor street kid named Jamal who comes close to winning Kaun Banega Crorepati (the Indian equivalent of Who Wants to Be a Millionaire?) but finds himself accused of cheating. Most of the story is narrated at a police station by Jamal, who explains how he knew the answers to each of the questions as the show is played back on video. The show itself then serves as another framing device, as Jamal sees flashbacks of his past as each question is asked. The last portion of the film then unfolds without any narrator.

== Compared to reprise ==
In musical sonata form or rondo, a reprised theme occurs at the beginning and end of the work, or returns periodically. A framing device may take the form of a recurrent element at the beginning and end of the narrative. For example, a story may begin with a character visiting a park under one set of circumstances, then returning at the end to the same park under a different set of circumstances, having undergone a change that allows him or her to see the park in a new light.

A framing device might simply be a defining image of the narrative or art that is used at the beginning and end of the work, as in the film Chariots of Fire which begins and ends with the characters running along a beach, accompanied at both times by the movie's famous theme music. This scene, although chronologically in the middle of the film and unimportant to the straightforward plot, serves to convey a defining emotion and tone that sets the context for the main story.

== See also ==
- Fan fiction – Type of fiction created by fans of the original subject
- Fictional universe – Self-consistent fictional setting
- Parallel novel – Pastiche novel with in-universe continuity
- Spin-off (media) – Narrative work derived from existing works
