= Shaun Bartlett (singer) =

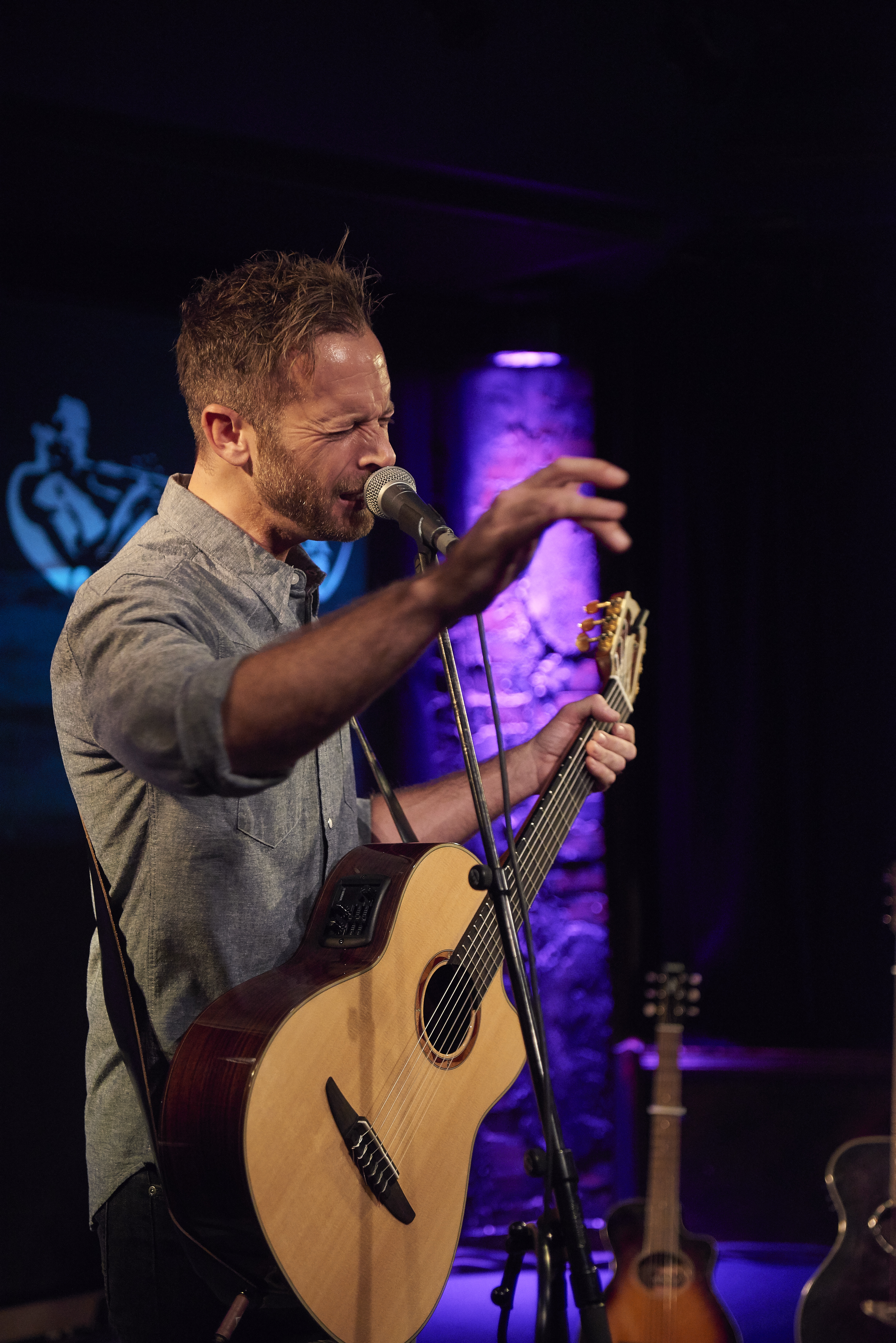
- Shaun Bartlett performing at Herr Nilsen, Oslo (2015)

Background information
- Born: 18 December 1976 (age 48); Plymouth, England
- Genres: Singer-songwriter; pop; alternative
- Occupation(s): Singer, lyricist and composer
- Labels: Red Means Run
- Website: shaunbartlett-music.com

Shaun Bartlett (born 18 December 1976) is a British-Norwegian singer, lyricist and composer. He lives in Norway where he was the lead singer for several bands before his solo debut in 2006. He is mostly known in Norway for his performances on Gullruten (2015) and The Voice (2012) where he worked closely with Magne Furuholmen from a-ha. He also co-wrote the theme song Saviour Unknown for Scandinavian noir series Øyevitne/Eyewitness (2014), and other soundtracks for series and films such as The Orange Girl (2009).

== Early life ==
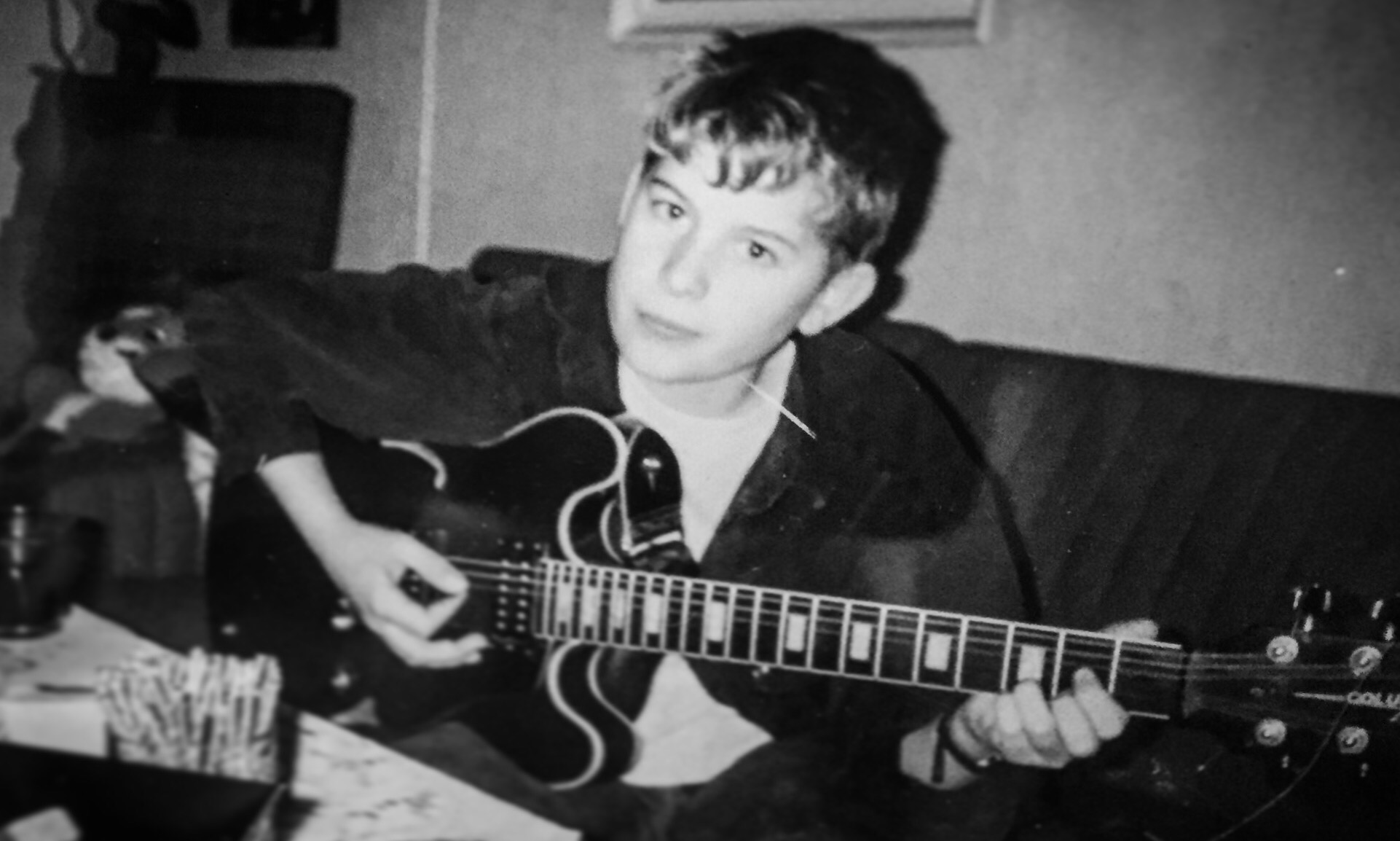
Shaun Bartlett in a sofa (1991)

His Norwegian mother, Elin Bartlett, looked after the horses at Øvrevoll Galoppbane, where his British father, Trevor Bartlett, rode as a successful jockey for a few years. They later moved to Devon, England, where Shaun and his brother spent their first years. Soon his father was offered a full-time position to race for His Highness the Emir Sheik Isa bin Salman Al Khalifa and the family moved to the island of Bahrain where Shaun and his brother grew up living in the Awali compound. In the summer of 1986 his parents divorced and Shaun moved with his mother to live in Bærum Municipality, Norway.

The following Christmas he got his first keyboard and within the next couple of years he had a bedroom full of musical instruments and recording equipment where he'd spend days at a time writing and recording his very first songs and demo tapes. In his teens he met his first bandmates and started spending most of his time in Asker, making progressive rock in a basement and playing concerts at the local club and annual festival. From 1993 to 2000 he fronted several local bands from Asker Municipality.

== Career ==
In 1998, Yelp, his band at the time, received a request from Oslo BASE to do the soundtrack for the world's first ever BASE jumping film 1st BASE. The band reunited in the studio for a few months in 2005 to also do the soundtrack for 2nd BASE. Between the band breaking up in 1999 and their soundtrack reunion he'd started writing material that would later be released on the solo debut album Sometimes Divided in 2006 – recorded at Larsville Studio in Stugudalen, owned by Lars Gunnar Lien: former member of Norwegian rockers Motorspycho. The album was recorded together with his backing band at the time and engineered by Pål Brekkås (Marthe Valle, The South, Ida Jenshus ++). It was rewarded good reviews and paved the way for Shaun's first performances outside of Oslo.

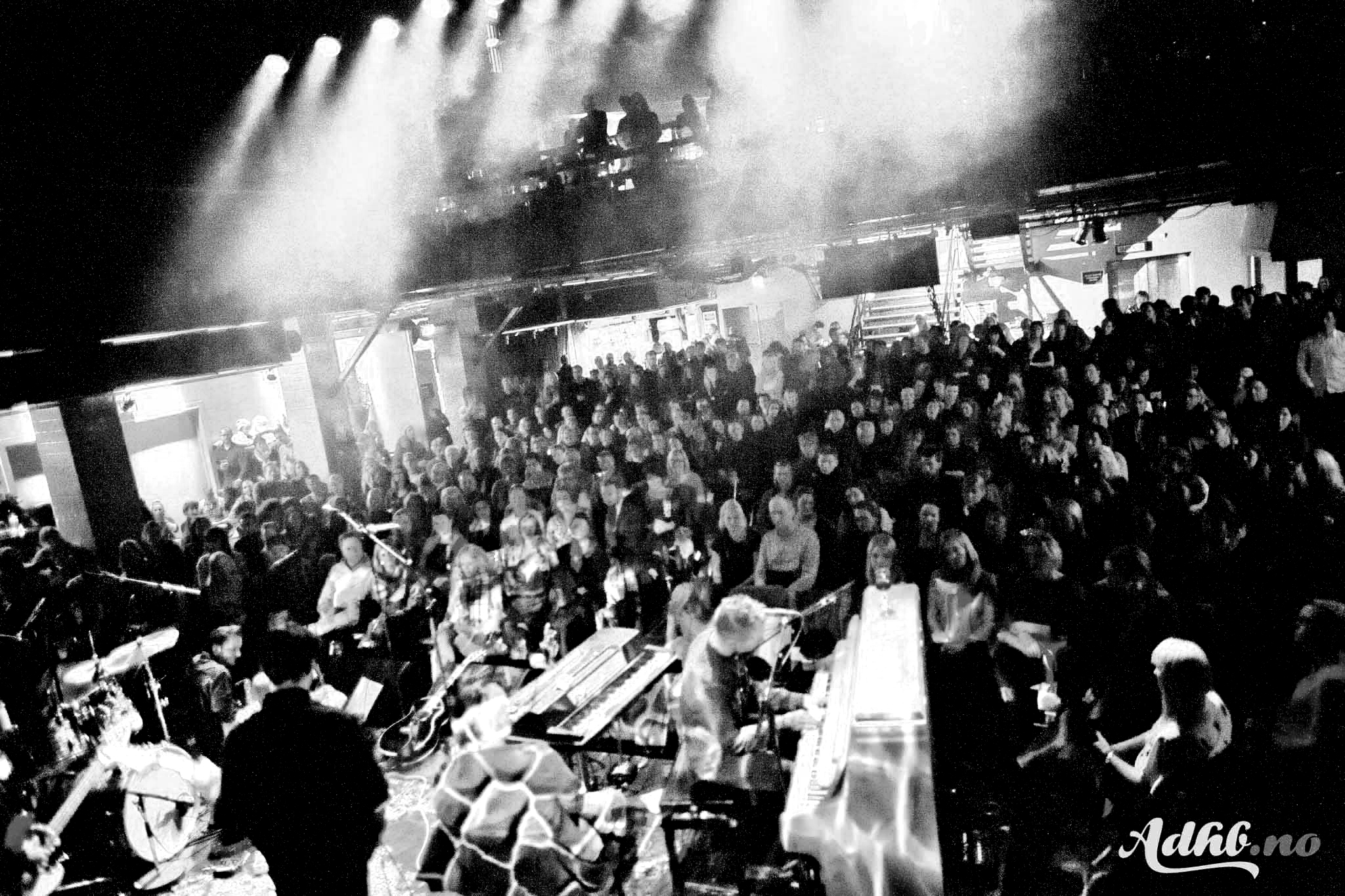
Shaun Bartlett performing live at Rockefeller, Oslo (2015)

The following year he went back to Larsville to record his second album Shrink The City to a Light, released in 2008. He played almost all instruments on the album himself apart from some additional tracks played by Pål Brekkås who also engineered and mixed the album. The songs Silk, Secret Mission and Timetravelling were featured on the soundtrack for the film for Jostein Gaarder's novel The Orange Girl in 2008 and singles Silk and Miles From The City Lights were listed on NRK P3, making Shaun Bartlett the longest listed artist that year.

Between his second and third album Green Means Walk Red Means Run (2014) he supported Leonard Cohen at Bislett Stadium, travelled around the world and climbed to the top of Kilimanjaro for inspiration, and became a favourite on The Voice in Norway (2012). All three singles from the album were listed on Norway's national radio station NRK P1 amongst local radio stations across the country. The third album's title song Green Means Walk Red Means Run, inspired by Dr Masaru Emoto's way of seeing everydayness from such a different angle, was listed on P4 Radio Hele Norge in 2015 and the album itself was recorded at Ocean Sound Recordings located on the shore of Giske, a beautiful island just outside Ålesund on Norway's west coast – known for its outstanding nature with mountain peaks and weather contrasts, not to mention the island's annual music festival Sommerfesten på Giske, where Shaun played live in 2015. His latest studio recording Saviour Unknown (lyrics written and performed by Shaun Bartlett, music written and performed by Bent Åserud and Geir Bøhren from Norwegian progressive rock band Junipher Greene) is the theme song for Scandinavian noir series Øyevitne/Eyewitness.

== Discography ==
=== Albums ===
- "Roots and Veins (2021)
- "Synthpop" -EP (2018)
- "Going Places" - instrumental EP (2017)
- "Oslo Solo" – live album (2016)
- "Green Means Walk Red Means Run" (2014)
- "Shrink The City to a Light" (2008)
- "Sometimes Divided" (2006)

=== Singles ===
- "One One One One" (2017)
- "Saviour Unknown" (2014)
- "Worried Mind" (2014)
- "Ashes on Fire" (2013)
- "In No Time" (2013)
- "Love Give Take" (2013)
- "Dragon on a Plane" (2011)
- "Miles From The City Lights" (2008)

=== Albums (collaboration) ===
1996	1998	2004	2009	2010	2011
ObiWon	ObiWon	P3	Mua & Shaun	Container	Yelp
NoseJob	Thoughts on Hold	Rørt & Urørt	Other Places	Container	Yelp

=== Songs (collaboration) ===
- "My Goodbye" with IAMSOUND (2016)
- "How Did We Get Here" with Hanne Sørvaag (2016)
- "Girls Just Wanna Have Fun" with Shaun Bartlett & Ida Stein (2013)
- "Therapy" with Container (2011)
- "Starstruck" with Diablo Archer (2008)
- "Grow Without You" with Mua & Shaun (2004)
