= Sophie's World (video game) =

1997 video game

- Developer: The Multimedia Corporation
- Publisher: Voyager
- Platforms: MacOS, Microsoft Windows
- Release: 1997
- Genre: Adventure

Sophie's World is a 1997 educational adventure video game developed by The Multimedia Corporation and published by Voyager for MacOS and Microsoft Windows. It is an adaptation of the novel Sophie's World by Norwegian writer Jostein Gaarder, in which players must help guide protagonist Sophie Amundsen whilst considering and answer philosophical questions. The game also contained interactive resources and diagrams on major philosophers of history. Upon release, the game received positive reviews from critics, who praised the adaptation's unique subject matter for software and its supporting resources.

== Gameplay ==
Players assume the role as a tester of a fictitious virtual reality program named DYAUS, an experimental representation of philosophy. The aim of the game is to guide the eponymous character Sophie Amundsen, a young Norwegian schoolgirl through DYAUS. Sophie receives messages from her mysterious tutor and guide, Alberto Knox, to influence her journey across a series of scenes, rather than being directly accompanied as in the book. Each scene focuses on a historical setting or event relating to philosophy, where Alberto will pose philosophical questions to the player which can be answered through an interactive dialog box. To progress to the next scene, players must complete a puzzle or provide a valid response to questions from Alberto or other characters. Some responses to question may open up different progression through the game, and emails sent and received by Sophie progress the game's story. Players navigate between scenes using point and click controls to navigate between entries on an interactive timeline. It also features an automatic save system. The software also includes an interactive reference guide with several features: the Philosophy Band provides narrated slideshows on 28 philosophers such as Zeno of Elea, Saint Augustine, Baruch Spinoza, and Immanuel Kant, and concepts explored in their work. Big Questions depicts the positions of these philosophers on major philosophical questions in a table. Players can search references in the guide by topic or keyword, compare and contrast philosophers, and browse related links on the Internet.

== Development ==
Sophie's World was created by British development studio Multimedia Corporation, who had previously created educational software titles including 3D Atlas and ABC of Animals. Led by producer and creative director Ailsa Barry, the game was created over an 18 month schedule with a £1 million budget. The game sold 100,000 copies worldwide. In September 1997, the company was wound down and ceased trading, although continued to collect royalties from sales of the game.

== Critical reception ==
=== Reviews ===
Reception

Review scores
Publication	Score
PC Format	79%
Just Adventure	B−
PC Review	9/10

Describing the game as "superbly-designed", PC Format considered the software was an "interesting" introduction to philosophy and that its merging of philosophy and gameplay was "carefully considered". Critics disagreed on the depth of the philosophical resources in the software, with some finding them rewarding, and others considering they lacked depth. PC Review, assessing the game as an ambitious work, found its execution "near-flawless", its reference guide strong on its own, and demonstrated the potential of multimedia, although felt the game could have covered the work of newer philosophers in more detail. Just Adventure felt the game's subject matter featured "striking visuals and [a] surreal atmosphere", and was "extremely imaginative and diverse", but was short in length. The Independent enjoyed the visual presentation as an "attractive" representation of an inquisitive mind, considering it had "plenty of variety in both theme and graphic style" to encourage exploration. Teaching Philosophy found the software "very attractive and rich in content" as a medium for philosophical education.

=== Accolades ===
At the 1997 British Interactive Media Association Awards, Sophie's World received a craft award for sound and music.
