= Eva Dahr =

Norwegian film director, playwright, and producer (1958–2019)

Eva Frederikke Dahr
- Born: 30 October 1958; Oslo, Norway
- Died: 12 May 2019 (aged 60)
- Occupations: Film director; playwright; film producer
- Known for: Short films

Eva Frederikke Dahr (30 October 1958 – 12 May 2019) was a Norwegian film director, playwright, and film producer. She studied at Volda University College and the Bela Balaz studio in Budapest, Hungary.

Dahr was a prolific director of short films. She was the conceptual director of the TV drama Himmelblå (2008–10) and also directed the film The Orange Girl, a 2009 adaptation of the 2003 Jostein Gaarder novel Appelsinpiken. Together with her sister, actress Juni Dahr, she made two short films, Dolce Vita (1989) and Troll (1991).

The director won many Norwegian and international awards, including an Amanda Award and a Gullstolen at the Kortfilmfestivalen i Grimstad, for the short film En mann (1997).

Dahr died in 2019 at age 60, following a long illness.

== Selected filmography ==
- 1985: Burning Flowers – feature film (co-director)
- 1989: Dolce Vita – short film (director, producer)
- 1991: Troll – short film (director, producer)
- 1993: Fjording – short film (director, producer)
- 1994: Drømmehesten – short film (director, writer)
- 1996: In Transit – short film (director)
- 1997: 1996 - Pust på meg! – short film (director)
- 1997: En mann – short film (director, writer, producer)
- 1998: Veddemålet – short film (director, producer)
- 1999: Taktikk – short film (director, producer)
- 2004: Tempo! – short film (director, writer)
- 2006: Trette menn – short film (director, writer, producer)
- 2006–14: Hotel Cæsar – television series (director)
- 2007: Mars & Venus – feature film (director, writer)
- 2008–10: Himmelblå – television series (director)
- 2009: The Orange Girl – feature film (director)
