= Buxtehude Bull =

German Youth literary award

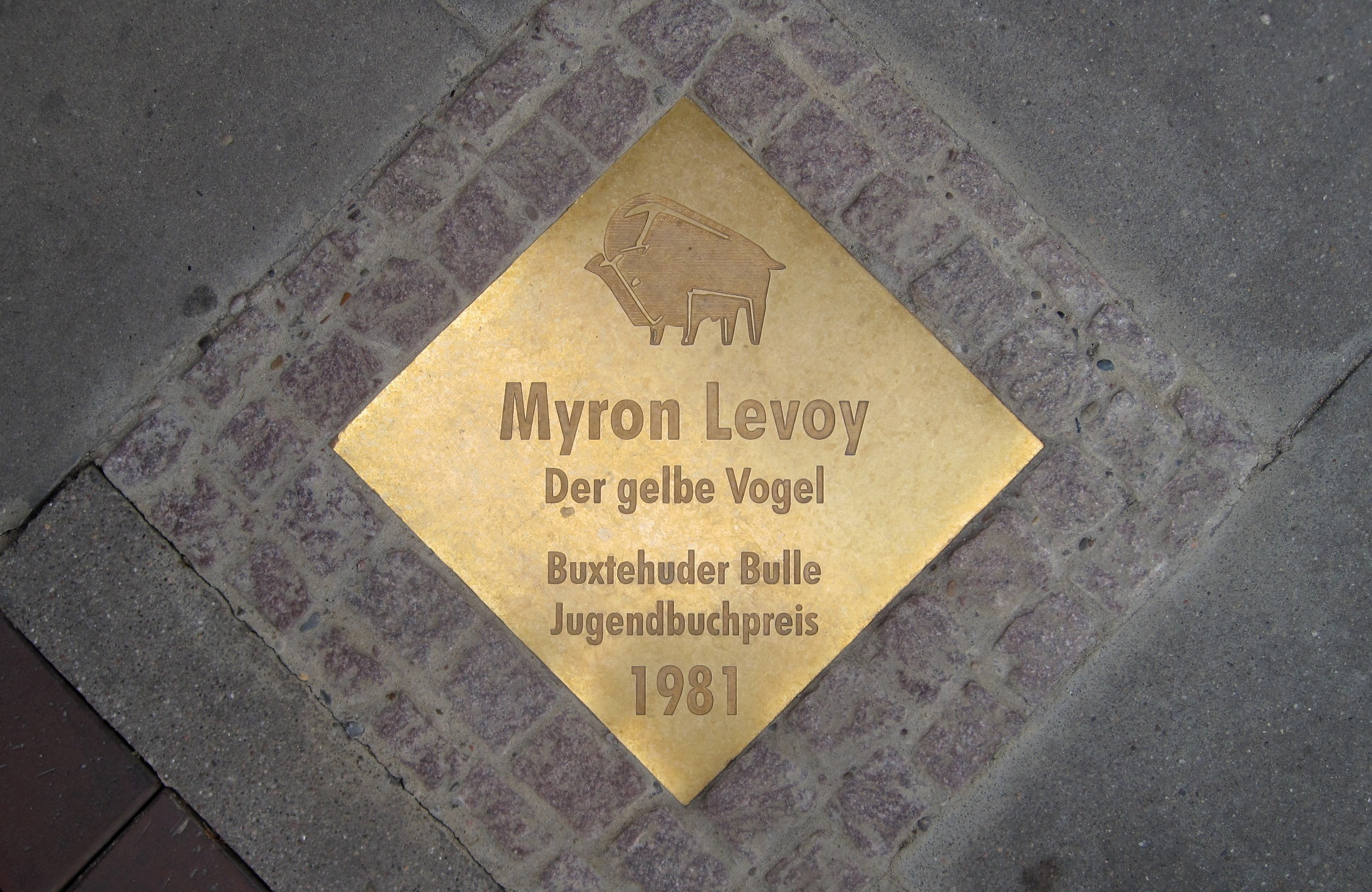
Recipient 1981: Myron Levoy

The Buxtehude Bull (German: Buxtehuder Bulle) is an award for youth literature, established in 1971 by Winfried Ziemann, a local book merchant from Buxtehude, a Hanseatic City located in the Hamburg Metropolitan Region. The town council took over the sponsorship of the award in 1981. The award is given annually to the best children's or young-adults' book published in German (either native language or translated) in the preceding year. The writer is presented with a small steel statue of the bull (German: Bulle) Ferdinand, from the popular work The Story of Ferdinand by Munro Leaf, and also receives a monetary prize of €5,000.

== Recipients ==
- 1971: Alexander Sutherland Neill, Die grüne Wolke
- 1972: Cili Wethekam, Tignasse, Kind der Revolution
- 1973: Tilman Röhrig, Thoms Bericht
- 1974: Gail Graham, Zwischen den Feuern
- 1975: Johanna Reiss, Und im Fenster der Himmel
- 1976: Jaap ter Haar, Behalt das Leben lieb
- 1977: Gudrun Pausewang, Die Not der Familie Caldera
- 1978: Leonie Ossowski, Stern ohne Himmel
- 1979: Michael Ende, Die unendliche Geschichte (The Neverending Story)
- 1980: Hermann Vinke, Das kurze Leben der Sophie Scholl
- 1981: Myron Levoy, Der gelbe Vogel (Alan and Naomi)
- 1982: Rudolf Frank, Der Junge, der seinen Geburtstag vergaß
- 1983: Gudrun Pausewang, Die letzten Kinder von Schewenborn (The Last Children of Schewenborn)
- 1984: Mildred D. Taylor, Donnergrollen hör mein Schrei'n
- 1985: Urs M. Fiechtner, Annas Geschichte
- 1986: Joan Lingard, Über die Barrikaden
- 1987: James Watson, Hinter vorgehaltener Hand
- 1988: Isolde Heyne, Sternschnuppenzeit
- 1989: Heidi Glade-Hassenmüller, Gute Nacht, Zuckerpüppchen
- 1990: Maria Seidemann, Rosalie
- 1991: Ursula Wölfel, Ein Haus für alle
- 1992: Mecka Lind, Manchmal gehört mir die ganze Welt
- 1993: Klaus Kordon, Der erste Frühling
- 1994: Katarina von Bredow, Ludvig meine Liebe
- 1995: Tonke Dragt, Turmhoch und meilenweit
- 1996: Jostein Gaarder, Durch einen Spiegel, in einem dunklen Wort (Through a Glass, Darkly)
- 1997: Ralf Isau, Das Museum der gestohlenen Erinnerungen
- 1998: Andreas Steinhöfel, Die Mitte der Welt
- 1999: John Marsden, Gegen jede Chance (Third Day, the Frost)
- 2000: Sherryl Jordan, Junipers Spiel
- 2001: David Grossman, Wohin du mich führst
- 2002: Hanna Jansen, Über tausend Hügel wandere ich mit dir
- 2003: Nancy Farmer, Das Skorpionenhaus (The House of the Scorpion)
- 2004: Rainer M. Schröder, Die Lagune der Galeeren
- 2005: Kevin Brooks, Lucas
- 2006: Stephenie Meyer, Bis(s) zum Morgengrauen (Twilight)
- 2007: Anne C. Voorhoeve, Liverpool Street
- 2008: Markus Zusak, Die Bücherdiebin (The Book Thief)
- 2009: Suzanne Collins, Die Tribute von Panem – Tödliche Spiele (The Hunger Games)
- 2010: Susan Beth Pfeffer, Die Welt, wie wir sie kannten
- 2011: Lauren Oliver, Delirium
- 2012: John Green, Das Schicksal ist ein mieser Verräter
- 2013: Christine Fehér, Dann mach ich eben Schluss
- 2014: David Safier, 28 Tage lang
- 2015: Victoria Aveyard, Die Farben des Blutes: Die rote Königin
- 2016: Tamara Ireland Stone, Mit anderen Worten: ich
- 2017: John Boyne, Der Junge auf dem Berg (The Boy at the Top of the Mountain)
- 2018: Amy Giles, Jetzt ist alles, was wir haben (Now Is Everything)
- 2019: Wendelin Van Draanen, Acht Wochen Wüste (Wild Bird)
- 2020: Alan Gratz, Vor uns das Meer. Drei Jugendliche, drei Jahrzehnte, eine Hoffnung (Refugee)
- 2021: Malene Sølvsten, Ansuz – Das Flüstern der Raben
- 2022: Jennifer Lynn Barnes, The Inheritance Games
- 2023: Anja Reumschüssel, Über den Dächern von Jerusalem
- 2024: Maja Nielsen, Der Tunnelbauer
