= Appelsinpiken =

2003 novel by Jostein Gaarder

The Orange Girl
- First edition (Norwegian)
- Author: Jostein Gaarder
- Original title: Appelsinpiken
- Translator: James Anderson
- Language: Norwegian
- Publisher: Aschehoug
- Publication date: 2003
- Publication place: Norway

The Orange Girl (Note: The original Norwegian title, appelsin, refers specifically to the fruit and not the colour.) (Norwegian: Appelsinpiken) is a 2003 novel by Jostein Gaarder, the Norwegian author of the best-selling Sophie's World. The novel was adapted into a film in 2009. The book had been translated into 43 languages as of 2010. Gaarder received the 2003 Riksmål Society Children's and Youth Book Award for the book.

== Plot overview ==
Georg Røed's father Jan Olav died when he was four years old. Eleven years later, Georg's grandmother finds letters addressed to Georg from Jan Olav, written before his death, along with a story titled "The Orange Girl."

As Georg soon discovers, "The Orange Girl" is not simply a story, but a riddle from the past that centres around an incident from his father's youth. In the story, it is revealed that Jan Olav had once boarded a tram and had taken notice of a beautiful girl who had been clutching a bag of oranges. When tram abruptly jolted, the girl's oranges were dispersed. Jan Olav attempted to collect the oranges, but found that the girl had already disembarked from the tram. The story is a request for his son to solve the mystery of the orange girl's identity.

Georg realizes that the "orange girl" was his mother, whom he is still living with. The story turns out to be his father telling him how he and his mother met, and then explains how horrible it was to find out he was dying. He ends the letter by asking Georg the question: if before you were born, you were given the choice to live and be very happy, but die young and have all of the happiness taken away, or to not live at all, what would you choose?

== Adaptations ==
In 2009, The Orange Girl was adapted into a film directed by Eva Dahr.
