= Chinese boxes =

Ornamental nested boxes

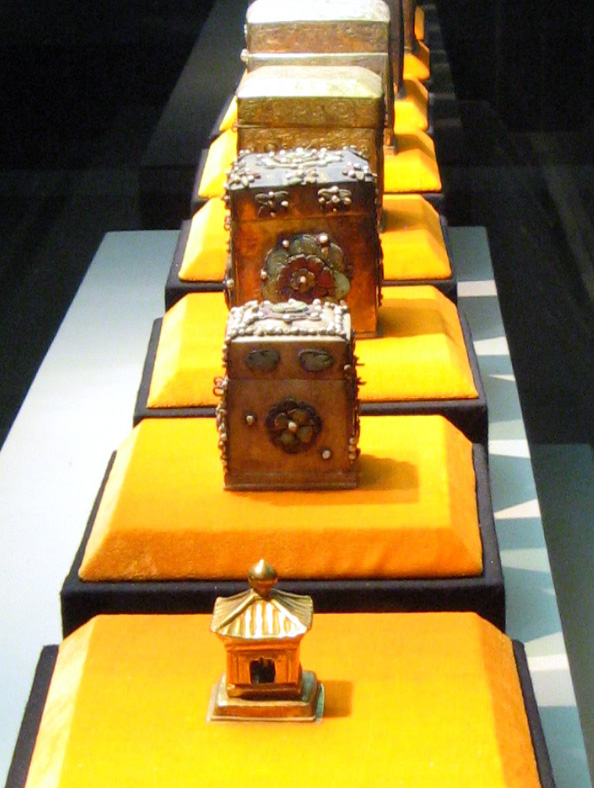
Nested Buddhist reliquary caskets from the Tang dynasty

Chinese boxes (Chinese: 套盒; pinyin: tàohé) are a set of boxes of graduated size, each fitting inside the next larger box.

A traditional style in Chinese design, nested boxes have proved a popular packaging option in the West for novelty or display reasons.

Chinese nested boxes have inspired similar forms of packaging around the world, but also have found use as a figurative description, providing an illustrative example to demonstrate situations of conceptually nested or recursive arrangements.

In literature, a Chinese box structure refers to a frame narrative, where a novel or drama is told in the form of a narrative inside a narrative (and so on), giving views from different perspectives. Examples include Plato's dialogue Symposium, Mary Shelley's 1818 novel Frankenstein, Jostein Gaarder's The Solitaire Mystery, Emily Brontë's Wuthering Heights, and Joseph Conrad's Heart of Darkness.

== See also ==
- Recursion
- Mise en abyme
- Matryoshka doll
- Infinity
