= Alan and Naomi (novel) =

1977 young adult novel by Myron Levoy

- Author: Myron Levoy
- Genre: Young adult literature
- Set in: New York City US
- Publisher: HarperCollins
- Publication date: 1977
- Media type: Book
- Pages: 192
- ISBN: 9780064402095
- OCLC: 247468037

Alan and Naomi is a 1977 young adult novel by Myron Levoy. The story takes place in 1944 and is about a friendship which develops between a Jewish New York boy and a refugee child from Nazi-occupied Paris. The book was adapted in 1992 into a movie of the same name.

== History ==
In 1977, Myron Levoy wrote Alan and Naomi, a novel which involved the complexity of traumatic memory. Alan Silverman, the titular protagonist, meets Naomi Kirshenbaum, whom he regards as crazy.

Written for young adults, the novel explores serious themes involving the Holocaust. It has been made into a 1992 movie with the same title, and into a play titled Secret Friends. The book was published throughout Asia and Europe.

== Plot ==
Set in 1944 New York City, the book is about a friendship that develops between twelve-year-old Alan Silverman and a French refugee of the Holocaust, Naomi. The themes in the novel involve antisemitism, trust and friendship. In Europe Naomi watched the Gestapo beat her father to death. She arrived in America in shock. She doesn't speak and hangs around in the stairwell of the apartment building, nervous, and compulsively tears paper into pieces. When Alan begins to understand about Naomi's terrifying experiences during World War II in France, he tries to befriend her; soon, Naomi starts to trust him. He learns that Naomi is smart, fun to be friends with, but has been scarred by the war.

Naomi reveals that her father fought for the French Resistance and made maps to assist them. Naomi blames herself for his death because she was unable to tear up the maps. She needs to be institutionalized after an event triggers her memory, and she relapses. The novel concludes with Alan crying because he feels he has failed Naomi and tearing up his paper airplane.

== Reception ==
The book was a National Book Award for Fiction finalist and won several awards in Germany, Austria and the Netherlands. In the book Melancholia and Maturation Eric L. Tribunella describes the novel as "one of the starkest representations of trauma and traumatic loss". In the book The Jewish Holocaust the authors state, "There are many funny as well as serious moments as the girl (Naomi) recovers. Well written and readable". The Interracial Books for Children Bulletin called it a "serious and disturbing book".
