= Chinese box =

Chinese box may refer to different topics:

- Chinese boxes, may refer to nested ornamental boxes; this usage is frequently as a metaphor for many layers of encapsulation, similar to Matryoshka dolls or the layers of an onion
- "Chinese box" is a common name for the plant Murraya paniculata (syn. Murraya exotica)
- Chinese Box, a 1997 Trimark film by Wayne Wang
- "Chinese Box", an episode of the TV series Numb3rs

== See also ==
- Chinese room
