= Mehrdad Bazyari =

- Born: 1961 (age 64–65) shiraz
- Citizenship: iranian
- Occupation: translator

Mehrdad Bazyari (born 1961 in Shiraz) is an Iranian translator, writer, and engineer, known for his direct translations of literary works from Norwegian, Danish, Swedish, and English into Persian. He won the Book of the Year Award of the Islamic Republic of Iran and the Seasonal Book Award for translating The Orange Girl by Jostein Gaarder, and he received the Gamanezan Award for translating Flowers for Algernon by Daniel Keyes

== Resources ==
- Noor Magazine, Bazyari bibliography
- Hermes Publications, Mehrdad Bazyari
- Hoopa Books, Mehrdad Bazyari
