= The Orange Girl =

2009 Norwegian film

Appelsinpiken
- Norwegian theatrical release poster
- Directed by: Eva Dahr
- Screenplay by: Axel Helgeland
- Based on: Appelsinpiken by Jostein Gaarder
- Produced by: Axel Helgeland
- Starring: Annie Dahr Nygaard; Mikkel Bratt Silset; Harald Thompson Rosenstrøm; Emilie K. Beck; Rebekka Karijord
- Cinematography: Harald Gunnar Paalgard
- Edited by: Per-Erik Eriksen
- Music by: Shaun Bartlett, Magnus Beite and Pablo Cervantes
- Distributed by: Sandrew Metronome
- Release date: 27 February 2009
- Country: Norway
- Language: Norwegian

The Orange Girl (Appelsinpiken) is a Norwegian film released in February 2009. It is based on a book by author Jostein Gaarder; a book translated to 43 languages. In addition to the Norwegian production company Sandrew Metronome, the German company Tradewind Pictures and the Spanish Jaleo Films are also part of the project.

== Plot ==
The film is based on a 2003 novel by the same name, written by Norwegian author Jostein Gaarder. The main character is the young boy Georg who one day finds a long letter from his deceased father in his old red stroller. The letter tells, among other things, about the father's youthful love for the mysterious "orange girl" (appelsinpiken), and leaves a mystery for Georg to solve. The story leaps back and forth between the father's letters to the future, the young boy's thoughts and the events of the father's life.

== Reception ==
The newspaper Verdens Gang gave the film four out of six points. The reviewer, Jon Selås, found the film had succeeded in tying together several different story lines in a convincing manner. At the same time he did not think the flow of the dialogue was entirely natural. Among the actors he was most impressed by Annie Dahr Nygaard's effort.
