= Heidi Hassenmüller =

German journalist and author (1941–2020)

- Born: 1941; Hamburg, Germany
- Died: 28 October 2020 (aged 78–79); Netherlands
- Occupation: Writer
- Children: 4
- Writing career
- Language: German
- Genre: Young adult literature
- Notable works: Gute Nacht, Zuckerpüppchen
- Notable awards: 1989 Buxtehude Bull
- Website: Official website

Heidi Hassenmüller (1941–2020) was a German journalist and author who wrote young adult literature. In 1989 she was awarded the Buxtehude Bull award for her book Gute Nacht, Zuckerpüppchen.

Hassenmüller was born in Hamburg in 1941 and moved with her family to the Netherlands in 1974. She died in the Netherlands on 28 October 2020.

== Works ==
- Jochen zieht nach Holland. Jugend und Volk, Wien 1985, ISBN 3-224-11279-4.
- Linda beisst sich durch. Echter, Würzburg 1986, ISBN 3-429-00994-4.
- Kinderwagen zu verschenken. HPP, Velp 1989, ISBN 90-800257-1-2.
- Gute Nacht, Zuckerpüppchen. Bitter, Recklinghausen 1989, ISBN 3-7903-0372-0.
- Andrea, ein Star will ich werden. Bitter, Recklinghausen 1990, ISBN 3-7903-0398-4.
- Ein Sonntag im September. Bitter, Recklinghausen 1991, ISBN 3-7903-0410-7.
- Zuckerpüppchen – was danach geschah. Bitter, Recklinghausen 1992, ISBN 3-7903-0474-3.
- Ein Tabu wird abgebaut. Bitter, Recklinghausen 1993, ISBN 3-7903-0484-0.
- Désirée, zwei Brüder Schlaf und Tod. Bitter, Recklinghausen 1994, ISBN 3-7903-0514-6.
- Die Kehrseite der Medaille. Bitter, Recklinghausen 1995, ISBN 3-7903-0528-6.
- Momentaufnahmen einer Urlaubsreise. Bitter, Recklinghausen 1996, ISBN 3-7903-0554-5.
- Warten auf Michelle. Lübbe, Bergisch Gladbach 1996, ISBN 3-404-16153-X.
- Das verstummte Lachen. Lübbe, Bergisch Gladbach 1996, ISBN 3-404-50506-9.
- Tango tanzt man nicht mit Tulpen. Lübbe, Bergisch Gladbach 1998, ISBN 3-404-16179-3.
- Warum gerade mein Kind? Patmos, Düsseldorf 1998, ISBN 3-491-72383-3.
- Gefährliche Freunde. Ellermann, Hamburg 1998, ISBN 3-7707-3069-0.
- Kein Beinbruch. Ellermann, Hamburg 1999, ISBN 3-7707-3081-X.
- Spiel ohne Gnade. Ellermann, Hamburg 1999, ISBN 3-7707-3093-3.
- Majas Macht. Ellermann, Hamburg 2001, ISBN 3-7707-3135-2.
- Schwarz, rot, tot. Klopp, Hamburg 2004, ISBN 3-7817-0767-9.
- Kein Engel weit und breit. Klopp, Hamburg 2005, ISBN 3-7817-0769-5.
- Schnauze voll. Klopp, Hamburg 2006, ISBN 3-7817-0770-9.
- Schrecklich Schön. Klopp, Hamburg 2007, ISBN 978-3-7817-0771-9.
- Superstar – Intrigen backstage. Klopp, Hamburg 2008, ISBN 978-3-7817-0772-6.
- Falsche Liebe. Klopp, Hamburg 2009, ISBN 978-3-7817-0774-0.
- Gegen meinen Willen. Klopp, Hamburg 2010, ISBN 978-3-7817-0775-7.
