= Ralf Isau =

German author (born 1956)

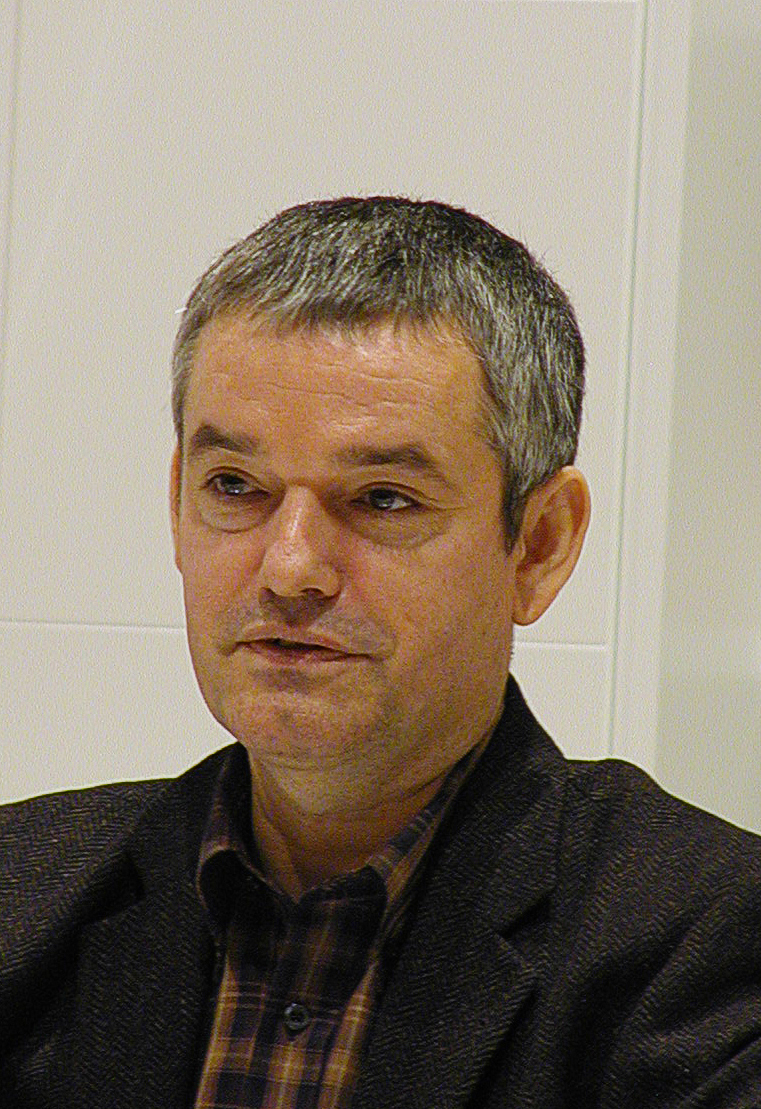
- Isau in 2005
- Born: 2 March 1956 (age 70)
- Occupation: Novelist
- Writing career
- Language: German
- Genre: Fantasy

Ralf Isau (born 2 March 1956, in Berlin) is a German author of fantasy novels, often archaeology-themed.

== Career ==
He received the 1997 Buxtehuder Bulle for his novels Das Museum der gestohlenen Erinnerungen and Das Netz der Schattenspiele.

Isau formerly worked as an IT consultant. He lives in Stuttgart, is married and has a daughter.

== Bibliography ==
- Der Drache Gertrud. 1994, ISBN 3-522-17358-9
- Das Museum der gestohlenen Erinnerungen. 1997, ISBN 3-522-17579-4
- Das Echo der Flüsterer. 1998, ISBN 3-522-17193-4
- Das Netz der Schattenspiele. 1999, ISBN 3-522-17257-4
- Pala und die seltsame Verflüchtigung der Worte. 2002, ISBN 3-522-17432-1
- Der Silberne Sinn. 2003, ISBN 3-404-15234-4
- Die unsichtbare Pyramide. 2003, ISBN 3-522-17594-8
- Die geheime Bibliothek des Thaddäus Tillmann Trutz. 2003, ISBN 3-426-19642-5
- Der Leuchtturm in der Wüste. 2004, ISBN 3-522-17663-4
- Der Herr der Unruhe. 2004, ISBN 3-431-03392-X
- Die Galerie der Lügen. 2005, ISBN 3-431-03636-8
- Die Dunklen. 2007, ISBN 3-492-70139-6
- Minik – An den Quellen der Nacht. 2008, ISBN 3-522-17873-4
- Der Mann, der nichts vergessen konnte. 2008, ISBN 3-492-70141-8
- Metropoly. 2008, ISBN 978-3-522-18088-7
- Der Tränenpalast. 2008, ISBN 978-3-522-18087-0
- Der Schattendieb. 2009, ISBN 978-3-522-20029-5

=== Neschan-Trilogie ===
- Die Träume des Jonathan Jabbok. 1995, ISBN 3-522-16896-8
- Das Geheimnis des siebten Richters. 1996, ISBN 3-522-16901-8
- Das Lied der Befreiung Neschans. 1996, ISBN 3-522-16945-X

=== Der Kreis der Dämmerung ===
- Der Kreis der Dämmerung – Teil 1. 1999, ISBN 3-522-17306-6
- Der Kreis der Dämmerung – Teil 2. 2000, ISBN 3-522-17335-X
- Der Kreis der Dämmerung – Teil 3. 2001, ISBN 3-522-17401-1
- Der Kreis der Dämmerung – Teil 4. 2001, ISBN 3-522-17474-7

=== Die Chroniken von Mirad ===
- Das gespiegelte Herz. 2005, ISBN 3-522-17745-2
- Der König im König. 2006, ISBN 3-522-17746-0
- Das Wasser von Silmao. 2006, ISBN 3-522-17747-9
