= Rainer M. Schröder =

German writer (born 1951)

Rainer Maria Schröder (born 3 January 1951 in Rostock) is a German author known for adventure fiction for juveniles, mystery thrillers, and historical novels for adults. He also writes under the pseudonyms Ashley Carrington and Raymond M. Sheridan.

Schröder's books have sold over six million copies to date. In 1988, he received the Friedrich-Gerstäcker-Preis for his historical novel Abby Lynn – Verbannt ans Ende der Welt. A decade later, the Federal Agency for Civic Education named his novel Unter dem Jacarandabaum one of the "100 Novels Most Worth Reading" of 20th-century world literature. That same year, he was awarded the 3rd International Eifel-Literaturpreis for Das Geheimnis der weißen Mönche. In 2003, his novel Das Geheimnis des Kartenmachers earned both the Literature Award from the Youth Book Jury Moers and the distinction of "Book of the Month" by the Youth Book Committee Göttingen. He received the prestigious Buxtehude Bull youth literature award in 2005 for Die Lagune der Galeeren.

Schröder's works have been translated into more than a dozen languages, including French, Portuguese, Spanish, Italian, Polish, Turkish, Czech, Slovak, Latvian, Dutch, Japanese, and Russian.

== Biography ==
=== Early life and education ===
Rainer Maria Schröder grew up in East Berlin. Shortly before the construction of the Berlin Wall, he fled to West Germany with his family, where they initially lived in a refugee camp. The family later relocated to Dortmund and Düsseldorf, where Schröder completed his Abitur (secondary school diploma) and studied opera singing. During this period, he played guitar in the rock band Union Jack.

=== Career ===
At his father’s urging—a former head physician at Berlin's Charité hospital—Schröder pursued an academic path. After completing a two-year officer training program in the German Air Force, he worked as a trainee journalist for the newspaper Rheinische Post. In 1974, he enrolled at the University of Cologne to study law, while also pursuing courses in German philology, theater studies, and film and television studies. Concurrently, he wrote articles for various newspapers and the broadcasting station WDR.

Schröder abandoned his academic career in 1975 after Franz Schneider Verlag purchased his debut juvenile novel, In die Falle gelaufen. He subsequently published works with Franz Schneider Verlag, Stalling, and Heyne Verlag. In 1977, he debuted as a playwright. After a nine-month stint as an editor, Schröder transitioned to full-time writing.

=== Personal life and travels ===
In 1980, Schröder and his wife, Helga, moved to a farm in Smith Mountain Lake, Virginia. An avid traveler, he often gathers research for his adventure novels. He currently resides in Palm Coast, Florida.

=== Literary works ===
Schröder's novels frequently explore historical settings between the 12th and 19th centuries, exemplified by works such as Das Geheimnis des Kartenmachers, Das Vermächtnis des alten Pilgers, and Das Kloster der Ketzer. Exceptions include novels set during World War II, like Die lange Reise des Jakob Stern, and his foray into science-fiction with the two-part novel Liberty 9. He also authored the Kommissar Klicker series, released as both juvenile books and audiobooks.

=== Non-fiction and music ===
Schröder has written non-fiction works on music, including a 1980 biography of the band Scorpions, published by Heyne Verlag. A longtime friend of the band, he accompanied them on tours across France, England, and California, and spent extensive time in their recording studio.

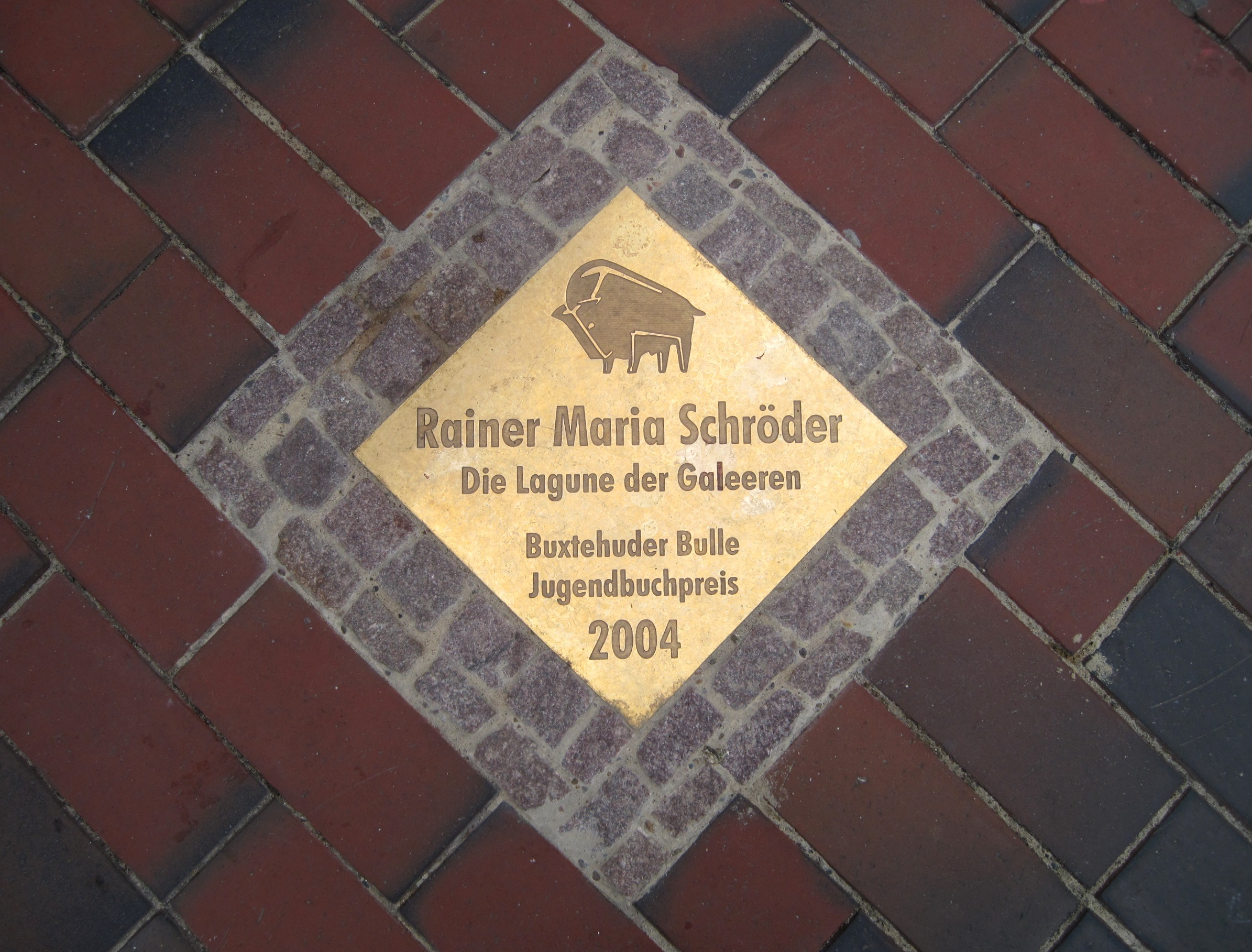
Buxtehude Bull

== Awards ==
- 1984: Silbernes Schneider-Buch (Franz Schneider Verlag)
- 1988: Friedrich-Gerstäcker-Preis for Abby Lynn – Verbannt ans Ende der Welt
- 1993: Goldenes Schneider-Buch (Franz Schneider Verlag)
- 1998: 3rd International Eifel-Literaturpreis for Das Geheimnis der weißen Mönche
- 1998: Book of the Month Prize (Deutsche Akademie für Kinder- und Jugendbücher) for Mein Feuer brennt im Land der fallenden Wasser
- 1999: JuBu Buch des Monats for Felix Faber – Übers Meer und durch die Wildnis
- 2003: Moerser Jugendbuchpreis for Das Geheimnis des Kartenmachers
- 2003: Book of the Month Prize (Arbeitsgemeinschaft Jugendbuch Göttingen) for Das Geheimnis des Kartenmachers
- 2004: Buxtehuder Bulle for Die Lagune der Galeeren
- 2016: Spandauer Jugendliteraturpreis for Himmel ohne Sterne

== Bibliography ==
=== As Rainer M. Schröder ===
==== Book series ====
- Kommissar Klicker (10 volumes)
- Privatdetektiv Mike McCoy (3 volumes)
- Unheimliche Gegner (Science-Fiction-juvenile book-series)
  - Unheimliche Gegner der vierten Art – Kampf im UFO – 1978
  - Unheimliche Gegner der fünften Art – Das Andromeda-Rätsel – 1979
  - Unheimliche Gegner der sechsten Art – Die Sternenfalle – 1979
- Pizzabande (with other authors)
  - Pfeffer für Pistazien-Paule oder Die Extratour – 1986
  - Der Köder mit den sanften Pfoten oder Der Verdacht – 1991
  - Vampire kauen keine Knoblauchzehen oder Der Kapuzenmann – 1993
  - Die geköpfte Göttin oder Raub um Mitternacht – 1994
- Abby Lynn-Saga
  - Verbannt ans Ende der Welt – 1987
  - Verschollen in der Wildnis – 1993
  - Verraten und verfolgt – 2001
  - Verborgen im Niemandsland – 2004
  - Verlorenes Paradies – 2014
- Die Falken-Saga
  - Im Zeichen des Falken – 1989
  - Auf der Spur des Falken – 1990
  - Im Banne des Falken – 1991
  - Im Tal des Falken – 1992
- Felix Faber
  - Die wahrhaftigen Abenteuer des Felix Faber – 1997
  - Felix Faber – Übers Meer und durch die Wildnis – 1998
- Die Bruderschaft vom Heiligen Gral
  - Der Fall von Akkon -2006
  - Das Amulett der Wüstenkrieger – 2006
  - Das Labyrinth der Schwarzen Abtei – Juli 2007
- Die Medici-Chroniken
  - Hüter der Macht – Februar 2010
  - Der Pate von Florenz – Juli 2010
  - Das Erbe des Clans – August 2011
- Liberty 9
  - Liberty 9 – Sicherheitszone: Volume 1 of The Liberty 9 Series (English: Liberty 9 – security zone, Publisher cbj- 2012)
  - Liberty 9 – Todeszone – 2013
- Pater Angelico-Trilogie
  - Die Farben von Florenz: Pater Angelicos erster Fall – 2012
  - Der Todesengel von Florenz: Pater Angelicos neuer Fall – 2013
  - Die Blutmesse von Florenz: Pater Angelicos neuer Fall – 2014

==== Individual works ====
- Goldrausch in Kalifornien – 1979
- Sir Francis Drake – Pirat der Sieben Meere – 1980
- Dschingis Khan – König der Steppe – 1981
- Die letzte Fahrt des Captain Kidd – 1981
- Entdecker, Forscher, Abenteurer – 1992
- Die Irrfahrten des David Cooper – 1992
- Die wundersame Weltreise des Jonathan Blum – 1995
- Das Geheimnis der weißen Mönche – 1996
- Mein Feuer brennt im Land der Fallenden Wasser – 1998
- Unter Schatzsuchern, Goldgräbern und Alligatoren – 1999
- Das Vermächtnis des alten Pilgers – 1999
- Das geheime Wissen des Alchimisten – 2000
- Der Schatz der Santa Maravilla – 2000
- Das unsichtbare Siegel – 2001
- Das verschwundene Testament der Alice Shadwell – 2001
- Das Geheimnis des Kartenmachers – 2002
- Die geteilten Brüggemans – 2002
- Rotes Kap der Abenteuer – 2002
- Insel der Gefahren – 2003
- Die lange Reise des Jakob Stern – 2003
- Jäger des weißen Goldes – 2003
- Die Lagune der Galeeren – 2004
- Der geheime Auftrag des Jona von Judäa – 2005
- Das Kloster der Ketzer – 2005
- Land des Feuers, Land der Sehnsucht – 2005
- Becky Brown- Versprich, nach mir zu suchen! – 2007
- Die Judaspapiere – Juni 2008
- Tage der Finsternis – Juli 2009

=== Pseudonym Ashley Carrington ===
==== Book series ====
- Jessica-Reihe
  - Jessica oder Die Irrwege der Liebe – 1984
  - Jessica oder Das Ziel aller Sehnsucht – 1987
  - Jessica oder in der Ferne lockt das Glück – 1987
  - Jessica oder was bleibt, ist die Hoffnung – 1988
  - Jessica oder die Insel der verlorenen Liebe – 1989
  - Jessica oder die Sehnsucht im Morgenrot – 1989
  - Jessica oder unter dem Kreuz des Südens – 1990
  - Jessica oder im Sturmwind der Leidenschaft – 1990
  - Jessica oder Alles Glück hat seinen Preis – 1992
  - Jessica oder Die Liebe endet nie – 1992
- Valerie-Reihe
  - Valerie, Erbin von Cotton Fields – 1987
  - Valerie, Herrin auf Cotton Fields – 1987
  - Valerie – Wolken über Cotton Fields – 1989
  - Valerie – gefangen auf Cotton Fields – 1989
  - Valerie – Flammen über Cotton Fields – 1990
  - Valerie – Rückkehr nach Cotton Fields – 1991
- Éanna-Reihe
  - Wildes Herz – 2007
  - Stürmische See (Küste der Sehnsucht) – 2008
  - Ein neues Anfang (Unbekanntes Land) – 2009
  - Verheißenes Land (Traum vom Glück) – 2012

==== Individual works ====
- Hickory Hill – Das Vermächtnis der Alice Shadwell – 1990
- Fluß der Träume – 1990
- Belmont Park – 1991
- Die Herren der Küste – 1992
- Die Gefangene der Sonneninsel und andere Geschichten – 1992
- Küste der Verheißung – 1993
- Verlockendes Land – 1993
- Blut und Diamanten – 1994 (2007 New edition Im Rausch der Diamanten as Rainer M. Schröder)
- Jahreszeiten der Liebe – 1994
- Der Sohn des Muschelhändlers – 1995
- Die Rose von Kimberley – 1996
- Unter dem Jacarandabaum – 1997

=== Audiobooks ===
- Abby Lynn. Verbannt ans Ende der Welt, Der Hörverlag, ISBN 978-3-89940-232-2
- Abby Lynn. Verraten und verfolgt, Der Hörverlag, ISBN 978-3-89940-536-1
- Abby Lynn. Verschollen in der Wildnis, Der Hörverlag, ISBN 978-3-89940-326-8
- Das Geheimnis der weißen Mönche, Der Hörverlag, ISBN 978-3-89940-095-3
- Das Geheimnis des Kartenmachers, Der Hörverlag, ISBN 978-3-89940-412-8
- Das Vermächtnis des alten Pilgers, Der Hörverlag, ISBN 978-3-89940-020-5
- Die Bruderschaft vom Heiligen Gral. Das Amulett der Wüstenkrieger, Goya libre, Hamburg 2007, ISBN 978-3-8337-1778-9
- Die Bruderschaft vom Heiligen Gral. Das Labyrinth der schwarzen Abtei, Goya libre, Hamburg 2008, ISBN 978-3-8337-2125-0
- Die Bruderschaft vom Heiligen Gral. Der Fall von Akkon, Goya libre, Hamburg 2006, ISBN 978-3-8337-1685-0
- Die Judaspapiere, Der Hörverlag, ISBN 978-3-86717-361-2
- Die Lagune der Galeeren, Goya libre, Hamburg 2007, ISBN 978-3-8337-2002-4
- Die Medici-Chroniken 1. Hüter der Macht, Goya libre, Hamburg 2010, ISBN 978-3-8337-2592-0
- Die Medici-Chroniken 2. Der Pate von Florenz, Goya libre, Hamburg 2010, ISBN 978-3-8337-2610-1
- Tage der Finsternis, Goya libre, Hamburg 2009, ISBN 978-3-8337-2479-4
