= Myron Levoy =

American children's and YA author (1930–2019)

- Born: January 30, 1930; Queens, New York City, US
- Died: December 30, 2019 (aged 89)
- Education: MSc
- Alma mater: Purdue University
- Occupation: Author
- Spouse: Beatrice Fleicher
- Children: 2
- Writing career
- Years active: 1968–2000
- Genres: Children's literature; Young adult literature
- Notable work: Alan and Naomi (novel)
- Notable awards: Buxtehuder Bulle 1981

Myron M. Levoy (January 30, 1930 – December 30, 2019) was an American author of children's and young adults literature. After graduating from Purdue University he worked as a chemical engineer and was involved in the field of space engineering before becoming a full-time author.

== Early life ==
Myron Levoy was born January 30, 1930. He grew up in the borough of Queens, New York City. His mother, Elsie Schwartz, was Hungarian, and his father, Bernard Levoy was a Jewish immigrant from Hanover. He grew up on 97th Street in Queens with his mother, father, and his older brother, Louis.

Levoy's exposure to the world of literature began early in his childhood. Writing about his youth, he talked about frequently being taken to the local library with his family, and strongly recalled the "smell and feel of books". While at junior high school, Levoy also took part in a choral speaking class, which made him realize that "words alone, without music, can sing" and further kindled his love of writing.

He would later go on to study engineering first at City College of New York and then at Purdue University.

== Career ==
After graduating from Purdue University with an M.Sc., Levoy started working as a chemical engineer and was also involved in the field of space engineering before becoming a full-time author.

During his aeronautical career, Levoy worked on various projects and ended up with Reaction Motor Division's nuclear technology group, where his most notable work involved research on concepts for a crewed space mission to Mars. A 1958 study on that subject, developed together with John Newgard, proposed utilizing a 150-foot (46 m) long and 15-foot (4.6 m) wide, nuclear-powered spaceship for that mission. In conjunction with that subject, he also authored a paper for the American Institute of Aeronautics and Astronautics on hybrid electrical-nuclear engines.

Levoy began writing his first own stories while still at elementary school. He continued writing small stories and poems during high school, and also became the editor of the poetry column of his school's student newspaper. Even though he initially pursued a technical career in engineering, he also continued his writing, with various poems and short stories being published in a number of literary magazines. His early work also included a number of plays which were produced on stage in New York at that time. His first full-length novel, as well as his only novel for adults, A Necktie in Greenwich Village, was published in 1968.

His move into full-time writing came about a few years later after he started writing short stories for his two children, which were then expanded and collected into his first book for children, The Witch of Fourth Street (and Other Stories), which tells the tales of immigrant neighborhoods of New York during the 1920s, paralleling Levoy's own childhood growing up as a first-generation American. Due to the success of that book, he retired from engineering and concentrated on writing mainly books for children and young adults.

His young adults novels, in which outsiders and otherwise socially marginalized characters were often at the center of the plot, are not only directed against prejudice and racism, but also describe the challenges of finding one's identity and standing up for oneself. A multicultural context also often underlies his books, extending to his stories for children, too, which e.g. variously deal with the issues faced by immigrants, or the particularities of Jewish culture.

Levoy was actively involved in the American peace movement and also participated with his family in the anti-nuclear protests during the Cold War, in New York City in June 1982. He published poetry, plays, a novel, several short stories for children, a picture book, and six books for young adults. At the respective time of their publication, all of his children's stories and young adult novels received largely favorable reviews, including by The New York Times Book Review and The Horn Book Magazine.

== Awards and honors ==
- Book World's Children's Spring Book Festival honor book 1972 for The Witch of Fourth Street
- Finalist of Jane Addams Children's Book Award 1978 for Alan and Naomi
- Boston Globe–Horn Book Award 1978 honor list for Alan and Naomi
- Finalist at the National Book Award 1980 for Alan and Naomi
- Zilveren Griffel 1981 for Alan and Naomi
- Buxtehuder Bulle 1981 for Alan and Naomi
- Österreichischer Staatspreis für Kinder- und Jugendliteratur 1981 for Alan and Naomi
- Deutscher Jugendliteraturpreis 1982 for Alan and Naomi
- Preis der Leseratten 1982 for Alan and Naomi

== Legacy ==
Levoy's most successful book, Alan and Naomi, was adapted into a film of the same name, a play and was translated into ten languages. His children's and young adults literature works were especially popular in Germany, where Alan and Naomi received several prizes and was frequently taught in schools up until at least the 2010s; all but one of his books following Alan and Naomi were translated into German, making it the language with the largest count of Levoy's translated works.

In 2013, it was announced that American actor Johnny Depp was considering pursuing the creation of a film based on Levoy's book The Magic Hat of Mortimer Wintergreen, with a script being proposed by English screenwriter Jack Thorne. As of January 2023, no further details or updates have been revealed. It is not clear if any project is still in consideration.

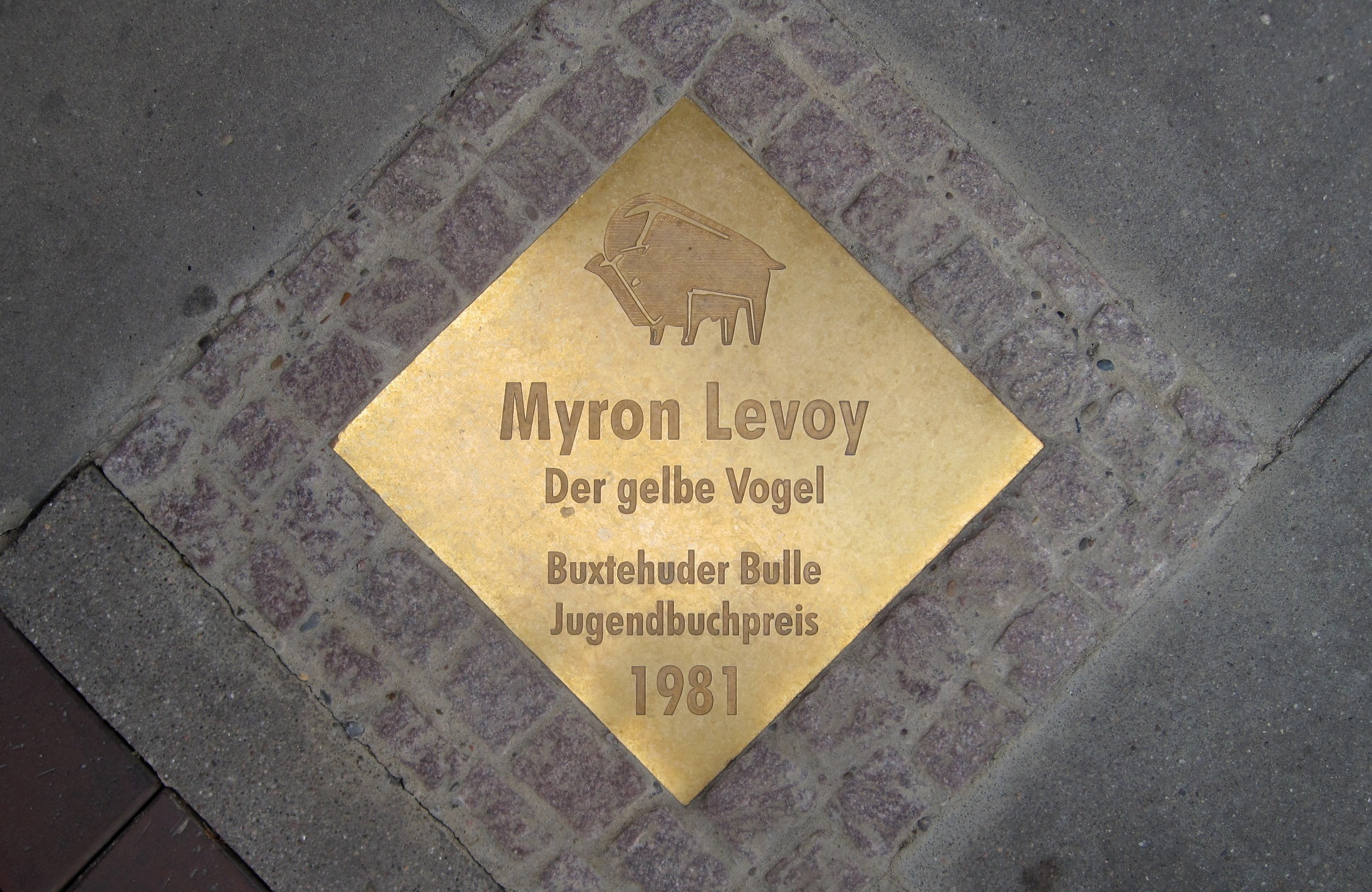
Buxtehude Bull: Brass plaque commemorating Levoy

== Personal life ==
In 1952, Levoy married Beatrice (née) Fleicher, with whom he would have two children. The family lived in Rockaway, New Jersey.

== Bibliography ==
- 1968: A Necktie in Greenwich Village
- 1971: The Witch of Fourth Street and Other Stories
- 1972: Penny Tunes and Princesses (with illustrations by Ezra Jack Keats)
- 1977: Alan and Naomi
- 1981: A Shadow Like a Leopard
- 1984: Three Friends
- 1984: The Hanukkah of Great-Uncle Otto
- 1986: Pictures of Adam
- 1988: The Magic Hat of Mortimer Wintergreen
- 1992: Kelly 'n' me
- 2000: The Year of Nelly Bates (only published in a German translation as Eine Liebe in Schwarz-Weiß)
