= The Ringmaster's Daughter =

2001 novel by Jostein Gaarder

- First edition (Norwegian)
- Author: Jostein Gaarder
- Original title: Sirkusdirektørens datter
- Language: Norwegian
- Publisher: Aschehoug
- Publication date: 2001
- Publication place: Norway

The Ringmaster's Daughter (Sirkusdirektørens datter in the original Norwegian) is a novel by Jostein Gaarder, published in 2001. It was originally written in Norwegian, but has since been translated into English (2002).

== Plot ==
The novel uses a frequent Gaarder device of telling a story within a story. It is narrated by a Norwegian named Petter, who recounts his life since childhood. Petter grows up with a single mother and had few friends, although he does possess an overly-imaginative mind. As an adult Petter sells ideas, stories, and plots to frustrated writers, and soon expands to include clients across Europe. In the meantime Petter meets and falls in love with a woman named Maria. Maria tells him that she is leaving for Stockholm and that they must never see each other again, but first asks Petter to father her child.

Eventually writers and members of the publishing industry become suspicious, and rumors spread of a "Spider" who sells ideas to everyone. At a publishing convention in Bologna, Petter is warned that his life may be in danger, so he takes the first flight out. Going into hiding, Petter arrives on the Amalfi Coast, where he falls in love with a woman named Beate. Both are initially secretive about their pasts, but as Petter begins to tell Beate some of his stories, Beate gets angry and disgusted, telling him that she will only see him once more on the following day. During the night Petter dawns on the realization that Beate must have heard the same stories from her mother, Maria, thereby making him Beate's father.

== Editions ==
- Gaarder, Jostein. The Ringmaster's Daughter. London: Orion Publishing Group, Limited, March 1, 2006. ISBN 0-7538-1700-4
