= Male Homosexuality in Children's Literature, 1867–1918 =

2023 nonfiction book

Male Homosexuality in Children’s Literature, 1867–1918: The Young Uranians
- Author: Eric L. Tribunella
- Language: English
- Publisher: Routledge
- Publication date: 2023
- ISBN: 978-1000898736

Male Homosexuality in Children's Literature, 1867–1918: The Young Uranians is a history book written by Eric L. Tribunella and published by Routledge in 2023.
