= Through a Glass, Darkly (Gaarder novel) =

1993 novel by Jostein Gaarder

- First edition (Norwegian)
- Author: Jostein Gaarder
- Original title: I et speil, i en gåte (In a mirror, in a riddle)
- Language: Norwegian
- Genre: young adult, philosophy
- Publisher: Aschehoug
- Publication date: 1993
- Publication place: Norway

Through A Glass, Darkly (original Norwegian title: I et speil, i en gåte) is a novel by Norwegian author Jostein Gaarder published in 1993. An award-winning film adaptation was released in 2008. The title is a phrase from the First Epistle to the Corinthians, one of the epistles by Paul the Apostle.

== Plot ==
The book describes a series of conversations between Cecilia, a girl lying ill in bed with terminal cancer, and Ariel, an angel who stepped in through her window, on the meaning of life.

== Prizes ==
The book won the author the Norwegian Booksellers' Prize for 1993, and has sold more than two million copies worldwide. In 1996, a German translation Durch einen Spiegel, in einem dunklen Wort won the Buxtehude Bull award for youth literature.

== Film ==
The book was adapted to the screen by director Jesper W. Nielsen in 2008, entitled, like the book, I et speil, i en gåte. Marie Haagenrud played the leading character, Cecilia, and Aksel Hennie played the angel Ariel. The film won the Amanda Award for the best children's film for 2009.
