= Malene Sølvsten =

Danish author (1977–2024)

- Born: 1977; Brønderslev, Denmark
- Died: 20 October 2024 (aged 47)
- Education: Copenhagen Business School

Malene Sølvsten (1977 – 20 October 2024) was a Danish author of young adult fantasy books.

== Life and career ==
Sølvsten was born in 1977. She had a master's degree in International Finance and Business from Copenhagen Business School (2010).

Sølvsten's first book, Ravnenes Hvisken (Whisper of the Ravens), was published in 2016. This later became the name of the entire trilogy, this first volume being renamed to Ansuz. That same year it was nominated for the Danish reader's book award (Læsernes Bogpris), and in 2017 won the Orla award for 'Best immersion'. It became so popular, that she decided to resign her position in the Danish Agency for Digitisation in order to focus entirely on writing. She remained a full-time author until her death in 2024.

She received several awards for her authorship in Denmark and abroad, including the prestigious German Buxtehude Bull award.

Sølvsten died on 20 October 2024, at the age of 47.
