= The Christmas Mystery =

1992 novel by Jostein Gaarder

- First edition
- Author: Jostein Gaarder
- Original title: Julemysteriet
- Language: Norwegian
- Genre: Fantasy
- Publication date: 1992
- Publication place: Norway
- Media type: Print (hardback and paperback)

The Christmas Mystery (Norwegian: Julemysteriet) is a 1992 Norwegian novel for children by Jostein Gaarder. The story has one chapter for each day of Advent.

== Story ==
Using the device of a "Story within a story", a young boy, Joachim, reads a story hidden behind each window in an advent calendar that he bought on November 30; every day, he finds small piece of paper from the doors of the calendar that tells the story of Elisabet Hansen, who chases a toy lamb that has come to life from an Oslo department store. The story within the advent calendar follows Elisabet as, with the angel Ephiriel and an increasing host of other characters, she crosses Europe whilst also travelling backwards in time towards Bethlehem to see the Christ-child. They meet other pilgrims which join the journey, including the shepherds Joshua and Jacob, the three wise kings, and several sheep.

As Joachim opens more doors on the calendar, he and his family try to find out about the mysterious flower seller, John, who appears to have made the calendar, and about Elisabet Hansen, a girl who disappeared in Norway many years earlier. Adding to the mystery is a photograph taken in Rome of a young woman, on the back of the photograph John has written 'Elisabet', is she the same Elisabet?

== See also ==
- List of Christmas-themed literature
