= Vita Brevis: A Letter to St Augustine =

1996 novel by Jostein Gaarder

- First edition (Norwegian)
- Author: Jostein Gaarder
- Language: Norwegian
- Publisher: Aschehoug
- Publication place: Norway
- Media type: Print

Vita Brevis: A Letter to St Augustine (Latin: Brief Life; also published in English as That Same Flower) is a novel written by the Norwegian author Jostein Gaarder and originally published in 1996. Gaarder presents the text as written by Saint Augustine's lover (who is mentioned, but not named, in his Confessions).

== Plot ==
In the introduction, Gaarder claims that he found the old manuscript at a bookshop in Buenos Aires and translated it. According to his plotline, it was written by Floria Aemilia, Augustine's concubine, who after being abandoned by him, got a thorough Classical education, read his Confessions (where she is mentioned but not named, unlike their son, Adeodatus) and felt compelled to write this text as an answer.

== Editions ==
- Gaarder, Jostein. Vita Brevis (Brief Life) (also appeared in English as That Same Flower) (1996) ISBN 0-7538-0461-1

== See also ==
- Ars longa, vita brevis
