= Alan & Naomi =

- U.S. videocassette cover
- Directed by: Sterling Van Wagenen
- Written by: Myron Levoy; Jordan Horowitz
- Based on: Alan & Naomi by Myron Levoy
- Starring: Lukas Haas; Vanessa Zaoui
- Production company: Leucadia Film Corporation
- Distributed by: Leucadia Film Corporation (original release); PorchLight Entertainment
- Release date: January 31, 1992
- Running time: 96 minutes
- Country: United States
- Language: English
- Budget: under US$3 million

Alan & Naomi is a 1992 film about the friendship between two children in 1944 Brooklyn. Lukas Haas and Vanessa Zaoui star as the title characters, and the screenplay is based on a 1977 novel of the same name by Myron Levoy.

== Premise ==
After urging from his parents, 14-year-old Alan Silverman (Haas) develops an emotional friendship with Naomi Kirshenbaum (Zaoui), who has been deeply troubled since seeing her father killed by the Nazis in Europe.

== Background ==
Myron Levoy's original 1977 novel was an American Book Award Finalist for Children's Literature and an honor book for the Jane Addams Children's Book Award, the Boston Globe-Horn Book Award and The Horn Book. Alan & Naomi received the National Book Awards For Children's Literature in Germany and Austria, and the Dutch Silver Pencil Prize. In 1986 Alan & Naomi was adapted for a theatrical play, Geheime Freunde, by Rudolf Herfurtner. The novel has been translated into eleven languages.

== Production ==
Alan & Naomi was the first project from Leucadia Film Corporation, a Salt Lake City, Utah company founded in 1989 "by producers Sterling Van Wagenen and David Anderson and entrepreneur Ian Cumming". It was also Van Wagenen's theatrical directorial debut; in the mid-1980s, he had also helmed a Holocaust television documentary called Inside the Vicious Heart.

== Release ==
During its original 1992 run, Alan & Naomi was released in 100 theatres in 19 U.S. cities. On February 8, 1999, Canadian family-entertainment company CINAR acquired the film as part of its purchase of the twelve-title Leucadia library.

== Reception ==
The film won the Crystal Heart Award at the 1992 Heartland Film Festival. Vanessa Zaoui was also nominated for the 1993 Young Artist Award for Best Young Actress Co-starring in a Motion Picture.
