= Eric L. Tribunella =

Eric L. Tribunella is an American professor of English at the University of Southern Mississippi.

He graduated with bachelor's degrees in 1997 and 1998 and a master's degree in 2000 from the University of Florida and received a Ph.D. from the CUNY Graduate Center in 2005.

== Works ==
- Melancholia and Maturation: The Use of Trauma in American Children's Literature (2010)
- Reading Children's Literature: A Critical Introduction (with Carrie L. Hintz)
- A de Grummond Primer : Highlights of the Children's Literature Collection (2021) co-edited with Carolyn J. Brown and Ellen Hunter Ruffin ISBN 978-1-4968-3339-6
- Reading Young Adult Literature: A Critical Introduction by Carrie Hintz and Eric L. Tribunella (2024) ISBN 9781554815852
- Male Homosexuality in Children's Literature, 1867–1918: Young Uranians
