= The Solitaire Mystery =

1990 children's novel by Jostein Gaarder

- First edition (Norwegian)
- Author: Jostein Gaarder
- Original title: Kabalmysteriet
- Language: Norwegian
- Genre: Fantasy, philosophical novel
- Publisher: Aschehoug
- Publication date: 1990
- Publication place: Norway
- English publication date: 1996
- Media type: Print (hardback and paperback)
- Pages: 351
- ISBN: 0-425-16047-5
- OCLC: 34333870
- LC Class: MLCM 96/06284 (P)

The Solitaire Mystery (Norwegian: Kabalmysteriet) is a 1990 fantasy novel by Jostein Gaarder, the Norwegian author of the best-selling Sophie's World. The Solitaire Mystery, as with Sophie's World, has a philosophical content but, unlike Sophie's World, it does not explicitly mention philosophers and theories.

== Plot ==
The book follows two seemingly separate stories:

=== Hans-Thomas ===
A 12-year-old boy, Hans-Thomas, and his father are driving through Europe on a journey to locate and bring home the boy's estranged mother. Whilst on their journey, a strange little man at a petrol station gives Hans-Thomas a magnifying glass, saying mystically: "You'll need it!" and persuades them to drive the long route that takes them through a small village by the name of Dorf. Not long afterwards, Hans-Thomas and his father stop at a roadside café in this village, then Hans-Thomas wanders around the village and gets a giant sticky bun from the village's kind baker to eat on his journey. To Hans-Thomas's great surprise, hidden inside the sticky bun is a tiny book with writing so small that it cannot be read with the naked eye. Hans-Thomas begins to read the tiny book using his new magnifying glass and the story then alternates between Hans-Thomas's journey and the story in the sticky bun book.

=== Sticky bun book ===
The sticky bun book tells the story of an old baker whose grandfather gave him a drink of a wonderful liquid he called Rainbow Fizz (Rainbow Soda in the American edition). It came from an island which the grandfather had been shipwrecked on as a young man. On the island lived an old sailor called Frode as well as 53 other people who did not have names and they referred to themselves as the numbers on playing cards (52 cards plus a Joker). The Ace of Hearts was particularly enchanting and Frode had quite a crush on her even though she was forever "losing herself".

=== Crossing over of worlds ===
The two stories of Hans Thomas's journey and the events in the sticky bun book start to overlap:

However, the cards' predictions as told in the tiny book begin to reveal details about Hans Thomas's own plight to find his mother. It occurs to Hans Thomas that his mother bears a striking resemblance in her personality to the Ace of Hearts in that she 'loses herself' (disappears) for long periods. Also, throughout Hans Thomas's journey, he has seen the same odd little bearded man following him about (the man who gave him the magnifying glass which proved so useful to read the sticky bun book). But whenever Hans Thomas approaches the little man, he seems to dash away and vanish. The baffling thing for Hans Thomas is that he stopped for the cake merely by chance, and chose to eat a sticky bun by chance - how is it possible that a tiny book from a random bun is telling him things about his own life?

== Reception ==
Kabalmysteriet won Gaarder the Norwegian Critics Prize for Literature in 1990.

Kirkus' review had mixed feelings about The Solitaire Mystery. While "there are passages here .. that are ingenious and startling", reminding the reviewer of the philosophical fantasies of the Victorian writer George MacDonald, too much of the book is "repetitious, the imagery hazy, the conclusions unsurprising". The review concludes that the book is "Fascinating and frustrating in equal measure."

== Bibliography ==
- Kabalmysteriet (The Solitaire Mystery) (1990) ISBN 0-425-15999-X
