= Sophie's World =

1991 novel by Jostein Gaarder

- First edition (Norwegian)
- Author: Jostein Gaarder
- Original title: Sofies verden
- Language: Norwegian
- Genre: Philosophical novel
- Publisher: Aschehoug
- Publication date: 5 December 1991
- Publication place: Norway
- English publication date: 1994
- Media type: Print (hardcover & paperback) and audiobook (English, unabridged CD & download)
- Pages: 518 pp
- ISBN: 978-1-85799-291-5: 978-1-4272-0087-7; 978-1-4272-0086-0
- OCLC: 246845141
- LC Class: PT8951.17.A17

Sophie's World: A Novel About the History of Philosophy (Norwegian: Sofies Verden – Roman om Filosfiens Historie) is a 1991 novel by Norwegian writer Jostein Gaarder. It follows Sophie Amundsen, a Norwegian teenager, who is introduced to the history of philosophy as she is asked "Who are you?" "Where does this world come from?" in a letter from an unknown philosopher. The nonfictional content of the book roughly aligns with Bertrand Russell's A History of Western Philosophy.

Sophie's World became a best-seller in Norway and won the Deutscher Jugendliteraturpreis in 1994. The English translation was published in 1995, and the book was reported to be the best-selling book in the world that year. By 2011, the novel had been translated into fifty-nine languages, with over forty million print copies sold. It is one of the most commercially successful Norwegian novels outside Norway, and has been adapted into a film and a PC game.

== Plot summary ==
Sophie Amundsen is a 14-year-old girl who lives in Lillesand, Norway.

The book begins with Sophie receiving two messages in her mailbox and a postcard addressed to Hilde Møller Knag. Afterwards, she receives a packet of papers, part of a course in philosophy.

Sophie, without the knowledge of her mother, becomes the student of an old philosopher, Alberto Knox. Alberto teaches her about the history of philosophy. She gets a substantive and understandable review from the pre-Socratics to Jean-Paul Sartre. In addition to this, Sophie and Alberto receive postcards addressed to a girl named Hilde from a man named Albert Knag. As time passes, Knag begins to hide birthday messages to Hilde in ever more impossible ways, including hiding one inside an unpeeled banana and making Alberto's dog Hermes speak.

Eventually, through the philosophy of George Berkeley, Sophie and Alberto discover that they are actually fictional characters in a book written by Albert Knag as a 15th birthday gift for Hilde, his daughter. They also hypothesize that the "real world" in which their story is being written may itself be fictional. Hilde reads the manuscript, but begins to turn against her father after he continues to meddle with Sophie's life by sending fictional characters like Little Red Riding Hood and Ebenezer Scrooge to talk to her.

Alberto helps Sophie fight back against Knag's control by teaching her everything he knows about philosophy, through the Renaissance, Romanticism, and Existentialism, as well as Darwinism and the ideas of Karl Marx. These take the form of long pages of text, and, later, monologues from Alberto. Alberto manages to concoct a plan so that he and Sophie can finally escape Albert's imagination. The trick is performed on Midsummer's Eve, during a "philosophical garden party" that Sophie and her mother arranged to celebrate Sophie's fifteenth birthday. The party soon descends into chaos as Albert Knag loses control over the world, causing the guests to react with indifference to extraordinary occurrences. Alberto informs everyone that their world is fictional but the guests react with rage, believing him to be instilling dangerous values in the children. When a Mercedes smashes into the garden, Alberto and Sophie use it as an opportunity to escape. Knag is so focused on writing about the car that he does not notice them escaping into his world.

Having finished the book, Hilde decides to help Sophie and Alberto get revenge on her father. Alberto and Sophie can interact only weakly with items in Albert Knag's world and cannot be seen by anyone but other fictional characters. A woman from Grimms' Fairy Tales gives them food before they prepare to witness Knag's return to Lillesand, Hilde's home.

While at the airport, Knag receives notes from Hilde set up at shops and gateways, instructing him on items to buy. He becomes increasingly paranoid as he wonders how Hilde is pulling the trick off. When he arrives back home, Hilde has forgiven him now that he has learned what it is like to have his world interfered with. Alberto and Sophie listen as Knag tells Hilde about one last aspect of philosophy—the universe itself. He tells her about the Big Bang and how everything is made up of the same material, which exploded outward at the beginning of time. Hilde learns that when she looks at the stars she is actually seeing into the past. Sophie makes a last effort to communicate with her by hitting her and Knag with a wrench. Knag feels nothing, but Hilde feels as though a gadfly stung her, and can hear Sophie's whispers. Sophie wishes to ride in the rowboat but Alberto reminds her that, as they are not real people, they cannot manipulate objects. In spite of this, Sophie manages to untie the rowboat and they ride out onto the lake, immortal and invisible to all but a few. Hilde, inspired and mesmerized by philosophy and reconnected with her father, goes out to get the boat back.

=== Contents ===
1. The Garden of Eden
2. The Top Hat
3. The Myths
4. The Natural Philosophers
5. Democritus
6. Fate
7. Socrates
8. Athens
9. Plato
10. The Major's Cabin
11. Aristotle
12. Hellenism
13. The Postcards
14. Two Cultures
15. The Middle Ages
16. The Renaissance
17. The Baroque
18. Descartes
19. Spinoza
20. Locke
21. Hume
22. Berkeley
23. Bjerkely
24. The Enlightenment
25. Kant
26. Romanticism
27. Hegel
28. Kierkegaard
29. Marx
30. Darwin
31. Freud
32. Our Own Time
33. The Garden Party
34. Counterpoint
35. The Big Bang

== Translations ==
The book has been translated into several languages, including Portuguese, Persian, Bengali, English, Hindustani (Hindi, Marathi, Sindhi and Urdu), French, German, Greek, Chinese, and Kurdish. Below are mentioned the names and translators of the translations.

1. Arabic: عالم صوفي
2. Sindhi: Mumtaz Bukhari, سوفيءَ جي دنيا
3. Portuguese: João Azenha Jr., O Mundo de Sofia
4. English: Paulette Miller, Sophie's World
5. Persian: Hassan Kamshad, دنیای سوفی, 1997, Niloofar Publications
6. Russian: Tatyana Dobronitskaya, Юстейн Гордер, Мир Софии, 2000
7. Hindustani: Satyapaal Gautam, सोफी का संसार (Hindi)
8. Urdu: Shahid Hameed, سوفی کی دنیا
9. Turkish: Sofie'nin dünyası
10. Bengali: G.H. Habib, সফির জগৎ
11. Chinese: Xiao Baosen, 苏菲的世界
12. French: Hélène Hervieu and Martine Laffon, Le monde de Sophie, 1995, Éditions du Seuil
13. German: Gabriele Haefs, Sofies Welt, 1993, Carl Hanser Verlag
14. Azerbaijani: Narmin Kamal, "Sofinin dünyası"
15. Thai: "โลกของโซฟี"
16. Spanish: Kirsti Baggethun and Asunción Lorenzo, El Mundo De Sofía
17. Malayalam: K. B. Prasannakumar, സോഫിയുടെ ലോകം
18. Indonesian: Rahmani Astuti, Dunia Sophie, 2008, Mizan
19. Greek: Αγγελίδου Μαρία, Ο Κόσμος της Σοφίας
20. Central Kurdish: جیهانی سۆفیا
21. Pashto: د سوفي نړۍ
22. Polish: Iwona Zimnicka, Świat Zofii
23. Marathi: Smita limaye, सोफीज वर्ल्ड
24. Dutch: Janke Klok, Lucy Pijttersen, Kim Snoeijing and Paula Stevens, De wereld van Sofie, 1994, Houtekiet
25. Burmese: Maung Tha Noe, ဆိုဖီရဲ့ကမ္ဘာ
26. Hebrew: Dan Daur, עולמה של סופי

== Adaptations ==
=== Film ===
In 1999, Sophie's World was adapted into a Norwegian film by screenwriter Petter Skavlan. It was not widely released outside of Norway. Kjersti Holmen won an Amanda Award for her role in the movie.

=== Television ===
The 1999 film was also presented as an eight-part TV series in Australia and Iceland, again scripted by Petter Skavlan.

It was also adapted for television in 1995 by Paul Greengrass and shown on the BBC as part of The Late Show. This version starred Jessica Marshall-Gardiner as Sophie, Jim Carter as Alberto Knox, and Twiggy as Sophie's mother.

=== Board game ===
In 1999, it was made into a board game by Robert Hyde and Ken Howard, and published by Sophisticated Games Ltd.

=== Computer game ===
In 1997, it was adapted into a PC and Mac CD-ROM game by The MultiMedia Corporation. The game allows players to learn about philosophy as in the book, while adapting the metafiction elements for a virtual world.

=== Music ===
English space rock band Spiritualized named their 1997 studio album Ladies and Gentlemen We Are Floating in Space after a line in the novel. Chinese math rock indie band Baby Formula's self-titled album has a track called "Sophie's World (苏菲的世界)".

=== Graphic novel ===
In October 2022, the first of a two-volume graphic novel adaptation was released, titled Sophie's World: A Graphic Novel About the History of Philosophy, Vol. I: From Socrates to Galileo. Both were adapted from the Gaarder's novel by writer Vincent Zabus and artist Nicoby. The second volume released November 2023, titled Sophie's World: A Graphic Novel About the History of Philosophy, Vol. II: From Descartes to Modern Day.

== Censorship ==
In the Xiao Baosen-translated Chinese version (Simplified Chinese) published by Writers Publishing House, parts of the content related to Karl Marx were deleted according to the requirements of the Ministry of Culture of the People's Republic of China, such as the last 32 paragraphs in the Marx chapter.

== See also ==
- Simulated reality
- World as Myth
