= Jostein Gaarder =

Norwegian author (born 1952)

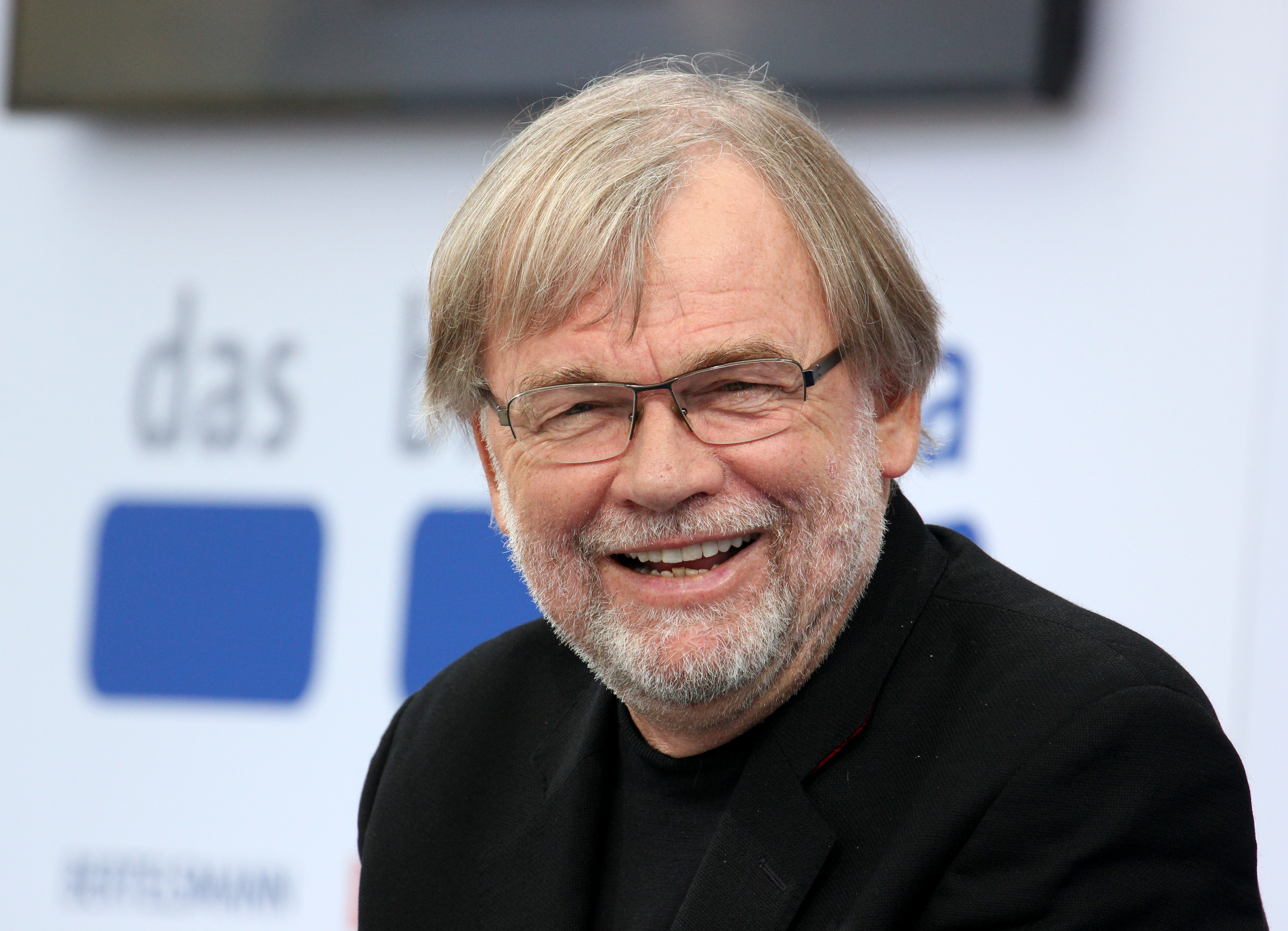
- Gaarder in 2017
- Born: 8 August 1952 (age 74); Oslo, Norway
- Education: Oslo Cathedral School; University of Oslo
- Occupations: Novelist, short story writer
- Spouse: Siri Dannevig
- Children: 2
- Writing career
- Genres: Children's literature, fiction
- Notable works: The Solitaire Mystery, Sophie's World, The Orange Girl
- Notable awards: Full list

Jostein Gaarder (Norwegian: [ˈjùːstæɪn ˈɡòːɖər]; born 8 August 1952) is a Norwegian intellectual and author of several novels, short stories, and children's books. Gaarder often writes from the perspective of children, exploring their sense of wonder about the world. He often utilizes metafiction in his works and constructs stories within stories. His best known work is the novel Sophie's World (1991). It has been translated into 60 languages; there are over 40 million copies in print.

== Early life ==
Gaarder was born and raised in Oslo. His father was a school headmaster and his mother, Inger Margrethe Gaarder, was a teacher and author of children's books.

Gaarder married Siri Dannevig in Oslo in 1974. They moved to Bergen, Norway in 1979 and had two sons.

Gaarder attended Oslo Cathedral School and the University of Oslo, where he studied Scandinavian languages and theology. After graduation in 1976, he was a high school teacher in Bergen, Norway, prior to his literary career.

In 1997, Gaarder and Siri Dannevig established the Sophie Prize. It was an environmental development prize of (USD 100,000 = 77,000 €), awarded annually until 2013, when it was announced that it would no longer be awarded due to lack of funds. It was named after the novel.

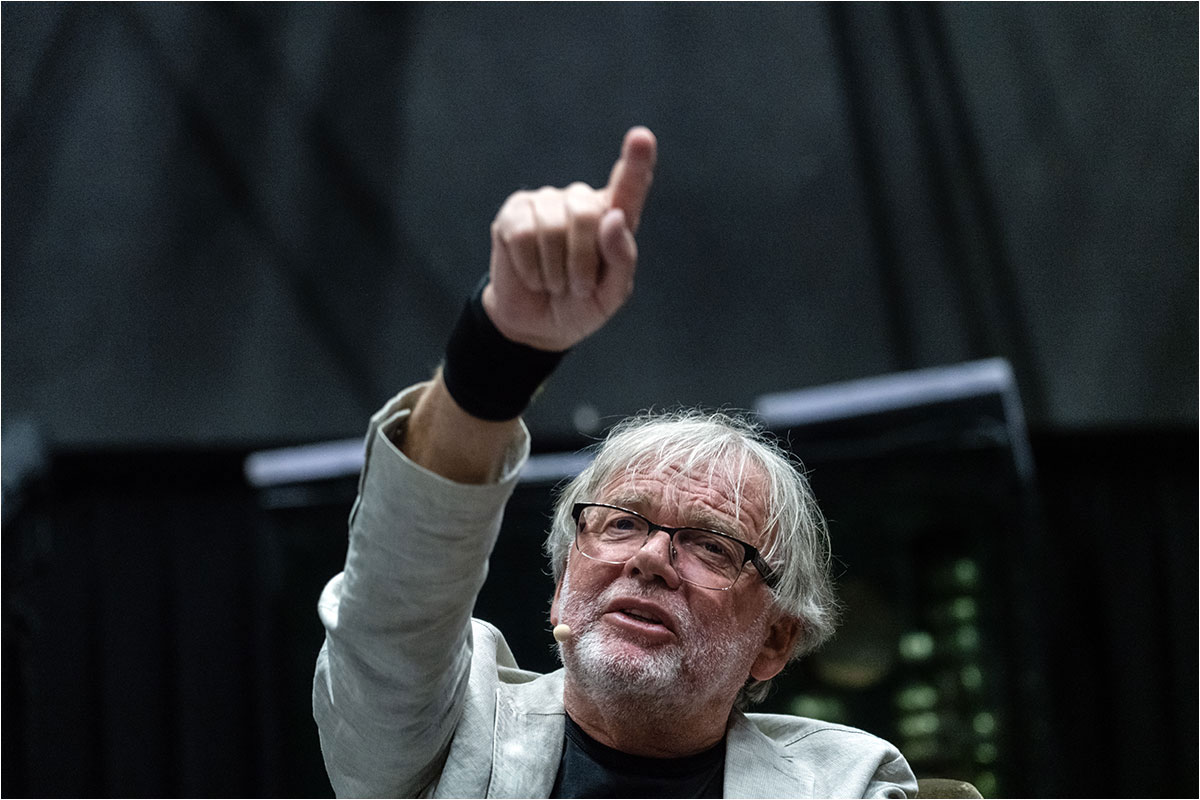
Gaarder at the LiteratureXchange Festival Aarhus, 2023

== Awards and prizes ==
- 1990 – Norwegian Critics Prize for Literature for the year's best children's or youth's literature, for Kabalmysteriet (The Solitaire Mystery)
- 1993 – Norwegian Booksellers' Prize for I et speil, i en gåte (Through a Glass, Darkly).
- 1994 – Deutscher Jugendliteraturpreis for Sophie's World.
- 1995 – Premio Bancarella for Il Mondo di Sofia, the Italian translation of Sophie's World.
- 1996 – Peer Gynt Prize
- 1997 – Buxtehude Bull for Durch einen Spiegel, in einem dunklen Wort, the German translation of I et speil, i en gåte.
- 2004 – the Willy-Brandt Award in Oslo.
- 2005 – Commander, The Royal Norwegian Order of St. Olav.
- 2005 – an Honorary degree at Trinity College, Dublin.

== Environmental activism ==
Gaarder has been involved in the promotion of sustainable development for nearly three decades. He established the Sophie Prize in 1997, an international award bestowed on foundations and individuals concerned with the environment. Through the Sophie Prize, Gaarder contributed over $1.5 million to worthy environmental causes. The final Sophie Prize was awarded in October 2013 to Bill McKibben.

== Political advocacy and religious controversy ==
Jostein Gaarder is active politically. The focus of his concern is the plight of Palestinian refugees, and he has vehemently criticized the Israeli occupation of the West Bank. In August 2006, Gaarder wrote a controversial op-ed titled "God's Chosen People" that was published in the largest daily newspaper in Norway, Aftenposten. Gaarder wrote it in response to the 2006 Israel–Lebanon conflict. He argued in favor of "recognizing the State of Israel of 1948, but not the one of 1967".

"God's Chosen People" had a broader scope than conflicting territorial claims. Gaarder described Judaism as "an archaic national and warlike religion", contrasting it with the Christian idea that the "Kingdom of God is compassion and forgiveness". Gaarder disputed allegations of antisemitism.

== List of works ==
- Diagnosen og andre noveller (The Diagnosis and Other Stories) (1986)
- Froskeslottet (The Frog Castle) (1988)
- Kabalmysteriet (The Solitaire Mystery) (1990) ISBN 0-425-15999-X
- Sofies verden (Sophie's World) (1991) ISBN 0-425-15225-1
- Julemysteriet (The Christmas Mystery) (1992) ISBN 0-374-12329-2 (1995 edition illustrated by Stella East ISBN 82-03-24090-9)
- Bibbi Bokkens magiske bibliotek (Bibbi Bokken's magic library) (together with Klaus Hagerup(1993) ISBN 82-00-21210-6
- I et speil, i en gåte (Through a Glass, Darkly) (1993) ISBN 0-7538-0673-8
- Hallo? Er det noen her? (Hello? Is Anybody There?) (1996) ISBN 0-374-32948-6
- Vita Brevis: A Letter to St Augustine (Also published in English as That Same Flower) (1998) ISBN 0-7538-0461-1
- Maya (1999) ISBN 0-7538-1146-4
- Sirkusdirektørens datter (The Ringmaster's Daughter) (2001) ISBN 0-7538-1700-4
- Appelsinpiken (The Orange Girl) (2004) ISBN 0-297-84904-2
- Sjakk Matt (Checkmate) (2006)
- De gule dvergene (The Yellow Dwarves) (2006)
- Slottet i Pyreneene (The Castle in the Pyrenees) (2008)
- Det spørs (2012) ISBN 9788203254789
- Anna. En fabel om klodens klima og miljø (The World According to Anna) (2013)
- Anton og Jonatan (Anton and Jonatan) (2014) ISBN 9788203256738
- Dukkeføreren (2016) ISBN 9788203360503
