= Demodocus =

Demodocus or Demodokus may refer to:

- Demodocus (Odyssey character), a poet in Homer's Odyssey
- Demodocus of Leros, an ancient Greek poet
- Demodocus (dialogue), ascribed to Plato
- Papilio demodocus, a species of swallowtail butterfly
- 11429 Demodokus, an asteroid sharing Jupiter's orbit
