= Leros =

Greek island in the Aegean Sea

Leros Λέρος
- Municipality
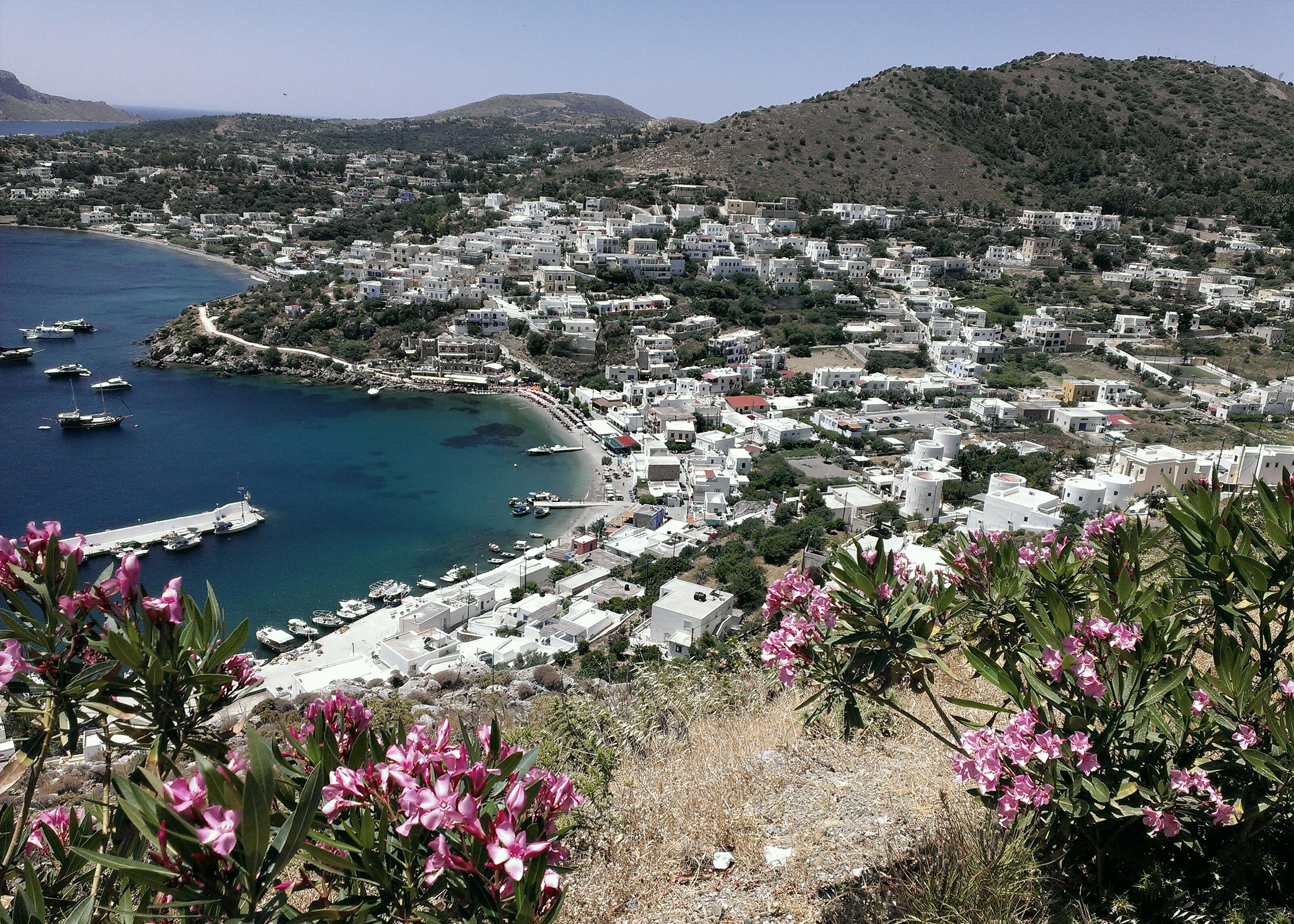
- View of Panteli village in Leros

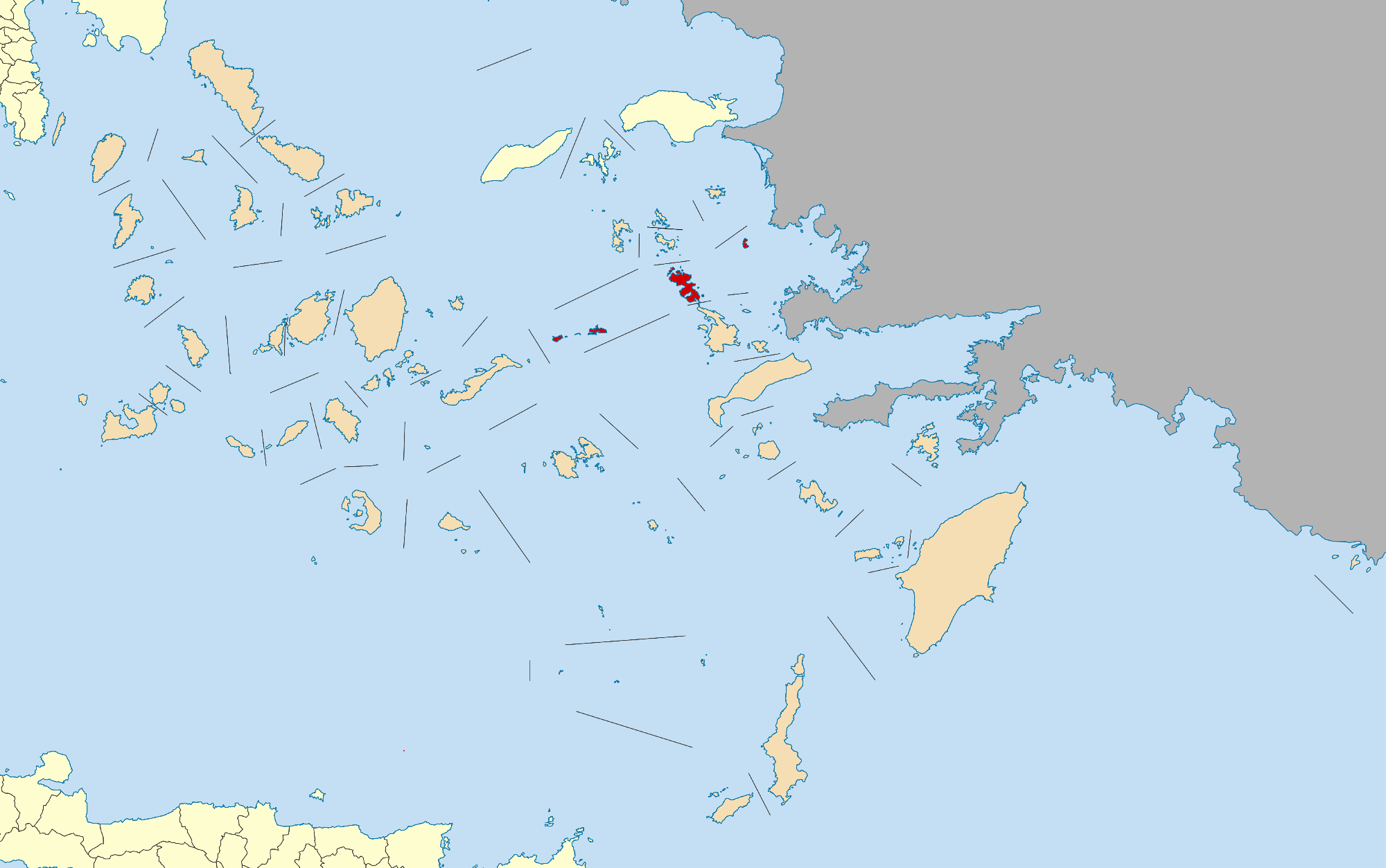

- Location within Greece
- Coordinates: 37°09′N 26°51′E
- Country: Greece
- Administrative region: South Aegean
- Regional unit: Kalymnos
- Seat: Agia Marina

Area
  - Municipality: 74.17 km^{2} (28.64 sq mi)
- Highest elevation: 320 m (1,050 ft)
- Lowest elevation: 0 m (0 ft)

Population (2021)
  - Municipality: 7,992
  - Density: 107.8/km^{2} (279.1/sq mi)
- Time zone: UTC+2 (EET)
  - Summer (DST): UTC+3 (EEST)
- Postal code: 854 00
- Area code: 22470
- Vehicle registration: ΚΧ, ΡΟ, ΡΚ
- Website: www.leros.gr

Leros (Greek: Λέρος), also called Lero (from the Italian language), is a Greek island and municipality in the Dodecanese in the southern Aegean Sea. It lies 317 kilometres (197 miles; 171 nautical miles) from Athens's port of Piraeus, from which it can be reached by a nine-hour ferry ride or by a 45-minute flight from Athens. It is about 32 kilometres (20 miles) from Turkey. Leros is part of the Kalymnos regional unit. It has a population of 7,992 (2021).

== Geography ==
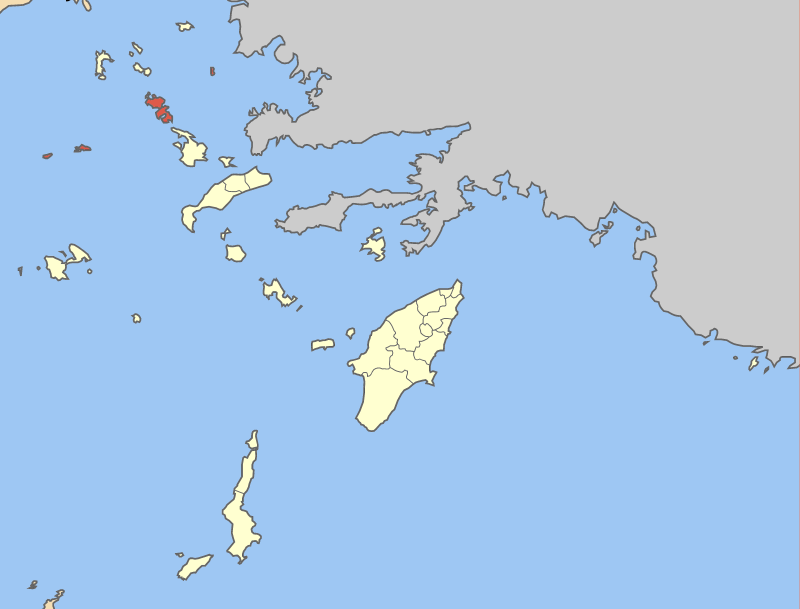
Leros in Dodecanese

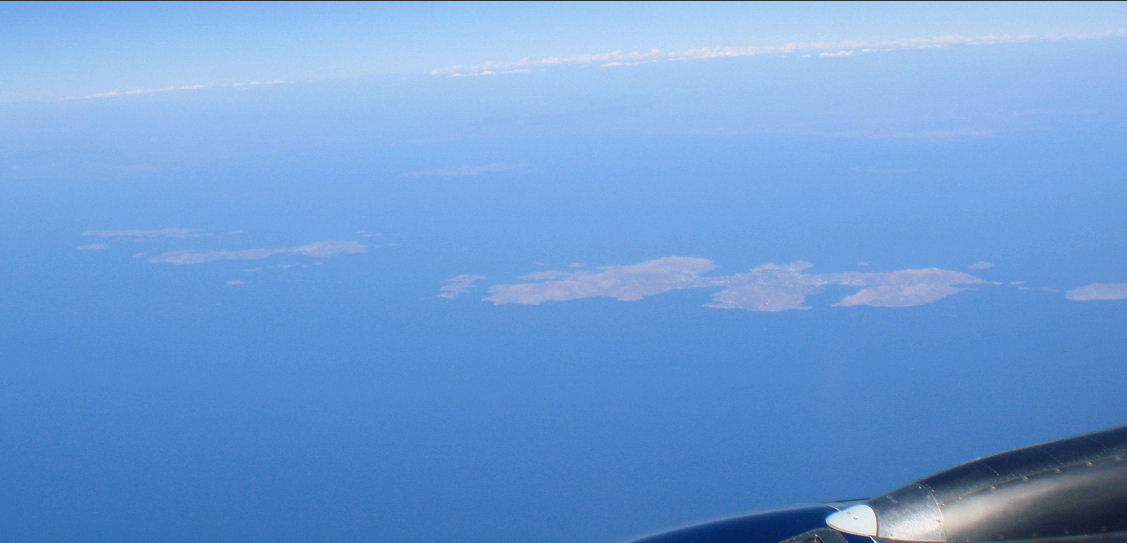
Front, left to right: Arkoi, Leipsoi, Leros. Back, left to right: Agathonisi, Farmakonisi and the Turkish coastline

The municipality has an area of 74.172 km^{2} (28.638 sq mi). The municipality includes the populated offshore island of Farmakonisi (pop. 21), as well as several uninhabited islets, including Levitha and Kinaros, and had a 2021 census population of 7,992, although this figure swells to over 15,000 during the summer peak. The island has a coastline of 71 kilometres (44 miles). It is known for its imposing medieval castle of the Knights of Saint John possibly built on a Byzantine fortress. Nearby islands are Patmos, Lipsi, Kalymnos, and the small islands of Agia Kyriaki and Farmakos. In ancient times it was considered the island of Parthenos Iokallis and linked to the Hellenistic and Roman literature on Meleager and the Meleagrides. The administrative centre and largest town is Agia Marina, with a population of 2,380 inhabitants in 2021. Other sizable towns are Lákki (pop. 2,093), Xirókampos (710), Kamára (673), and Álinda (699).

== Transportation ==
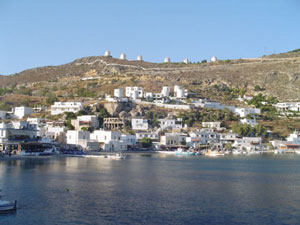
Panteli Beach, Leros

The Leros Municipal Airport at Partheni connects the island multiple times a day with Athens (45 minute flight). There are also ferry connections to and from Piraeus and the other islands of the Dodecanese, including the HighSpeed Ferry, which connects directly to Mykonos during summer (4 hours). The Catamaran Dodekanisos Express connects Leros with most of the Dodecanese islands. Leros also has a range of connections to other nearby islands with airports, including Kos, Kalymnos, Rhodes and Samos, which are a short boat ride to Leros (1 – 2 hours).

== Traditional music ==
Many local songs of Leros are among the most famous in the traditional (nisiotika) music of Greece, the most celebrated being "Pos to Trivun to Piperi", "Mes tou Aegeou ta Nisia" and "Proutzos". Lerikos is the name of the local dance; also noteworthy is the Issos dance. The most loved instruments in the island are tsampouna (τσαμπούνα), lyra (λύρα) and violin. There is a special genre of music on Leros called "Havas" (plural:Havades). The best known havas on Leros is that of Prouzos. There are also some well known havades such as "Tou Yiannouká", "Tou Mpiláli" aka "Ároma". There are some lesser known such as "Tou Nisíriou", "Tou Loulourgá", "Tou Yiagoúla" and "Tou Kantoúni". Famous musicians of Leros include:

- Aristídis Zórzou
- Nikólas Drákos
- Nikólas Zórzou
- Hatzidákis Family

== Food ==
Leros is famous for its local food and sweets. Traditionally, this was due to the range of seabound trade that connected Leros to most other islands of the Eastern Mediterranean, and parts of Asia Minor and North Africa, guaranteeing fresh produce and a range of recipes and styles that made Leros cuisine unique. In more modern times, the Italian occupation led to Leros adding an Italian style to its cuisine, whereby now many restaurants in Leros provide a unique mix of Lerian, Greek and Italian restaurants, dishes and cooking styles. Some of the more unique offerings of Leros include gavafes, a unique tropical fruit that grows only in Leros; mizithra, a local hard, salty cheese often cured in the sediment of red wine; Kolios Pastos, mackerel cured in sea salt; Lerian Thyme honey, a particularly flavourful honey derived from the thyme-filled hills of Leros; Pougkakia, a Lerian dessert offered at weddings (but commonly available in the many sweets shops in Leros); Patsavouropita (a cake with layers of filo and syrup); Soumada, a sweet drink made of almonds; and Lerian cheese pie.

== History ==
=== Antiquity ===
Thucydides stressed the special importance of the bays and the harbours of Leros during the Peloponnesian War (431 BC – 404 BC), where Leros supported the democratic Athenians. After the end of the war, Leros came under the sovereignty of the Spartans. The island had a famous sanctuary of the greek goddess Artemis.

It then followed the fate of the rest of the Dodecanese Islands during the years of Alexander the Great and his successors, the Roman years and the Byzantine period. After the division of the Roman Empire, Leros was part of the Byzantine Empire. On the island of Farmaco east from Leros, a few miles from Didyma on the Turkish coast, Julius Caesar was held as a hostage by local pirates for forty days.

=== Byzantine, Italian and Hospitaller periods ===
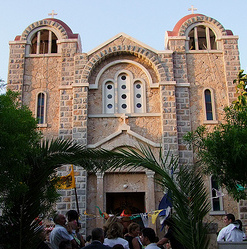
The church of Agia Marina

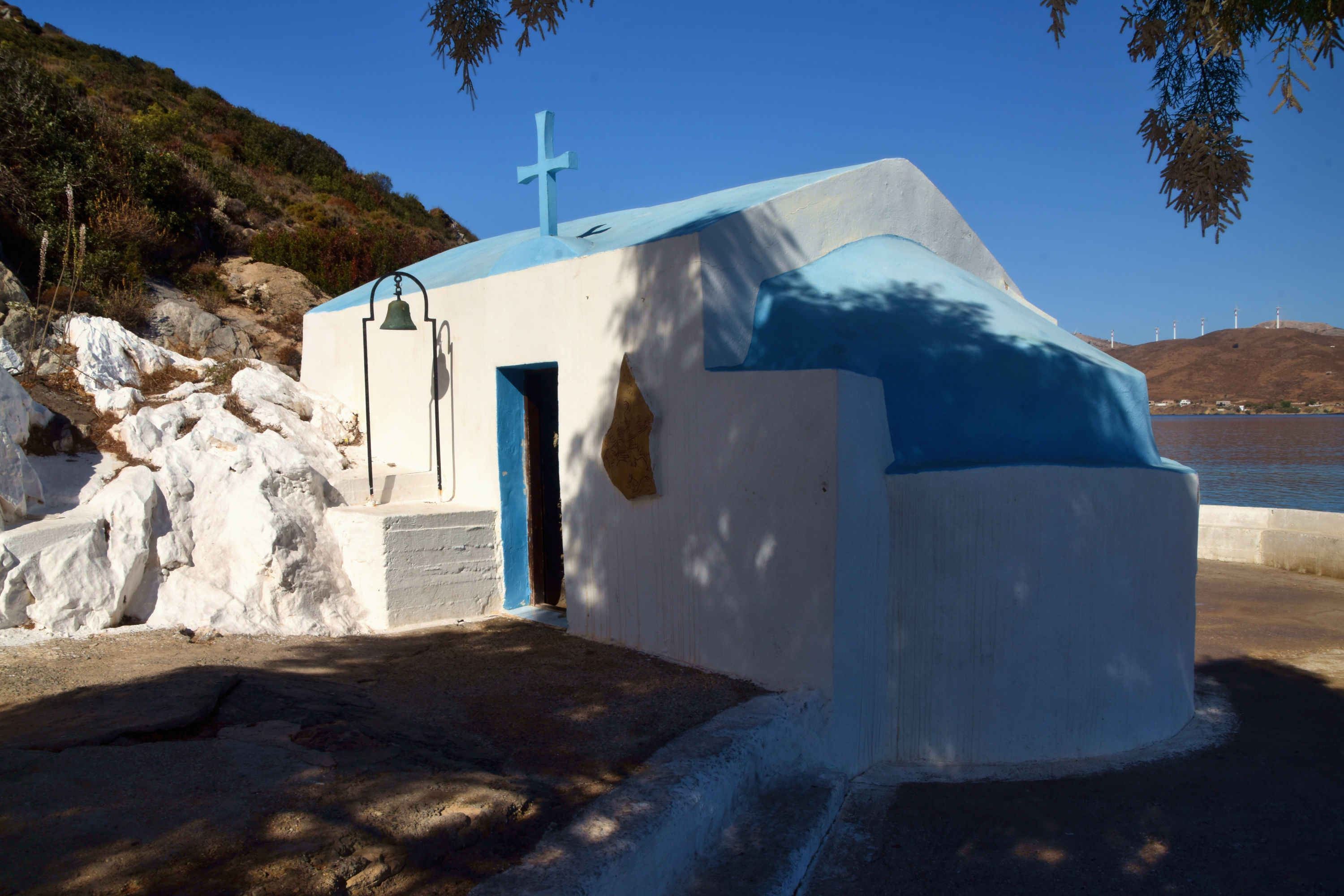
Agios Georgios Drymona

During the Byzantine era, the island was incorporated into the Theme of Samos.

During the thirteenth century, the island was occupied by the Genoese and then by the Venetians. In the year 1309, the Knights of St John seized and fortified Leros. In 1505, the Ottoman admiral Kemal Reis, with three galleys and seventeen other warships, besieged the castle but could not capture it. The operation was repeated in 1508 with more ships, but again nothing was achieved. Legend has it that then the island was rescued by the only surviving knight, barely 18 years old. He dressed women and children in the armor of the dead defenders, convincing the Ottomans that the garrison of Leros was still strong.

=== Ottoman period ===
Finally, on 24 December 1522, following the siege of Rhodes, a treaty was signed between Sultan Suleiman and the Grand Master of the Knights, Philippe Villiers de L'Isle-Adam, and Leros, along with all the Aegean possessions of the Order, passed into Ottoman hands, which ruled the island with brief interruptions during a period of four hundred years.

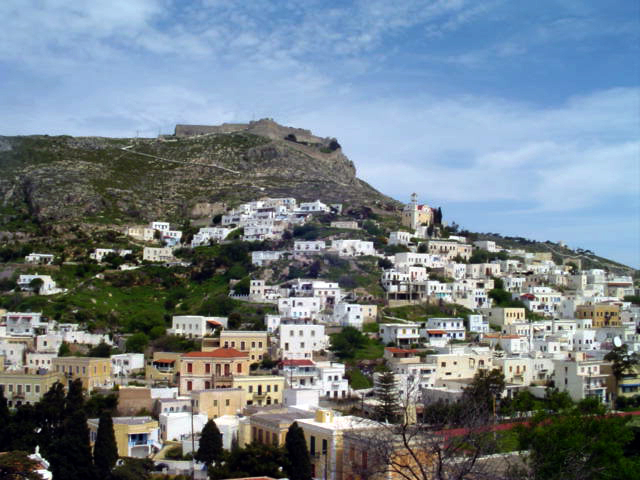
View of the castle of Leros

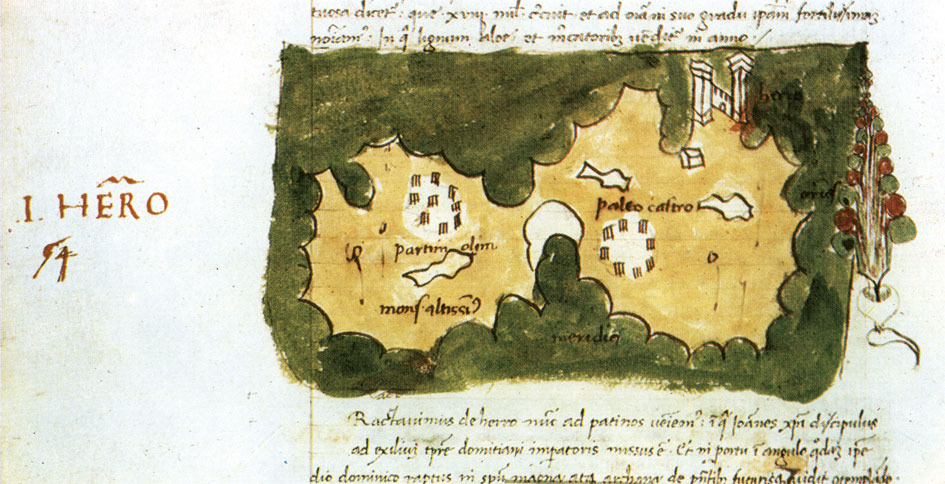
A 1420 map of the island where the name Hero is used

Under Ottoman rule, and along with the other islands, Leros enjoyed a privileged regime, with partial autonomy and self–government.

During the Greek Revolution of 1821, the island was liberated and became an important base for the re-supplying of the Greek Navy. Administratively, it came under the jurisdiction of the Temporary Committee of the Eastern Sporades. With the Treaty of London, on 3 February 1830, however, which determined the borders of the newly established Greek state, the freed islands of the Eastern Sporades were again given over to the Ottoman Empire.

According to the Ottoman General Census of 1881/82–1893, the kaza of Leros had a total population of 6,754, consisting of 6,623 Greeks, 18 Muslims and 113 foreign citizens. In the "Diary of the Prefecture of the Archipelago" of 1886, Leros, along with the islands of Patmos, Lipsos and Fournoi, belonged to the Ottomans. The island's administrative council was made up of both Greeks and Turks.

=== Italian period ===
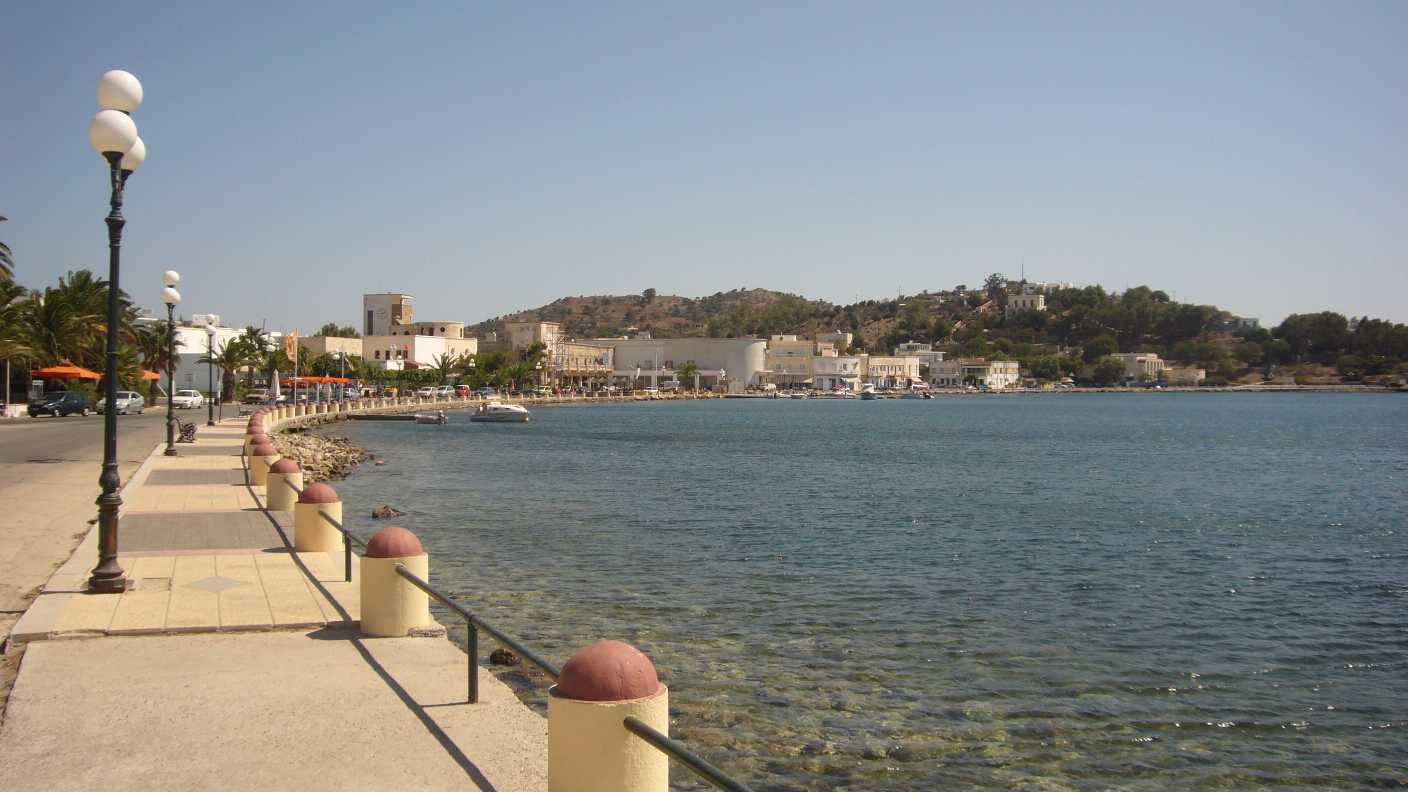
Promenade of Lakki

In 1912, during the Libyan War against the Ottoman Empire, Italy occupied all of the Dodecanese islands. On 12 May 1912, the island was seized by the sailors of the Italian Navy cruiser San Giorgio. The Greek inhabitants of the islands declared the autonomy of the islands under the title "The Aegean State", with the aim of unification with Greece, but with the outbreak of the First World War, these moves came to nothing, and Italy retained control of the islands.

From 1916 to 1918, the British used Leros as a naval base. In the Venizelos–Tittoni agreement of 1919, the island was to be returned to Greece, along with all of the Dodecanese except Rhodes, but after the Greek defeat in the Greco-Turkish War, Italy canceled the agreement. As a result, the Treaty of Lausanne confirmed the Italian possession of Leros and the Dodecanese.

The new Italian Fascist regime actively attempted to Italianize the Dodecanese, by making the Italian language compulsory, giving incentives to locals to adopt Italian nationality, and clamping down on Greek institutions.

During the 31 years that the Italians remained in Leros, they planned to build and fortify the island, since its strategic position and its large natural harbours (the largest of which, Lakki, is the largest deepwater harbour in the Mediterranean Sea), made it an ideal naval base. The fortification of Leros and the creation of a major naval base ensured that the Italians had control over an area of vital interest to the Allies (the Aegean, the Dardanelles and the Near East). Mussolini, who called Leros "the Corregidor of the Mediterranean", saw the island as a crucial base for the Italian domination of the eastern Aegean Sea.

==== Portolago/Lakki ====
In the 1930s a new model town and major naval base, Portolago, was built by the Italian authorities. It is one of the best examples of Italian Rationalist architecture. Mussolini was said to have a mansion for himself in the town.

After Leros was transferred to Greece, it was renamed Lakki.

=== World War II ===
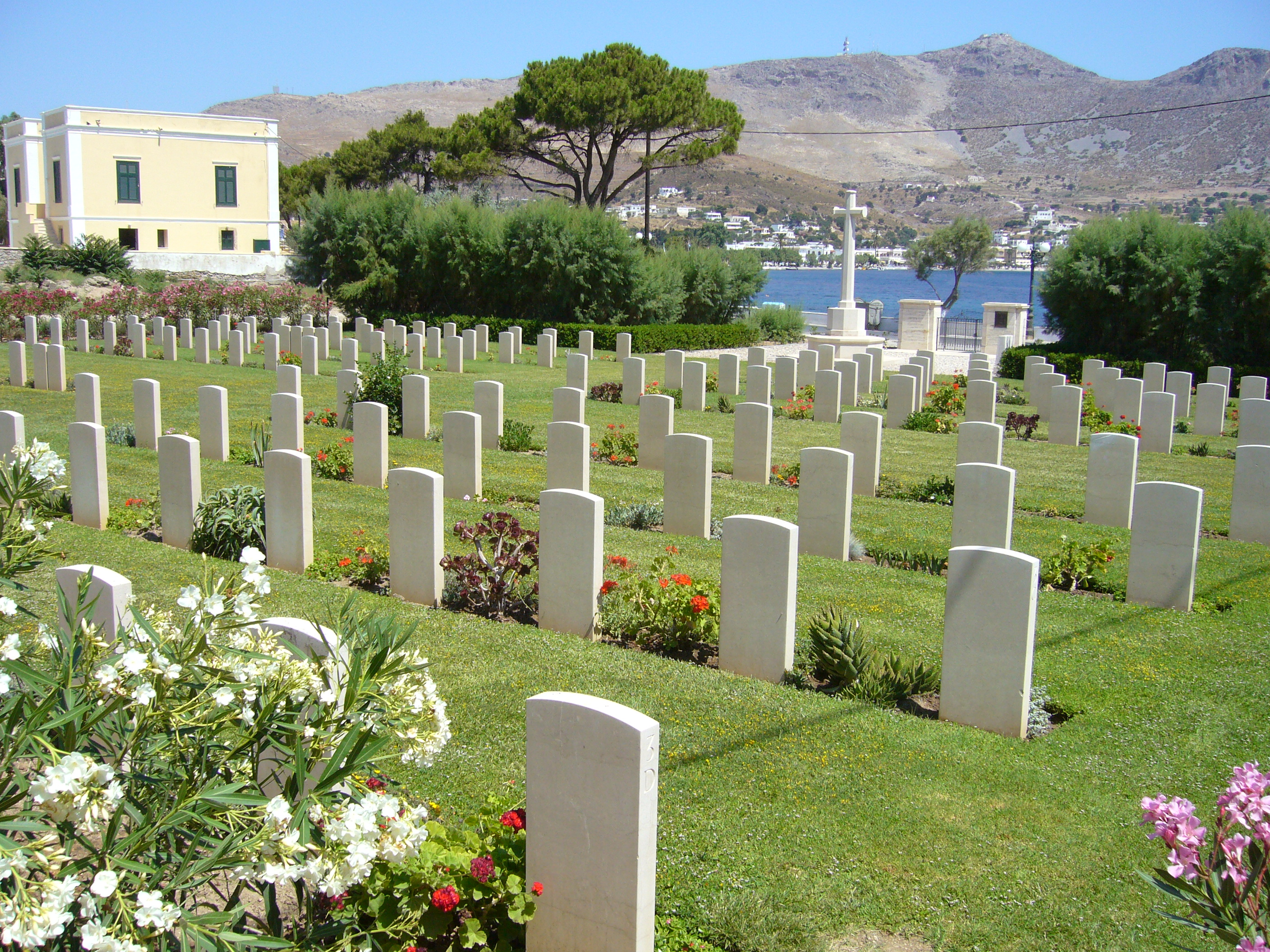
Commonwealth War Graves Commission cemetery

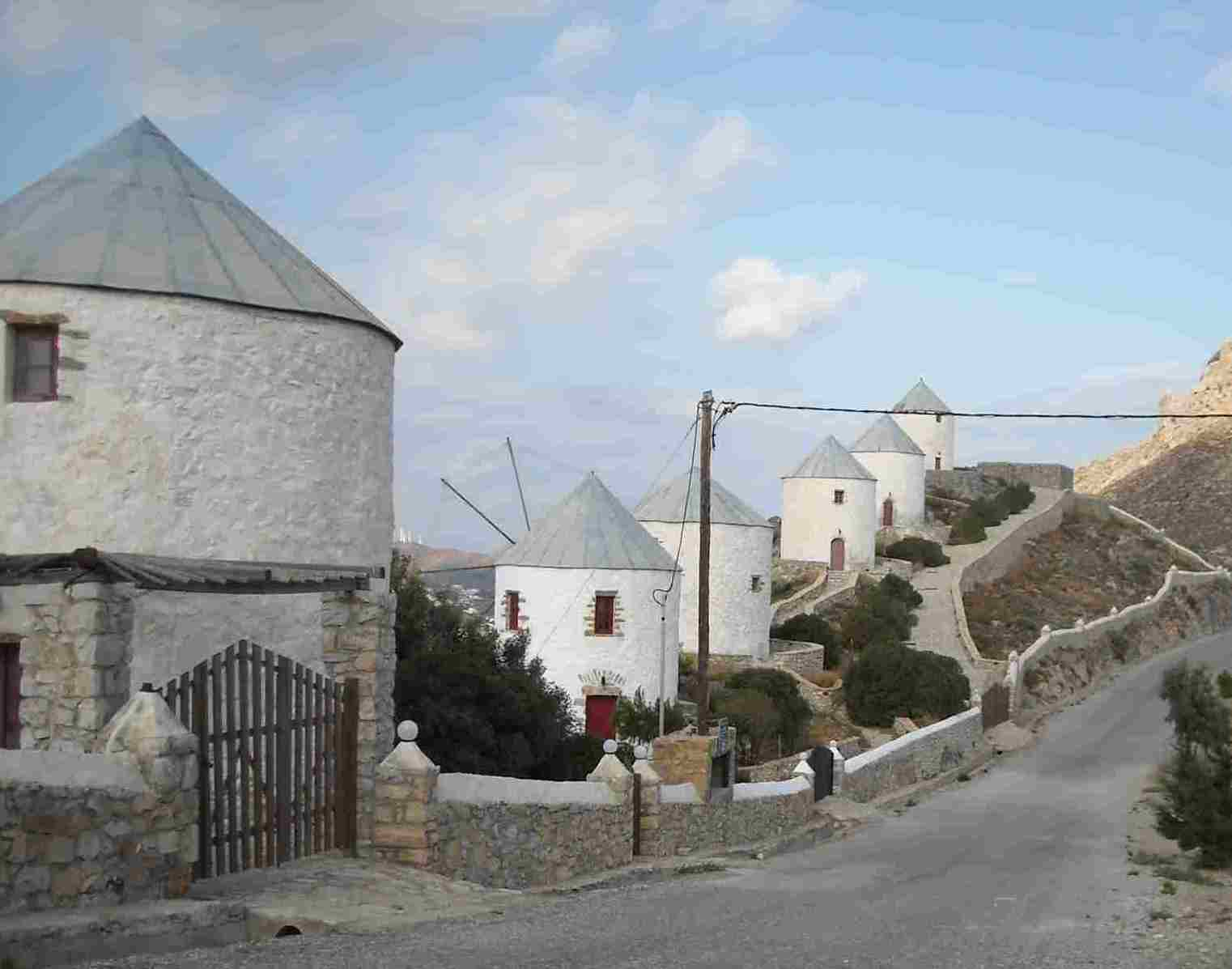
Windmills of the island

From 1940, when Italy entered the Second World War on the side of Germany, Leros suffered bombing raids by the British, including Port Laki, on 26 November 1940, by the Royal Navy (Fleet Air Arm) - Swordfish aircraft of 815 and 819 Squadrons, operating from HMS Illustrious. As a result of the excellent anchorage provided to warships by the many natural coves, the island was the second most bombed during World War Two (after Crete). On 8 September 1943, as Italy could not continue the war on the German side, it signed an armistice and came over to the Allied camp. After the Italian armistice, British reinforcements arrived on Leros and other Dodecanese islands and the island suffered continuous German aerial bombardment. One of the largest attacks was on the Greek Navy's flagship, the Vasilissa Olga, sunk by German bombers on Sunday, 26 September 1943, along with HMS Intrepid, while they were anchored in Portolago. The island of Leros was finally captured by German troops during Operation Taifun in airborne and amphibious assaults between 12–16 November 1943. The forces involved were paratroop units and a battalion from the elite Brandenburg division. The ground troops were supported by bombers of the Luftwaffe. Among them I. and II. group of Stuka-Wing 3. I. Group operated from Megara Air Base. The island remained under German occupation until the end of the war.

The 1957 novel and subsequent 1961 film The Guns of Navarone by Alistair MacLean was contextually based on the Battle of Leros.

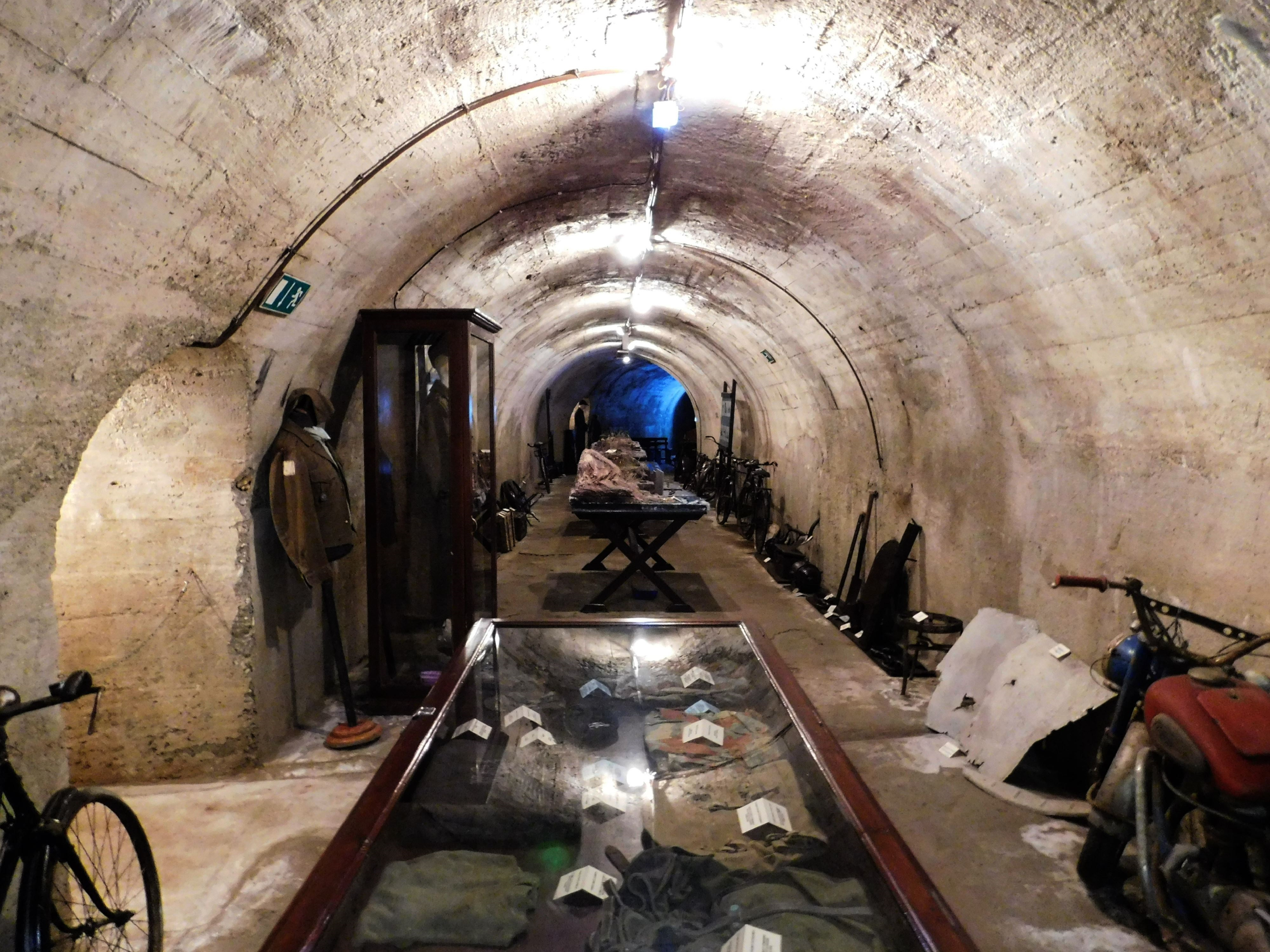
Leros War Museum

The War Museum of Leros is located in a rebuilt war tunnel dug by the Italians. It was part of a vast network of tunnels and overland defensive positions built in the Merikia area for the storage of ammunition. The tunnel fort houses a huge collection of World War II military artifacts, including weaponry, maps, photographs, army uniforms, and other military memorabilia.

=== Post-war history ===
After the Germans evacuated the island, Leros came under British administration until 7 March 1948 when Leros, together with the other Dodecanese Islands, was united with Greece. During the post-war years, the Greek government utilized numerous buildings in Leros for various reasons. In 1959, the mental hospital of Leros was founded in Lepida. During the junta of the Colonels, the island was used as a place of internal exile for political dissenters, with old Italian barracks of the island used as an internment camp.

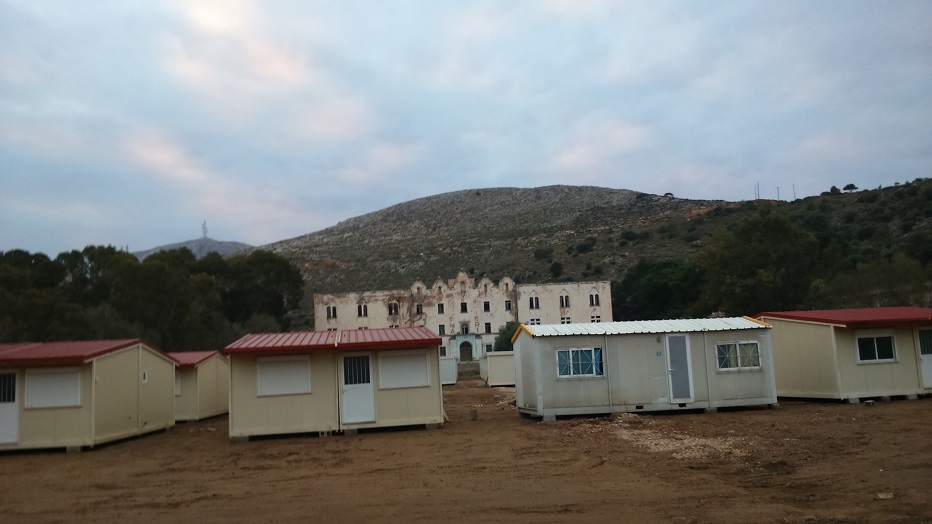
Leros hotspot (refugee reception camp) on the grounds of the Leros mental hospital

During the dictatorship period of Greece (1967-1974), 4,000 political prisoners were exiled in the same spaces of the mental hospital which were used as a concentration camp. In 1989, Leros came to Europe-wide attention as a result of a scandal involving embezzlement of funds and the maltreatment of about 3,000 mental patients at the mental hospital on the island. Funding from the government led to a rapid and substantial improvement in conditions. A June 2009 BBC report suggests these improvements have not all been sustained.

In December 2015, during the European migration crisis, the Greek Government along with the Alternate Migration Policy Minister (Ioannis Mouzalas) and the Mayor of Leros (Michalis Kolias), decided to build a refugees' reception centre. The camp is termed a "hotspot" and is able to shelter up to 1,000 individuals. The presence of asylum-seekers on Leros is controversial. There are reports in Arabic media that Greek locals have attacked and harassed asylum-seekers and humanitarian aid workers alike.

The hotspot of Leros is located near the mental hospital which has been internationally known as "Europe's guilty secret", as coined in an Observer article. In the same space of Lepida (after almost 15 years of implementing deinstitutionalisation programmes financed by EU), about 200 patients are still accommodated in small rehabilitation structures.

== Notable people ==
- Demodocus of Leros, a sixth-century BC gnomic poet
- Pherecydes of Leros
- Totis Filakouris, footballer for Panathinaikos during the years 1965–1975
- Theodosis Macheras, football player
- Ourania Rebouli, a marathon runner at the 2016 Olympics
- Emmanuel Staravero (1819–1872), Greek bishop of the Ecumenical Patriarchate of Constantinople

== See also ==
- List of Crusader castles
