= Demodocus of Leros =

6th-century BC Greek poet

Demodocus (/dɪˈmɒdəkəs/; Ancient Greek: Δημόδoκος, Demodokos) of Leros was an ancient Greek poet who is believed to have lived during the sixth century BC on the small island of Leros in the Aegean Sea. He composed in elegiacs and iambs and appears to have specialized in gnomic poetry like his likely contemporary Phocylides. Little of his poetry survives, preserved in brief quotations by other authors, but it is possible that, like those of Phocylides, many of his gnomic utterances opened with the tag "And Demodocus says ...," as in the following assessment of Milesians:

And Demodocus says this: Milesians aren't stupid,
they just act as if they are.

καὶ τόδε Δημοδόκου. Μιλήσιοι ἀξύνετοι μὲν
οὔκ εἰσιν, δρῶσιν δ' οἷά περ ἀξύνετοι.

M.L. West, who characterizes this couplet and similar fragments dealing with Demodocus' contemporary Lerians as "brilliant", notes that the poet's use of the elegiac couplet in poetry with an "epigrammatic air" is indicative of the meter's suitability for composing the pithy verse that would later become a hallmark of the classical epigram.

== Works cited ==
- Campbell, D.A. (1982), Greek Lyric Poetry (2nd ed.), London, ISBN 0-86292-008-6.
- West, M.L. (1974), Studies in Greek Elegy and Iambus, Berlin, ISBN 978-3110045857.
