= Emmanuel Staravero =

Roman-catholic archbishop

- Archbishop of Dramas
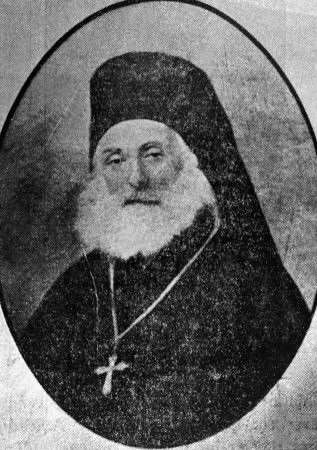
- Church: Bulgarian Greek Catholic Church
- Installed: 21 November 1861
- Term ended: 11 September 1872

Personal details
- Born: 15 September 1819 Leros, Ottoman Empire
- Died: 11 September 1872 (aged 52) Constantinople, Ottoman Empire

Emmanuel (Meletius) Staravero (1819-1872) was a Greek bishop of the Ecumenical Patriarchate of Constantinople since 1840 and since 1861 bishop of the Bulgarian Greek Catholic Church.

== Biography ==
=== Orthodox Bishop ===
Emmanuel Staraveros was born on September 15, 1819 in a Greek Orthodox family on the island of Leros.

On November 21, 1840 became the Pogonian archbishop of the Ecumenical Patriarchate. On July 16, 1848 Staraveros was elected eparch of Lovech after the expulsion of his predecessor Meletius I Lovchansky.

Metropolitan German Sardian writes:

"And when this Meletius, due to the movements of his Christians raised against him and due to some of his canonical mistakes, was dropped from his diocese, the Pelenian Archbishop Meletios was elected (on July 16, 1848), according to the forerunner, obliging to keep the laws of chanting and obedience to the canonical cyriarch of this world episcopate - the Metropolitan of Tarnovo Atanasii Turnovski".

Meletius was greeted in Lovech only by the clergy. They allow him to visit the high-end church, being given the condition for a short time to learn Bulgarian, or he will not be paid a slave. This stiff position makes Meletius care for his flock.

Meletius moves the market day in Lovech from Sunday to Saturday to allow Christians to visit unchallenged church service. So Meletius II leaves very good impressions in his flock and the Bulgarian municipality is calming.

Meletius did not last long in the Ottoman throne due to a conflict with the Ottoman authorities on the occasion of the preservation of the Bulgarian Donna from the Botevgrad valley and in the beginning of 1852 he was forced to leave the Lovchian Eparchy and in his place was appointed the Bulgarian Ilarion Lovchansky.

Meletius was moved to Drama. On 21 December 1859, together with Matthew Samokovsky, they were summoned to Constantinople as accused. On January 18, 1860, they were acquitted.

On April 30, 1859, the Serbian Diary published in Novi Sad wrote:

"From Bulgaria, we get these novelties for the Bulgarian affairs... Meletius, Archbishop of Drama, agrees well with the Turkish beys so that it can more easily oppress the Christian Bulgarians. It is precisely because of the Greek propaganda and the abuses of the Greek bishops that the Western Bulgarians are awake. The Greeks wanted to overthrow Bulgarians in Macedonia through schools; this was somewhat attributed to them, because many Bulgarians won on their part. But now the Bulgarians have a fence in the face of their schools and are already starting to burn the Greek books, as the Greeks were burning the Bulgarians earlier. By pressing the people, the Phanarot princes made him open his eyes."

In the early 1860s, the Nevrokop Bulgarians managed to achieve the dismissal of the protosynkellos of the metropolitan - priest Georgi Strandzhalia of Silivria - a fierce fighter against the Bulgarians.

=== Eastern Catholic Bishop ===
In 1861, Meletius accepted the union with several families, which caused a huge response in the Orthodox Church. On November 21, 1861, he formally converted himself and was ordained as Archbishop of Dramas.

He headed the unified Catholic community of the Byzantine Rite in Constantinople, which has neither a school nor a church. Its liturgies were performed in the Latin temples. On November 29, 1861 Staravero served in the St. John the Baptist Church of St. Trinity in Galata. On June 30, 1862, he went to Rome.

In 1865, Staravero co-ordained priest Raphael Popov to the episcopate. Together with Benjamin Naples attended the First Vatican Council (1869-1870). He died on 11 September 1872 and was buried in the Unified Cathedral of the Holy Trinity in Constantinople.
