= Pseudo-Phocylides =

Ancient apocryphal text

Pseudo-Phocylides is an apocryphal work, at one time, claiming to have been written by Phocylides, a Greek philosopher of the 6th century BC. Its authorship was deciphered by Jacob Bernays. The text is noticeably Jewish, and depends on the Septuagint, although it does not make direct references to either the Hebrew Bible or Judaism. Textual and linguistic studies point to the work as having originally been written in Greek, and having originated somewhere between 100BC and 100AD, although the oldest surviving manuscripts date from the 10th century AD.

== Authorship ==
Jonathan Klawans believes the author was a Christian.

== Texts ==
Douglas Young used five manuscripts for his edition: M (tenth cent., in Paris); B (tenth cent., in Oxford); P (twelfth cent., in Paris); L (thirteenth cent., in Florence); V (thirteenth-fourteenth cent., in Vienna).

== Description ==
Pseudo-Phocylides consists of a series of aphorisms, and these refer indirectly to each of the Noachide Laws, as well as the so-called unwritten laws of the Greeks. There are about 250 in total, and these are written as a series of hexameter verses, in the form of a teaching manual; each maxim directly commanding the reader to obey it. The poem was a popular school textbook for many years especially during the Reformation, with several translations and prints from 1545 onwards.

== Example translations ==
There are several translations of Pseudo-Phocylides. Some of the maxims in Pseudo-Phocylides were copied directly into one of the Sibylline Oracles, found in Book 2. The text of Pseudo-Phocylides is published in volume 2 of Old Testament Pseudepigrapha edited by James Charlesworth. Some authors, including Luke T. Johnson, believe there is a resemblance in the work to Leviticus 19, and also to how the New Testament Letter of James is a moral code of conduct for Christians.

From Pieter van der Horst's translation:

Remain not unmarried, lest you die nameless.
Cut not a youth's masculine procreative faculty.
And let not women imitate the sexual role of men.
Long hair is not fit for men, but for voluptuous women.

Other sections of the text, which were once attributed to Phocylides of Miletos, detailed that the tongue is mightier than the sword.

Do not be carried away in your heart by the delights of bold talk.
Practice the art of speaking, which will profit everyone greatly.
Speech is for man a sharper weapon than the sword;
God has given each being one weapon: to birds,
The ability to fly; to coursers, speed; to lions, strength;
To bulls, horns which grow of themselves; to bees, he has given
Their sting as a natural defense; to men, the armor of words.

In 2005, Walter T. Wilson composed a new translation, published with attached the Greek text.

Do not revel in boastfulness and rage in your heart.
Practice speaking well, which will greatly benefit everyone.
Surely the word is for a man a weapon sharper than iron.
To each God has allotted a weapon: power to roam the air
to birds, to horses swiftness, strength to lions;
for bulls there are self-growing horns; stingers to bees

he's given as an inborn defense, but the word to people for protection.

Its authorship was deciphered by Jacob Bernays and its contents are widely discussed and studied in theology schools even to this day.
