= Phocylides =

Ancient Greek gnomic poet

Phocylides (Greek: Φωκυλίδης ὁ Μιλήσιος), Greek gnomic poet of Miletus, contemporary of Theognis of Megara, was born about 560 BC.

A few fragments of his "maxims" have survived (chiefly in the Florilegium of Stobaeus), in which he expresses his contempt for the pomps and vanities of rank and wealth, and sets forth in simple language his ideas of honour, justice and wisdom. An example is an epigram quoted by Dio Chrysostom:

And this from Phocylides: a city in good order, though small
and built on a distant crag, is mightier than foolish Nineveh.

— Or. 36.13, trans. Colburn

Aristotle also found cause to quote him:

Many things are best in the mean; I desire to be of a middle condition in my city.

— The Politics. Book Four. Ch. XI.

== Works ==
Phocylides of Miletus was once credited with writing Pseudo-Phocylides, a complete didactic poem (230 hexameters). However, that text is now considered to be the work of an Alexandrian Christian of Jewish origin who lived between 170 BC and AD 50. The Jewish element is shown in verbal agreement with passages of the Old Testament (especially the Wisdom of Sirach); the Christian by the doctrine of the immortality of the soul and the resurrection of the body. Some Jewish authorities, however, maintain that there are in reality no traces of Christian doctrine to be found in the poem, and that the author was a Jew. The poem was first printed at Venice in 1495, and was a favourite school textbook during the Reformation period.

== See also ==
- Pseudo-Phocylides
- Theognis of Megara
