= Gnomic poetry =

Meaningful opinions put into verse to aid the memory

Gnomic poetry consists of meaningful sayings put into verse to aid the memory. They were known by the Greeks as gnomes (cf. the Greek adjective γνωμικός (gnomikos) "appertaining to an opinion or aphorism"). A gnome was defined by the Elizabethan critic Henry Peacham as "a saying pertaining to the manners and common practices of men, which declareth, with an apt brevity, what in this our life ought to be done, or not done".

It belongs to the broad family of wisdom literature, which expresses general truths about the world. Topics range over the divine and secular, from moral aphorisms to hierarchical social relationships.

== Ancient Greek gnomic literature ==
The gnomic poets of Greece, who flourished in the 6th century BC, were those who arranged series of sententious maxims in verse. These were collected in the 4th century, by Lobon of Argos, an orator, but his collection has disappeared. Hesiod's Works and Days is considered to be one of the earliest works of this genre.

The chief gnomic poets were Theognis, Solon, Phocylides, Semonides of Amorgos, Demodocus, Xenophanes and Euenus. With the exception of Theognis, whose gnomes were fortunately preserved by some schoolmaster about 300 BC, only fragments of the gnomic poets have come down to us. The moral poem attributed to Phocylides, long supposed to be a masterpiece of the school, is now known to have been written by a Christian of Jewish origin in Alexandria. Of the gnomic movement typified by the moral works of the poets named above, Gilbert Murray has remarked that it receives its special expression in the conception of the Seven Wise Men, to whom such proverbs as "Know thyself" and "Nothing in excess" were popularly attributed, and whose names differed in different lists.

These gnomes or maxims were extended and put into literary shape by the poets. Fragments of Solon, Euenus, and Mimnermus have been preserved, in a very confused state, from having been written, for purposes of comparison, on the margins of the manuscripts of Theognis, whence they have often slipped into the text of that poet. Theognis enshrines his moral precepts in his elegies, and this was probably the custom of the rest; it is improbable that there ever existed a species of poetry made up entirely of successive gnomes. But the title gnomic came to be given to all poetry which dealt in a sententious way with questions of ethics. It was, unquestionably, the source from which moral philosophy was directly developed, and theorists upon life and infinity, such as Pythagoras and Xenophanes, seem to have begun their career as gnomic poets.

Gnomes, in their literary sense, belong to the dawn of literature, in their naiveté and their simplicity and moralizing. Many of the ethical reflections of the great dramatists, and in particular of Sophocles and Euripides, are gnomic distiches expanded. The ancient Greek gnomes are not all solemn; some are voluptuous and some chivalrous. Those of Demodocus of Leros had the reputation of being droll.

J. A. Symonds writes that the gnomic poets mark a transition from Homer and Hesiod to the dramatists and moralists of Attica.

== Medieval and early modern gnomic literature ==
Gnomes are frequently to be found in the ancient literatures of Arabia, Persia and India, in Anglo-Saxon poetry and in the Icelandic staves. Comparable with the Anglo-Saxon examples are the Early Welsh gnomic poems. The priamel, a brief, sententious kind of poem, which was in favor in Germany from the 12th to the 16th centuries, belonged to the true gnomic class, and was cultivated with particular success by Hans Rosenblut, the lyrical goldsmith of Nuremberg, in the 15th century. Gnomic literature, including ’’Maxims I’’ and ‘’Maxims II’’, is a genre of Medieval Literature in England.

The gnomic spirit has occasionally been displayed by poets of a homely philosophy, such as Francis Quarles (1592–1644) in England and Gui de Pibrac (1529–1584) in France. The once-celebrated Quatrains of the latter, published in 1574, enjoyed an immense success throughout Europe; they were composed in deliberate imitation of the Greek gnomic writers of the 6th century BC.

With the gnomic writings of Pibrac it was long customary to bind up those of Antoine Faber (or Favre) (1557–1624) and of Pierre Mathieu (1563–1621).
