= Demodocus (Odyssey character) =

Mythical minstrel of Alcinous

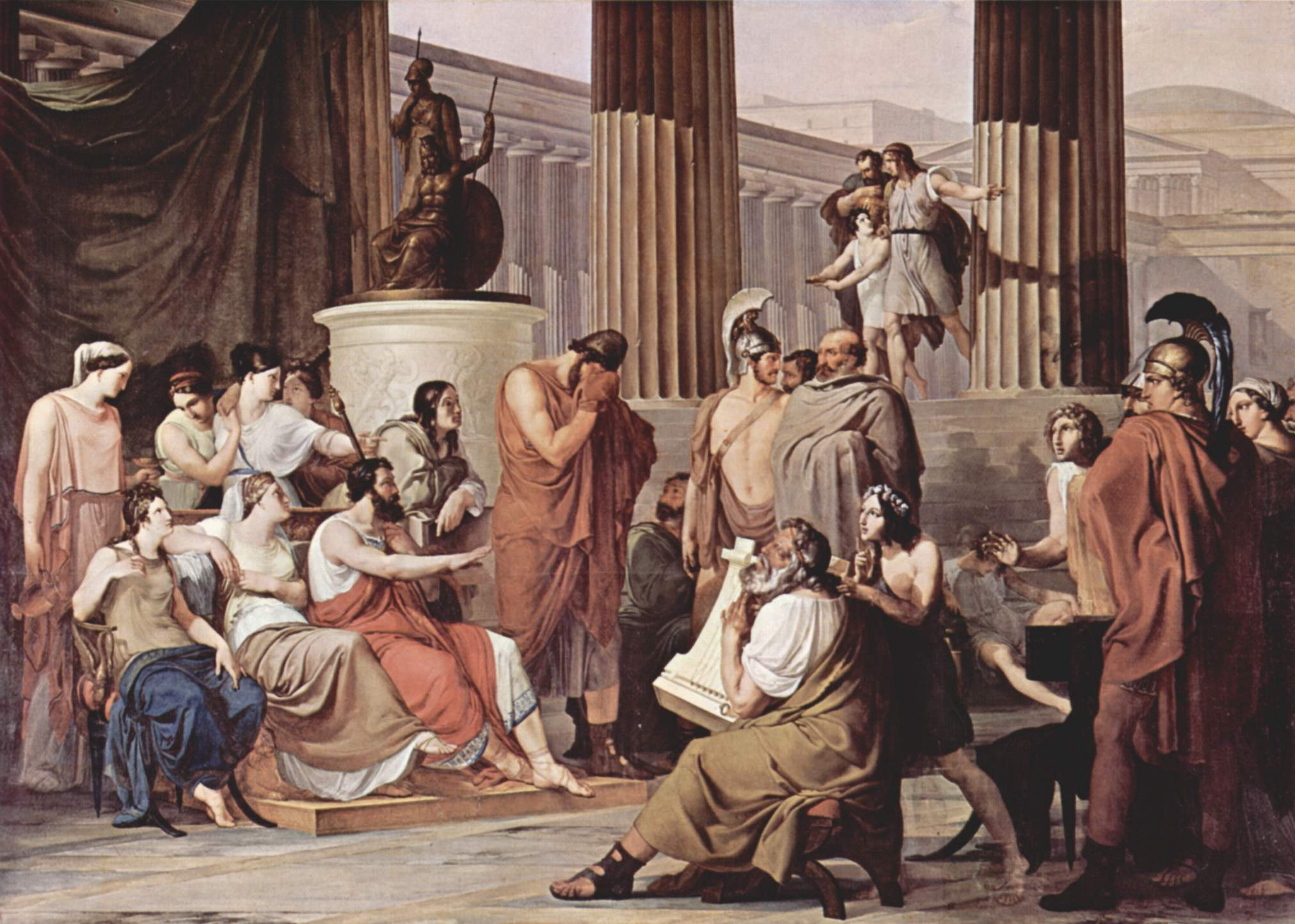
Odysseus is weeping at the court of Alcinous as the blind minstrel Demodocus sings about Odysseus and Achilles at Troy while playing the harp.

In the Odyssey by Homer, Demodocus (/dɪˈmɒdəkəs/; Ancient Greek: Δημόδοκος, romanized: Dēmódokos) is a poet who often visits the court of Alcinous, king of the Phaeacians on the island of Phaeacia (also called Scheria). During Odysseus' stay on Scherie, Demodocus performs three narrative songs.

== Description ==
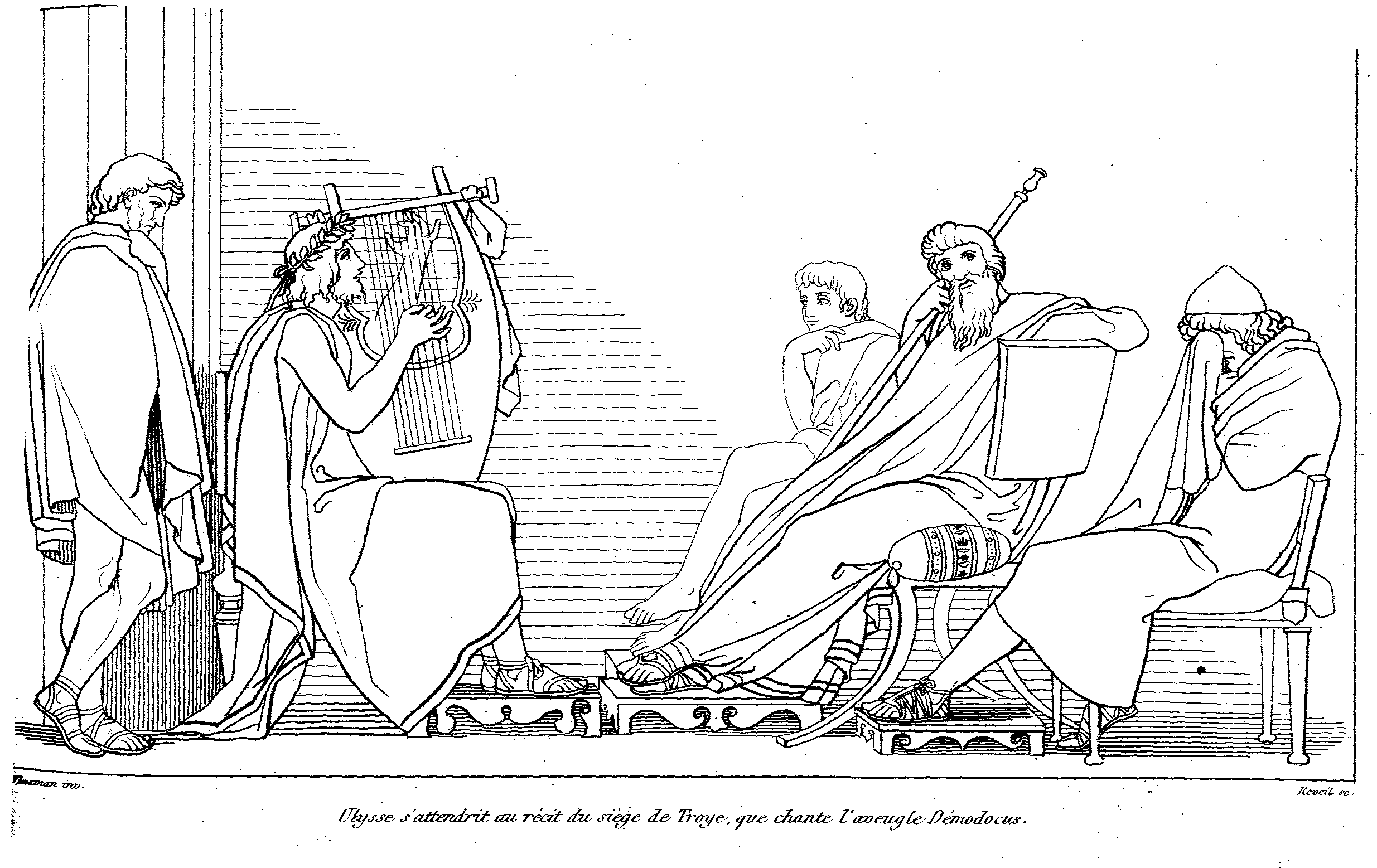
Demodocus playing the harp in an illustration of Homer's Odyssey by John Flaxman (1810)

Demodocus first appears at a feast in the hall of Alcinous, after he approved that Odysseus should be provided with a ship for a safe passage home. During the feast Demodocus sings about the disagreement between Odysseus and Achilles at Troy. Everyone enjoys the singing except for Odysseus who bursts into tears because of the pain and suffering of which the song reminds him. Odysseus would raise his cup and pour libations to the gods every time there was a pause in the singing but when Demodocus began again Odysseus would pull his cloak over his head to hide his tears. Only Alcinous noticed Odysseus' weeping and stopped the feast and suggests that everyone go outdoors to participate in athletic contests.

The games end with dancing and another song from Demodocus. This time he sang of the love between Ares and Aphrodite. Hephaestus was Aphrodite's husband and found out about the affair because Helios told him that he had seen Ares and Aphrodite lying together. Hephaestus sets up an inescapable trap over his bed. When Ares and Aphrodite go to bed, they are snared in the trap and caught by Hephaestus. At dinner, after the sun had gone down, Odysseus asks Demodocus to sing his third song. Odysseus cut off a sizable piece of pork from his own portion and told a herald to bring it to Demodocus. Demodocus was grateful and began to sing. He sang of the Trojan horse and the sack of Troy. Again, Odysseus weeps uncontrollably and is able to hide it from everyone except Alcinous who ends the singing and asks Odysseus who he really is.

Demodocus is described as blind: "The squire now came, leading their favorite bard, whom the Muse loved above all others, [al]though she had mingled good and evil in her gifts, robbing him of his eyes but granting him the gift of sweet song."

== Namesake ==
- 11429 Demodokus, Jovian asteroid
