= Hachi: A Dog's Tale =

2009 drama film directed by Lasse Hallström

- Theatrical release poster
- Directed by: Lasse Hallström
- Screenplay by: Stephen P. Lindsey
- Based on: Hachikō Monogatari by Kaneto Shindô
- Produced by: Richard Gere; Bill Johnson
- Starring: Richard Gere; Joan Allen; Erick Avari; Jason Alexander
- Cinematography: Ron Fortunato
- Edited by: Kristina Boden
- Music by: Jan A. P. Kaczmarek; Harry Gregson-Williams
- Production companies: Stage 6 Films; Affirm Films; Hachiko, LLC; Grand Army Entertainment; Opperman Viner Chrystyn Entertainment; Scion Films; Inferno Production
- Distributed by: Sony Pictures Entertainment (United States); Entertainment Film Distributors (United Kingdom)
- Release dates: June 8, 2009 (Seattle); August 8, 2009 (Japan); March 12, 2010 (UK)
- Running time: 97 minutes
- Countries: United States; United Kingdom
- Language: English
- Budget: $16 million
- Box office: $46.7 million

Hachi: A Dog's Tale is a 2009 drama film and a remake of Seijirō Kōyama's 1987 Japanese film Hachikō Monogatari. The original film told the true story of the Akita dog named Hachikō who lived in Japan 1923–1935. Hachi: A Dog's Tale is an updated American adaptation based on the Japanese film.

This version, which places it in a modern American context, was directed by Lasse Hallström, written by Stephen P. Lindsey and Kaneto Shindo, and produced by Richard Gere, Bill Johnson and Vicki Shigekuni Wong. The film stars Gere, Joan Allen, Sarah Roemer, Jason Alexander, and Cary-Hiroyuki Tagawa.

Hachi: A Dog's Tale premiered at the Seattle International Film Festival on June 13, 2009, and its first theatrical release was in Japan on August 8, 2009. The film was given a UK theatrical release on March 12, 2010, courtesy of Entertainment Film Distributors, and opened in more than 60 countries throughout 2009 and 2010. By the end of September 2010, the film's foreign box office returns had totalled more than $45 million. Sony Pictures Entertainment decided to forgo a U.S. theatrical release, bringing the film out on DVD on March 9, 2010 and eventually selling it to the Hallmark Channel, where it debuted on September 26, 2010.

== Plot ==
Ronnie says to his class that his personal hero is his grandfather Parker Wilson's dog Hachi, whose story he starts narrating.

Parker Wilson, a professor who commutes to Providence, Rhode Island, finds a dog lost on the railway station in Bedridge and temporarily takes it home. The dog remains unclaimed but grows close to Parker, who takes it everywhere with him. Parker's Japanese friend Ken says the dog is a breed called Akita and the character on its collar tag is "Hachi" ("Eight" in Japanese). Parker thus names the dog "Hachi" as it is a lucky number. Parker's wife Cate Wilson eventually warms to Hachi but he sleeps outside in his own shed. Parker tries in vain to train Hachi in normal dog things like fetching a ball. However, Ken explains that Akita dogs cannot be trained; if Hachi fetches the ball, it will be for a special reason. Hachi digs under the fence and follows Parker to the station. He refuses to go home, and Parker misses the train. He hands him over to Cate and catches the next train.

At 5:00 pm, he returns from the train and is surprised to find Hachi waiting for him at the station. He is even more surprised to learn that he came to the station all by himself. A daily routine begins: the two walk to the station, Parker leaves from the train, Hachi goes home, and returns at 5:00pm to receive Parker. Later, Parker's daughter Andy marries Michael, and Hachi is in the family marriage photograph. Soon after the marriage, Andy announces that she is pregnant.

However, one morning, Hachi behaves strangely at home and then follows Parker to the railway station with the ball. Parker throws the ball toward him, and much to his delight, Hachi fetches it for the first time. They play for a while, and Parker eventually puts the ball in his pocket and begins to leave. Hachi barks and watches Parker's train leaving. Hours later, while still holding the ball, Parker suffers a fatal stroke in his classroom and collapses; Hachi waits for him at the railway station. At 9:30pm, Michael comes to the railway station and takes Hachi home. From his shed, Hachi watches the family mourning Parker. The next morning, Parker's family members and friends gather for his funeral while Hachi goes to the station to wait. Soon, Cate sells the house and moves away, and Hachi goes to live with Andy and Michael and their infant son Ronnie. However, Hachi follows the train tracks to Bedridge.

Andy and Michael find him and take him back to their house. Realizing that Hachi is pining for Parker, Andy opens the gate for him. Hachi gratefully licks her hand and runs back to the Bedridge station. Hachi waits at the station every day, while hot-dog seller Jasjeet and the other passers-by feed him. Soon, a reporter writes a story about Hachi, and people start sending him money and cards. Ken reads Hachi's news, travels to Bedridge and speaks to Hachi in Japanese: he too misses his best friend. On Parker's tenth death anniversary, Cate arrives in town to visit his grave, where Ken is present, too. She is moved to see an elderly Hachi still waiting at the station for his friend. Hachi later dies at his place in the station, while still waiting for Parker. In his last moments, Hachi dreams that Parker finally returns.

In the present, Ronnie says that his grandfather and Hachi taught him the meaning of "loyalty", which means "you should never forget anyone you have loved". He concludes that Hachi will forever be his personal hero and the class applauds. From the school bus, Ronnie is met by Michael and a tiny new puppy who is also named Hachi. Ronnie and the puppy travel through the same tracks Hachi traveled years ago.

== Cast ==
=== Main ===
- Layla / Chico / Forrest – Hachi Wilson
- Richard Gere – Professor Parker Wilson
- Joan Allen – Cate Wilson
- Sarah Roemer – Andy Wilson
- Robbie Collier Sublett – Michael

=== Supporting ===
- Kevin DeCoste – Ronnie, son of Michael and Andy
- Erick Avari – Jasjeet, the Indian hot-dog cart vendor
- Jason Alexander – Carl Boilins, the train station master
- Cary-Hiroyuki Tagawa – Ken Fujiyoshi, the Japanese professor who is Parker's friend
- Davenia McFadden – Mary-Ann, the bookstore owner
- Tora Hallström – Heather, one of Ronnie's classmates

== Historical background ==
The movie was based on the real Japanese Akita dog Hachikō, who was born in Ōdate, Japan, in 1923. After the death of his owner, Ueno Hidesaburō, in 1925, Hachikō returned to the Shibuya train station the next day and every day after that for the next nine years until he died in March 1935. A bronze statue of Hachikō is in front of the Shibuya train station in his honor, in the spot where he waited. Hachikō is known in Japanese as chūken Hachikō (忠犬ハチ公) "faithful dog Hachikō", hachi meaning "eight" and kō meaning "affection." The film ends with a text panel summarizing the story of the real Hachikō, a photo of the dog and a shot of the bronze statue. According to the movie's closing cards, the real Hachikō died in March 1934, while the earlier movie, Hachikō Monogatari, and other sources state that his actual death was in March 1935 (9 years and 9 months after Professor Ueno's death).

== Production ==
The majority of filming took place in Bristol and Woonsocket, Rhode Island. The only spoken reference to the actual location where filming took place is when the newspaper reporter Teddy states he works for the Woonsocket Call; The Call is Woonsocket's daily newspaper.

Additional locations included the University of Rhode Island in Kingston; along the Providence and Worcester Railroad Mechanical; and the Columbus Theater in Providence. A second production unit filmed scenes on-location in Japan. Footage was shot at the Reynolds Elementary School in Bristol, which the Bristol Warren Regional School District closed the same year the film was released, later converting it into its administration offices.

The color in scenes filmed from the dog's point of view is desaturated almost to black-and-white. Although there are several scenes from Hachi's POV, the film never puts human dialogue in Hachi's mind/mouth.

Animal trainer Mark Harden and his team trained the three Akitas – Layla, Chico and Forrest – who played the role of Hachi in the movie. Harden adopted Chico after the movie was completed. Trainer David Allsberry adopted Layla after the shoot. New York Times reporter David Itzkoff repeated Richard Gere's description of the challenging process of getting to know his canine co-stars:

There was, Mr. Gere said, "a certain amount of anxiety, of would we get along? They cannot be bought." But after about three days, he said, "One of the dogs came over and put her head right on my lap. And that was a big moment - I was accepted in the pack."

When David Itzkoff wrote about the film in a September 24, 2010, article headlined "Film has Two Big Names and a Dog but No Big Screens", he reported that Sony refused to comment on its decision not to release the picture to theaters in the United States.

== Reception ==
Hachi: A Dog's Tale received mixed-to-positive reviews from critics and audiences. Review aggregator website Rotten Tomatoes reported that 64% of critics have given the film a positive review based on 28 reviews, with an average rating of 5.9/10.

Christopher Lloyd of the Sarasota Herald Tribune gave the film 4 out of 5 stars, noting "Hachi: A Dog's Tale is unapologetically a tear-jerker. You might resent being emotionally manipulated by this film, but I challenge even the most hard-hearted moviegoer not to spill some saltwater while watching it."

Variety's Alissa Simon described the film as a "Sentimental, repetitive tale... [harking] back to the values, production and otherwise, of an earlier era. [...] It's family-friendly rather than family fare; kids are likely to be bored stiff. [...] Even so, the dog's silent distress and dignity will move all but the hardest hearts. [The] pic's main problem is that its human story lacks drama; Hachi's the central attraction."

Joly Herman of Common Sense Media gave this a film rate four stars out of five, describing as "Dramatic story of a dog's devotion is emotionally intense." Cath Clarke of The Guardian gave a film two stars out of five, saying that "Lasse Hallström dishes up more classy mediocrity with this brazenly uncomplicated treat for dog lovers."

== Commemoration of American film's Hachiko ==
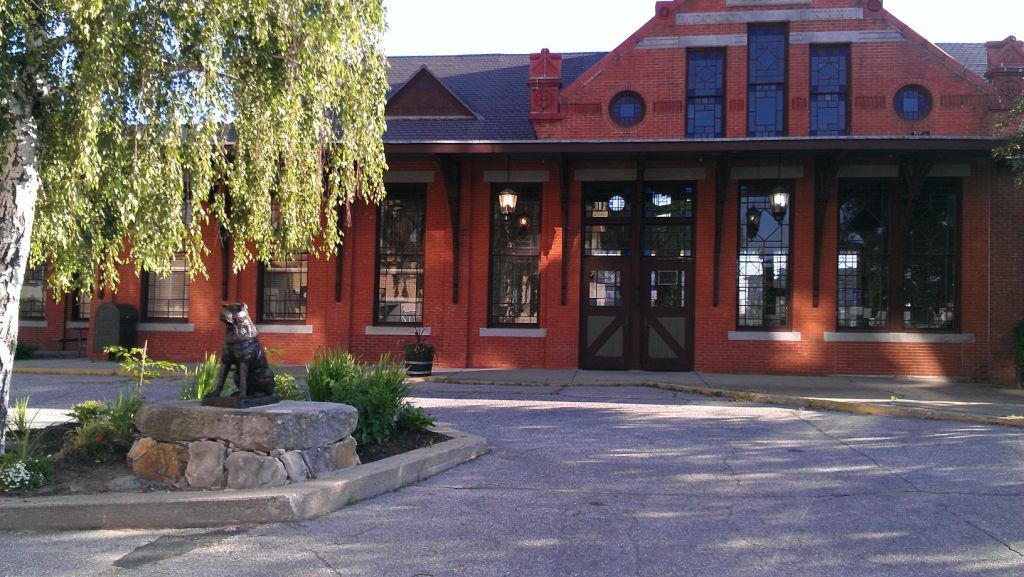
Statue of Hachi in Woonsocket Depot

On May 19, 2012, a bronze replica of the original Hachiko statue was placed at the train depot at Woonsocket Depot Square, Woonsocket, Rhode Island, where the movie was filmed. The train depot at One Depot Square was renamed Hachiko Place. The Rhode Island statue's dedication ceremony was part of the Cherry Blossom Festival held in three Rhode Island towns: Pawtucket, Central Falls, and Woonsocket. Dignitaries including the Mayor of Woonsocket and the Consul General of Japan attended the ceremony. Two cherry blossom trees were planted by the statue. A New Jersey visitor's Akita-mix (also named Hachi) was invited to participate at the ribbon-cutting ceremony as a "real-life stand-in for Hachiko".

The Blackstone Valley Heritage Corridor and the Blackstone Valley Tourism Council have created a handout with useful info for people who want to take a tour of the movie locations for "Hachi".

== Score ==
The film score of Hachi was composed by Jan A. P. Kaczmarek.

=== Track list ===
1. "Japan" (03:26)
2. "New Home" (01:47)
3. "The Foot" (02:40)
4. "Dance Rehearsal" (02:15)
5. "Storm and the Rescue" (01:36)
6. "The Second Dance" (00:51)
7. "Under the Fence" (01:51)
8. "Treats from Cate" (01:52)
9. "Parker's Dance Played on Piano" (03:42)
10. "Parker and Hachi Walk to the Station" (02:04)
11. "Baby" (01:23)
12. "Marriage Bath" (03:27)
13. "Fetch" (02:12)
14. "To Train Together" (03:25)
15. "Packing Boxes" (02:15)
16. "Parker and Hachi" (03:28)
17. "Hachiko Runs Away" (04:27)
18. "Memory of the Storm" (01:36)
19. "Hachi Waiting for Parker Again" (02:51)
20. "Hachi's Last Trip to the Station" (02:06)
21. "Goodbye" (02:10)
22. "Hachi, Parker, Cate and Memories" (03:58)
23. "Hachi's Voice (Version 1)" (Bonus track) (00:14)
24. "Hachi's Voice (Version 2)" (Bonus track) (00:10)
25. "Hachi's Voice (Version 3)" (Bonus track) (00:11)
26. "Hachi's Voice (Version 4)" (Bonus track) (00:09)
- The Japanese version uses "Wasurenai yo" by Aoyama Thelma as its theme song.
