= Hachiko Waits =

2004 children's book by Lesléa Newman

- Author: Lesléa Newman
- Cover artist: Machiyo Kodaira
- Language: English
- Genre: Children's - Young Adult
- Publisher: Henry Holt and Company, LLC
- Publication date: Fall 2004
- Media type: Print (Hardback)
- Pages: 96
- ISBN: 0-8050-7336-1
- OCLC: 54407914
- LC Class: PZ7.N47988 Hac 2004

Hachiko Waits is a children's book, written by Lesléa Newman and illustrated by Machiyo Kodaira. It uses the true story of Hachikō the Akita dog from Japan and adds Yasuo, a young boy, to the story. It won several awards.

== Plot ==
Professor Hidesaburō Ueno and his dog Hachikō follow the same schedule every day. In April 1924, when Hachikō was six months old, he got out the gate and followed the Professor to the train station, despite the Professor's commanding him to go back home. At the train station, the Station Master, Mr. Yoshikawa, agrees to watch Hachikō until the Professor returns. There Yasuo, a six-year-old boy, meets Hachikō. The dog waits until five minutes to three o'clock, when the Professor's train arrives.This routine continues every day for a year. However, when the train arrives in the afternoon, the Professor is not on it. Yasuo discovers that he has suffered a heart attack and died. Hachikō waits in the station until the last train arrives at midnight; then Yasuo, with much difficulty, takes him to his house. However, Hachikō escapes the next morning; and at five minutes to three, he is in the station waiting for the Professor.

Yasuo and the Station Master take care of Hachikō for the next ten years, as he comes to the station every afternoon to await the Professor's arrival. The newspaper writes an article about Hachikō, and he becomes famous throughout Japan. On the day Hachikō dies, the sixteen-year-old Yasuo meets a famous artist, who wants to carve a statue of the devoted dog. Once complete, the statue becomes famous as well; and by it, Yasuo meets the girl whom he marries ten years later.

== Awards ==
- Winner, Dog Writer's Association of America Best Book of Fiction, 2005
- Winner, Alabama Emphasis on Reading Children's Choice Book Award, 2005–2006
- Third Place Winner, Rebecca Caudill Young Readers Award of Illinois, 2007–2008
- Honor Book, National Christian Schools Association Children's Crown Award, 2007–2008
- Honor Book, ASPCA Henry Bergh Award, 2005
- Honor Book, Kiriyama Prize, 2005
- Finalist, Indiana Young Hoosier Book Award, 2007–2008
- Finalist, Iowa Children's Choice Award 2007–2008
- Finalist, Kansas William Allen White Children's Book Award, 2006–2007
- Bank Street College of Education Best Children's Books of the Year, 2005
