= Statue of Hachikō =

Statue in Tokyo, Japan

- 忠犬ハチ公像 (Chūken Hachikō-zō) (Japanese)
- Closeup of the statue in 2024
- Artist: Takeshi Andō
- Year: 1948
- Completion date: 1948
- Medium: Bronze sculpture
- Subject: Hachikō
- Location: Tokyo, Japan; 35°39′32.6″N 139°42′2.1″E

A statue of the Akita dog Hachikō, remembered for his unwavering loyalty to his deceased owner, is installed outside Tokyo's Shibuya Station, in Japan.

== History ==
In April 1934, a bronze statue based in his likeness sculpted by Teru Andō was erected at Shibuya Station, and Hachikō himself was present at its unveiling. The statue was recycled for the war effort during World War II.

In 1948, the Society for Recreating the Hachikō Statue commissioned Takeshi Andō, son of the original artist, to make a second statue. When the new statue appeared, a dedication ceremony occurred. The new statue, which was erected in August 1948, still stands and is a popular meeting spot. The station entrance near this statue is named Hachikō-guchi ("Hachikō Entrance/Exit"), and is one of Shibuya Station's five exits.

The Japan Times played an April Fools' joke on readers by reporting that the bronze statue was stolen a little before 2:00 AM on April 1, 2007, by "suspected metal thieves". The false story told a very detailed account of an elaborate theft by men wearing khaki workers' uniforms who secured the area with orange safety cones and obscured the theft with blue vinyl tarps. The "crime" was allegedly recorded on security cameras.

Hachikō's birthplace of Ōdate considered borrowing the statue during redevelopment of the Shibuya Station ahead of the 2020 Summer Olympics.

== Reception ==
Time Out Tokyo says the statue "might be Japan's most famous example of public art". In 2019, Free Malaysia Today described the statue as "a 'must' visit when in Tokyo".

== See also ==
- 1934 in art
- 1948 in art

== Gallery ==
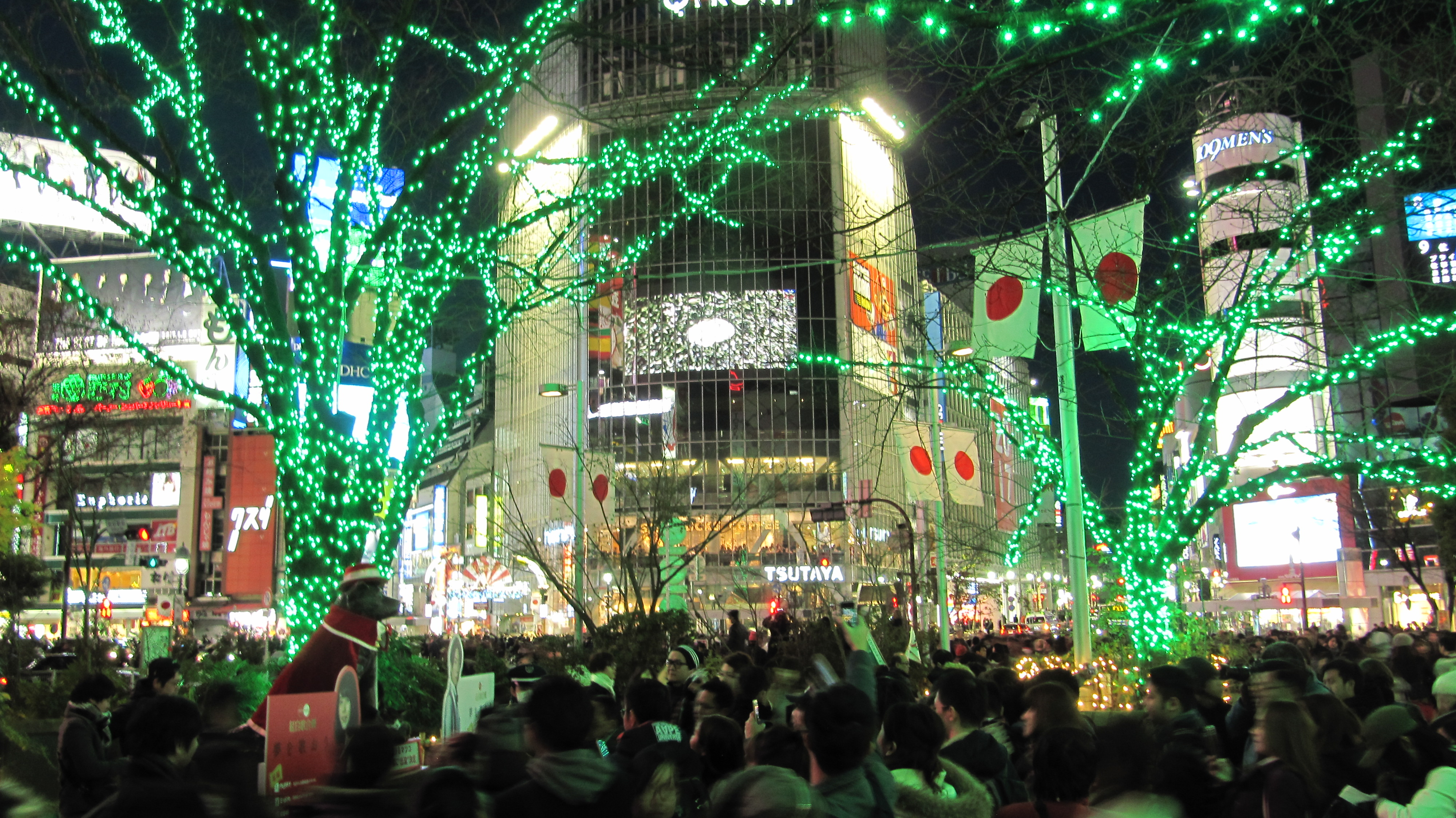
The statue surrounded by a crowd of people in 2016

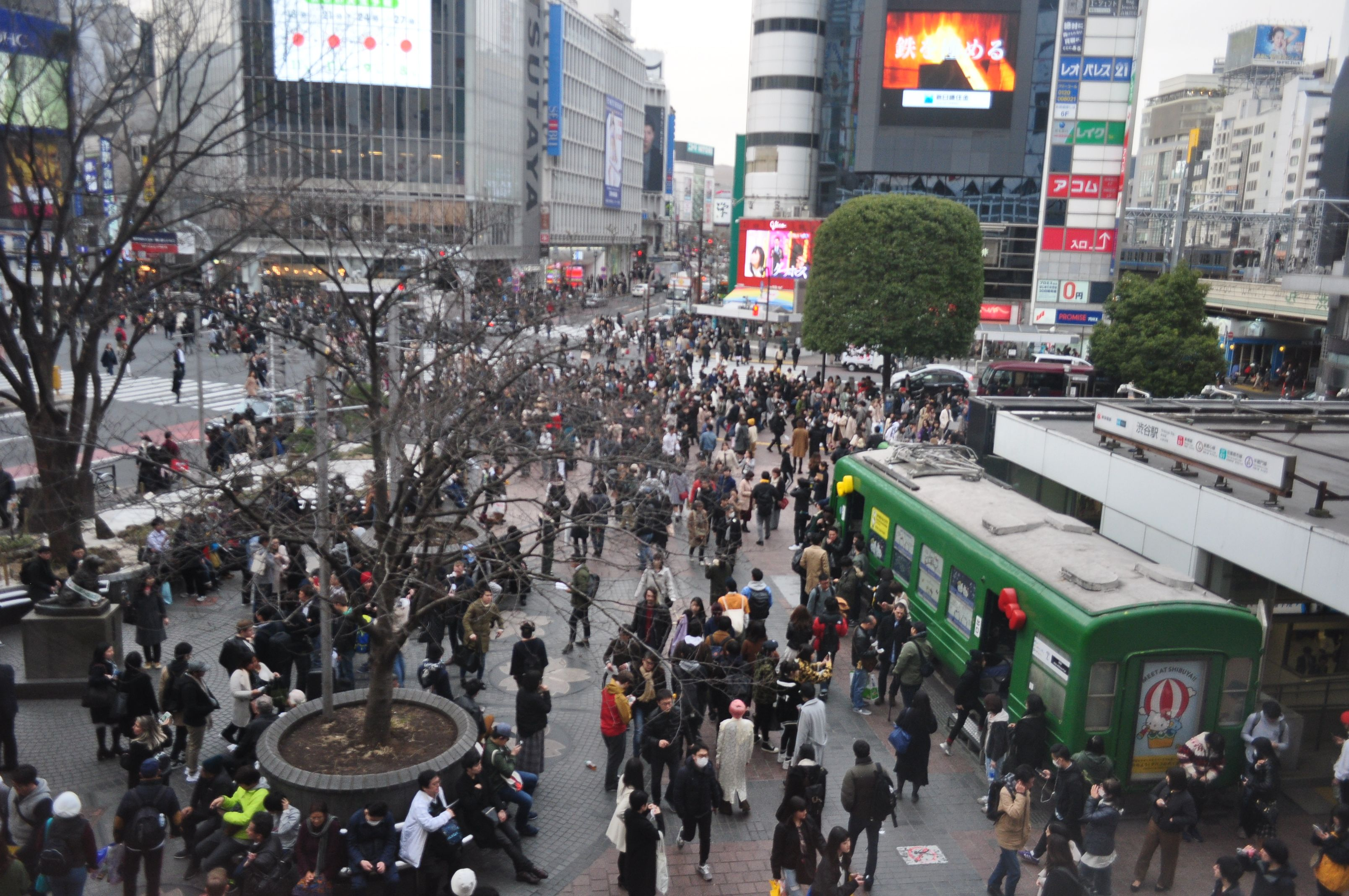
Shibuya Hachikō Front Square (Hachikō-mae hiroba), with the statue in lower-left.

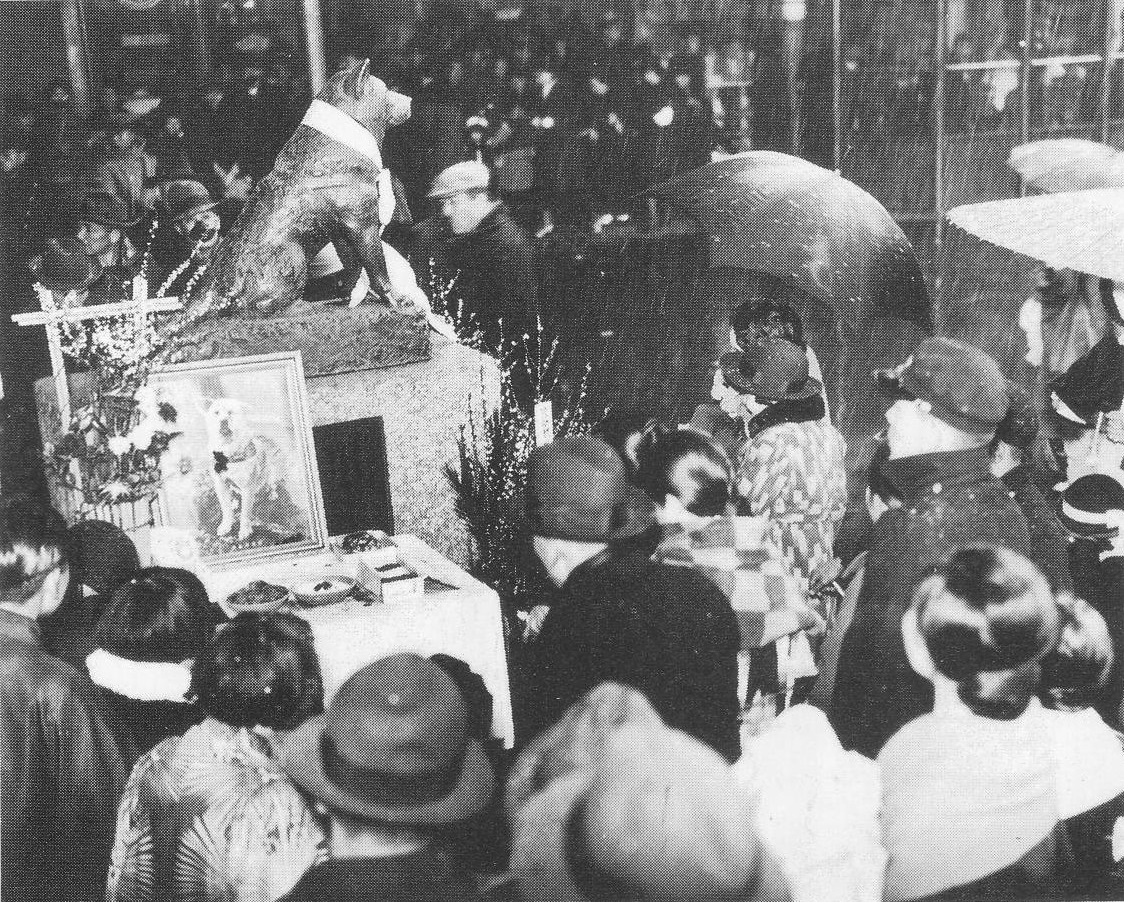
Crowd of people gathered around the original statue of Hachikō in honor of the one year anniversary of his death on March 8, 1936.

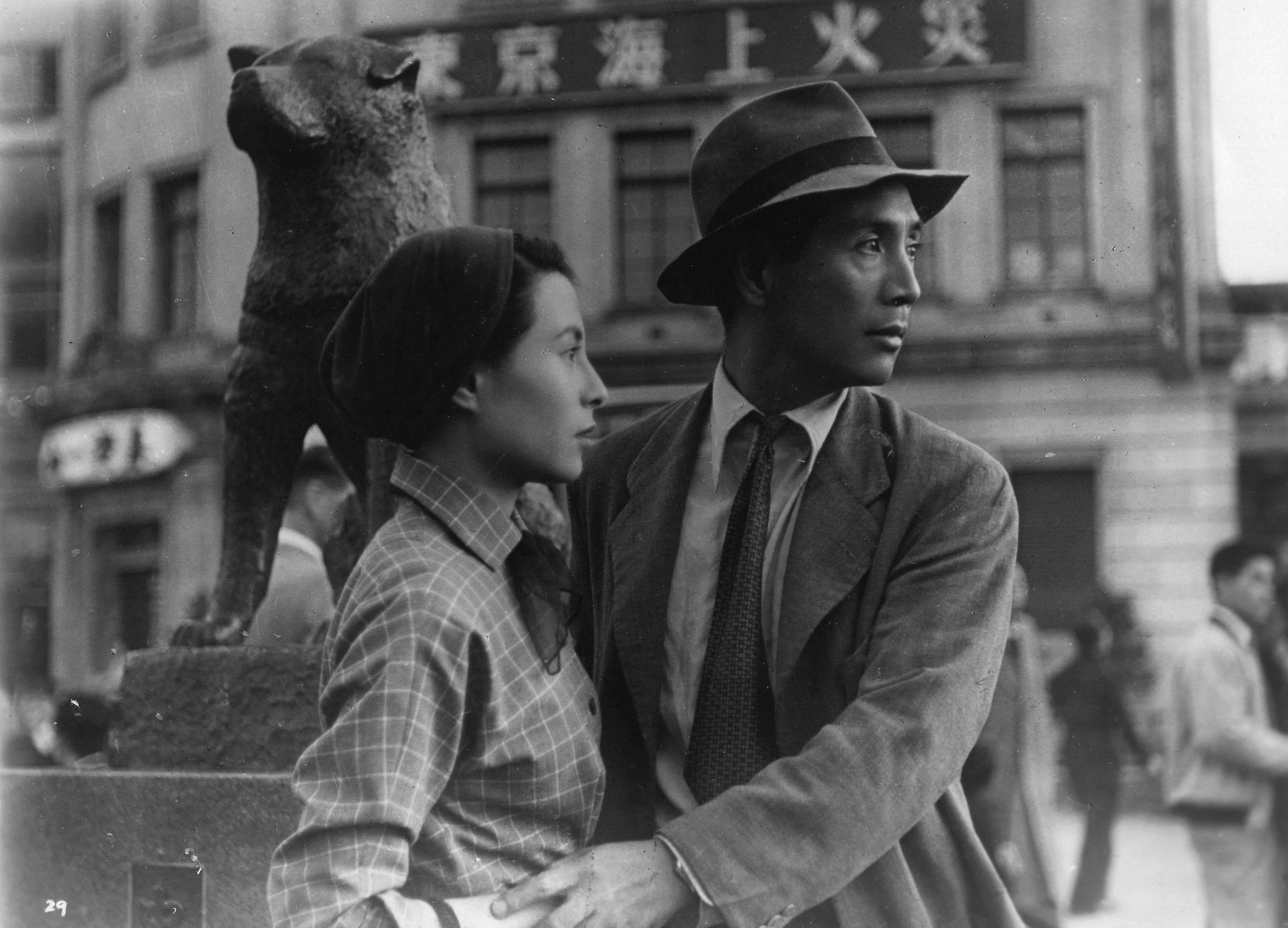
Still from 1953 film Love Letter
