= Hometown (film) =

1983 film

- DVD cover
- Directed by: Seijirō Kōyama
- Written by: Seijirō Kōyama
- Starring: Yoshi Katō
- Cinematography: Fuminori Minami
- Release dates: July 1983 (Moscow); 15 September 1983 (Japan)
- Running time: 106 minutes
- Country: Japan
- Language: Japanese

Hometown (Japanese: ふるさと, Hepburn: Furusato) is a 1983 Japanese drama film directed by Seijirō Kōyama. It was entered into the 13th Moscow International Film Festival where Yoshi Katō won the award for Best Actor.

== Cast ==
- Yoshi Katō as Denzo
- Hiroyuki Nagato as Denroku
- Tokue Hanazawa as Shop owner
- Fumie Kashiyama as Hana
- Kirin Kiki as Yoshi
- Kōjirō Kusanagi as Masa
- Gin Maeda as Teacher Tani
- Nana Okada as Fuku
- Saburō Shinoda as Denzo as a young man
- Hiromitsu Suzuki as Sugiyama
