= Hachikō Monogatari =

- Theatrical release poster
- Directed by: Seijirō Kōyama
- Screenplay by: Kaneto Shindo
- Story by: Kaneto Shindo
- Produced by: Toshio Nabeshima
- Starring: Tatsuya Nakadai; Kaoru Yachigusa; Mako Ishino; Masumi Harukawa
- Cinematography: Shinsaku Himeda
- Edited by: Mitsuo Kondō
- Music by: Tetsuji Hayashi
- Distributed by: Shochiku-Fuji Company
- Release date: 1 August 1987
- Running time: 107 minutes
- Country: Japan
- Language: Japanese
- Box office: ¥3.4 billion

Hachikō Monogatari (Japanese: ハチ公物語, Hepburn: Hachikō Monogatari; The Story of Hachikō) is a 1987 Japanese drama film directed by Seijirō Kōyama and written by Kaneto Shindo. Starring Tatsuya Nakadai, Kaoru Yachigusa, Mako Ishino and Masumi Harukawa, the film depicts the true story of Hachikō, a loyal Akita dog who continued to wait for his owner, Professor Hidesaburō Ueno, to return from work nine years following Ueno's death. It was the top Japanese film at the box office the year of its release and received the Yamaji Fumiko Film Award.

== Plot ==
On November 10, 1923, a litter of Akita puppies are born on a farm in Ōdate, Akita Prefecture, Japan. Mase, an agricultural engineer, decides to phone his mentor, agricultural professor Hidejiro Ueno of Shibuya, Tokyo, to let him know that he can have a male purebred Akita from the litter. Mase is answered by Ueno's daughter Chizuko Ueno, who becomes excited to take the puppy in. At her insistence, Ueno adopts the dog, although Ueno's wife disapproves of them getting another dog after the death of their previous Akita, Gonsuke.

The puppy arrives at Shibuya Station, having been transported there from Ōdate via a two-day train ride. Chizuko chooses to go to a concert with her fiancé Tsumoru rather than collect the dog. Saikichi, a servant of the Ueno family, and Kiku, who brought Gonsuke to the crematory, fetch the puppy instead. Saikichi and Kiku assume the dog to be dead, but the puppy is proven to be alive when he drinks from a saucer of milk offered by Ueno. That night, Tsumoru informs Ueno that Chizuko is pregnant and that Tsumoru is responsible.

Ueno names the dog "Hachikō", or "Hachi" for short. Tsumoru and Chizuko marry and move away, leaving Ueno, his wife, and their servants to care for Hachi. As Hachi matures, Ueno develops a bond with him; he takes Hachi on walks, removes fleas from his fur, bathes with him, and on one rainy night, takes Hachi out of his doghouse and brings him inside their home to dry and sleep. Ueno commutes daily to work, and Hachi leaves the house to greet him at the end of each day at Shibuya Station, a habit which is noticed by two street vendors who sell food near the station.

On May 21, 1925, Ueno suddenly dies while giving a lecture to his class. Following Ueno's wake, a distressed Hachi breaks free from his chain and trails behind Ueno's funeral procession to Shibuya Station. Ueno's wife sells their house and asks an uncle in Asakusa to take Hachi in before moving back to her hometown of Taiji, Wakayama. However, Hachi finds his way back to Ueno's home in Shibuya, which is now occupied by new owners, one of whom dislikes dogs. Though he is briefly taken in by Kiku and his wife, Hachi is soon left without a home, and waits at Shibuya Station at the same time every day for Ueno to return from work.

Years pass and the street vendors continue to take notice of Hachi at the train station every day, and offer him food. A story about Hachi is published in The Asahi Shimbun, prompting Ueno's wife to return to Shibuya. She attempts to bring Hachi to an inn, but Hachi flees, returning to the vendors. Hachi waits at Shibuya Station each day, regardless of the weather, until his death on March 8, 1935. Upon dying, Hachi joyfully reunites with Ueno in the afterlife.

== Cast ==
| Actor | Role |
|---|---|
| Tatsuya Nakadai | Hidesaburō Ueno |
| Kaoru Yachigusa | Shizuko Ueno |
| Mako Ishino | Chizuko Ueno |
| Toshirō Yanagiba | Tsumoru |
| Masumi Harukawa | Okichi |
| Taiji Tonoyama | Hashimoto |
| Yoshi Katō | Kondo |
| Hisashi Igawa | Maekawa |
| Shigeru Izumiya | Yasui |
| Kei Yamamoto | Serizawa |
| Kumeko Urabe | Tobacco shop owner |
| Chōei Takahashi | Mase |
| Saburō Ishikura | Machida |
| Shirō Kishibe | Customer |
| Hairi Katagiri | Oyoshi, maid |
| Takuji Aoki | Taku Aoki |

== Crew ==
| Technician | Role |
|---|---|
| Kazuyoshi Okuyama | Executive Producer |
| Jun'ichi Shindō | Producer |
| Mitsui Company Ltd., Shōchiku Eiga, Tokyu Group | Production Companies |
| Kazuhiko Fujiwara, Yoshinobu Nishioka | Art Direction |
| Kenichi Benitani | Sound Recordist |
| Tadaomi Miya | Dog Trainer |

== Reception ==
Hachikō Monogatari was the number one Japanese film on the Japanese market in 1987, earning ¥2 billion in distributor rental income and ¥3.4 billion in gross receipts.

== Remakes ==
An American production, titled Hachi: A Dog's Tale, starring Richard Gere, Joan Allen and Sarah Roemer, was released in 2009.

A Chinese remake, Hachiko, starring Joan Chen, was released in 2023.
