= Hidesaburō Ueno =

Japanese agricultural scientist and owner of Hachikō (1872–1925)

- 上野 英三郎
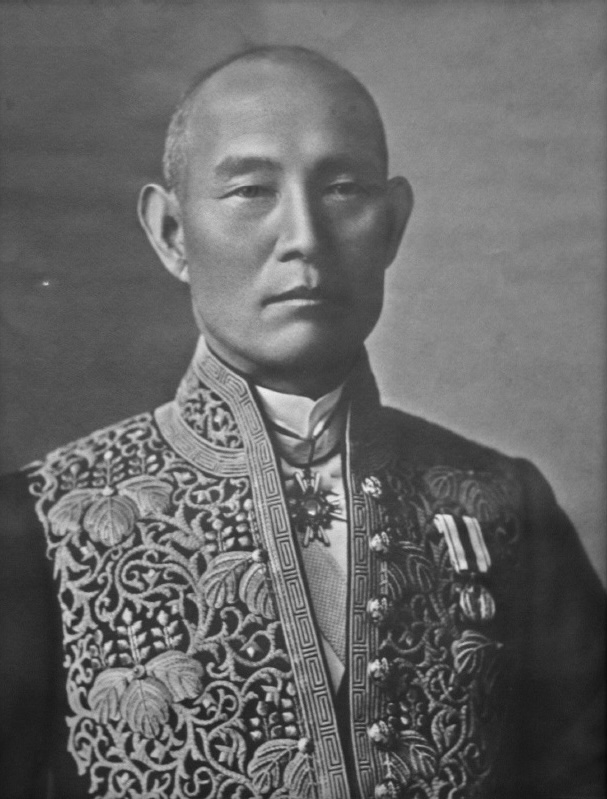
- Born: January 19, 1872; Hisai, Japan
- Died: May 21, 1925 (aged 53); Tokyo Imperial University, Japan
- Resting place: Aoyama Cemetery
- Occupation: Agricultural scientist
- Known for: Owner of Hachikō
- Partner: Yaeko Sakano (1915–1925)
- Awards: Senior Fourth Rank (1922) and Order of the Sacred Treasure, 3rd Class (1922)

Academic background
- Education: Agricultural engineering Tokyo Imperial University

Academic work
- Institutions: Tokyo Imperial University
- Main interests: Agricultural engineering

Hidesaburō Ueno (上野 英三郎, Ueno Hidesaburō; January 19, 1872 – May 21, 1925) (Note: In Tokyo Teikokudaigaku Jinjiroku (『東京帝国大学人事録』), the employment records of the University of Tokyo, his name was written as Hidesamurō 上野英三郎. His first name is not Eizaburō as often cited.) was a Japanese agricultural scientist best known as the owner of Hachikō, a devoted Akita dog.

== Life and career ==
Ueno was born on January 19, 1872, in Hisai (present-day Tsu), Mie Prefecture. In 1895, he graduated from Tokyo Imperial University's agriculture department, and then entered graduate school to study agricultural engineering and farm implement research. He finished his graduate work in July 1900 and began teaching at Tokyo Imperial University, as an assistant professor. In 1902, he became an associate professor in the agricultural university. He studied in France, Germany, and the United States from 1907 to 1910 and developed an irrigation system no one else could replicate.

Ueno is known as the pioneer of agricultural engineering in Japan. He trained over 3,000 people in that field, including most of the heads of the cultivated land in every prefecture in Japan. His students were very devoted to him and started a memorial fund after he died.

He made efforts toward the education of technical experts in the field of arable land readjustment: studying drainage and reclamation engineering. This technology was used for the imperial capital revival, after the 1923 Great Kantō earthquake.

In 1916, he became Professor of Imperial University at the university agriculture department. He took charge of lectures and provided an agricultural engineering specialization program. Ueno died of a cerebral hemorrhage on May 21, 1925, while in a colleague's office, not while giving a lecture nor in a faculty meeting, though he had been at a faculty meeting that very morning. Ueno was later buried at Aoyama Cemetery.

== Hachikō ==
His dog, Hachikō, an Akita, became famous for waiting for him every day at the train station even though he had already died. The dog continued to do so until his own death, nine years later. Hachikō is buried beside Ueno in Aoyama Cemetery, Tokyo, Japan. A bronze statue commemorating the dog was set up in front of the Shibuya Station in 1934, a year before his death on March 8, 1935. His story has been the subject of numerous books and films.

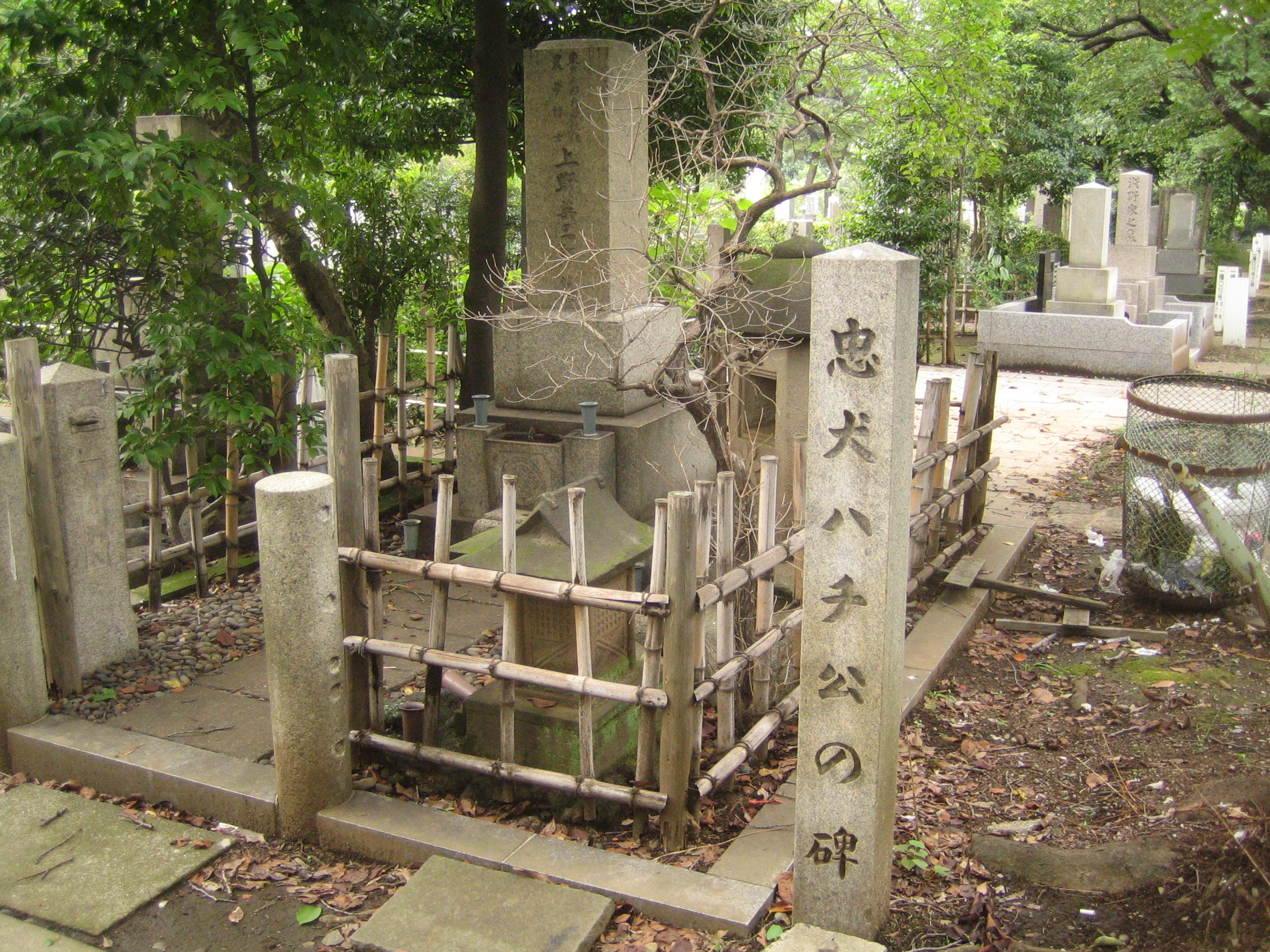
Grave of Hidesaburō Ueno and grave of Hachikō (right stele), located at Aoyama Cemetery (青山霊園) Minami-Aoyama, Minato, Tokyo

On March 9, 2015, the Faculty of Agriculture of the University of Tokyo unveiled a bronze statue depicting Ueno returning to meet Hachikō at the University of Tokyo, Japan. The statue was sculpted by Tsutomo Ueda from Nagoya and depicts a very excited Hachikō jumping up to greet his master at the end of a workday. Ueno is dressed in a hat, suit, and trench coat, with his briefcase placed on the ground. Hachikō wears a studded harness as seen in his last photos.

== Yaeko Sakano ==
Yaeko Sakano (坂野 八重子, Sakano Yaeko; 1885 – April 30, 1961), (Note: Yaeko's maiden name is unknown. While she often went by Yaeko Ueno, she could not legally take that name nor inherit Ueno's property because they were not married. However, she was often referred to as his wife and by the surname Ueno. They had no children. Ueno adopted a girl named Tsuruko, birth surname unknown. Tsuruko married a man named Yasushi Sakano. Yaeko legally adopted Sakano and then legally took the surname Sakano. Therefore, she was also known by the last name Sakano. Ueno's family had wanted him to marry another woman but during the wedding he snuck out the back door.) more often referred as Yaeko Ueno, was an unmarried partner to Hidesaburō Ueno for about 10 years until his death in 1925. Hachikō was reported to have shown great happiness and affection toward her whenever she came to visit him. Yaeko died on April 30, 1961 at 75–76 years old, and despite her request to her family members to be buried with her late partner, she was buried at a temple in Taitō, further away from Ueno's grave. Her request was later found by Sho Shiozawa, the professor of the University of Tokyo in 2013, who was also the president of the Japanese Society of Irrigation, Drainage and Rural Engineering, which manages Ueno's grave at Aoyama Cemetery.

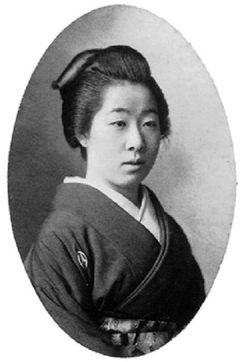
Yaeko Sakano

On November 10, 2013, which marked the 90th anniversary of the Birth of Hachikō, Sho Shiozawa and Keita Matsui, a curator of the Shibuya Folk and Literary Shirane Memorial Museum, felt the need for Yaeko be buried together with Ueno and Hachikō. Shiozawa also was one of the organizers involved with the creation of the bronze statue of Hachikō and Ueno which was unveiled on the grounds of the University of Tokyo on the 80th anniversary of Hachikō's death on March 9, 2015. Although having the consent of both the Ueno and Sakano families, the process took two years due to regulations and bureaucracy.

== Reunion of Hachikō's family ==
On 19 May 2016, during a ceremony at the Aoyama Cemetery attended by members of the Ueno and Sakano families, some of the ashes of Yaeko Sakano were buried with Ueno and Hachikō. Her name and the date of her death were inscribed on the side of Ueno's tombstone, thus reuniting Hachikō's family.

== See also ==
- Hachi: A Dog's Tale
- Hachikō Monogatari
