= Seijirō Kōyama =

Japanese film director (born 1941)

- Born: 16 July 1941 (age 85); Gifu Prefecture, Japan
- Occupation: film director

Seijirō Kōyama (神山征二郎, Kōyama Seijirō) (born 16 July 1941) is a Japanese film director.

== Career ==
Born in Gifu Prefecture, Kōyama attended Nihon University but quit midway to join the independent production company Kindai Eiga Kyokai, where he worked as an assistant director under such directors as Kaneto Shindō, Kōzaburō Yoshimura, and Tadashi Imai. He made his directorial debut in 1971 with the children's film Koi no iru mura. His third film, Futatsu no hāmonika (1976), earned him a New Directors Citation from the Directors Guild of Japan. His 1983 film Hometown was entered into the 13th Moscow International Film Festival. His 1987 film, Hachiko Monogatari, about the faithful dog Hachikō, was the top Japanese film at the box office that year. He is known for his humanistic perspective.

Kōyama was given the Chunichi Culture Award in 2000 for "producing films that scrutinize the age and the region."

== Filmography ==
- Koi no iru mura (鯉のいる村) (1971)
- The Clock Was Alive (時計は生きていた) (1973)
- Futatsu no hāmonika (二つのハーモニカ) (1976)
- Tomorrow Evening (あすも夕やけ) (1977)
- Nurse's Husband (看護婦のオヤジがんばる) (1980)
- Fifth Movement (日本フィルハーモニー物語 炎の第五楽章) (1981)
- Hometown (ふるさと) (1983)
- Song of the Spring Pony (春駒のうた) (1985)
- Tabiji mura de ichiban no kubitsurinoki (旅路 村でいちばんの首吊りの木) (1986)
- Hachiko Monogatari (ハチ公物語) (1987)
- Thousand Cranes (千羽づる) (1989)
- Isewan Taifuu Monogatari (伊勢湾台風物語) (1989)
- Don't Mind (ドンマイ) (1990)
- The Pale Hand (白い手) (1990)
- Tōki Rakujitsu (遠き落日) (1992)
- Summer of the Moonlight Sonata (月光の夏) (1993)
- Sakura (さくら) (1994)
- Himeyuri no To (ひめゆりの塔) (1995)
- Mitabi no kaikyô (三たびの海峡) (1995)
- The Life and Love of Kenji Miyazawa (宮澤賢治－その愛－) (1996)
- Maya no Isshou (マヤの一生) (1996)
- Riot in Gujo (郡上一揆) (2000)
- A Single Drop of Water in a Mighty River, aka Taiga no Itteki (大河の一滴) (2001)
- Kusa no Ran (草の乱) (2004)
- Hokushin naname ni sasu tokoro (北辰斜にさすところ) (2007)
- The Last Game: Waseda vs. Keio (ラストゲーム 最後の早慶戦) (2008)
- Tsuru Akira: Kokoro no kiseki (鶴彬 こころの軌跡) (2009)
- Gakkô o tsukurou (学校をつくろう) (2011)
- Until the Day Comes (救いたい) (2014)
- Toki no Kōro (時の行路) (2019)
- Shinpei (シンペイ 歌こそすべて) (2025)
