= Wag =

Wag generally refers to tail wagging by dogs.

Wag, Wags, WAG or WAGS may also refer to:

== Arts and entertainment ==
- Wag (band), a Japanese rock music group, active 1998–2006
- Wag, a character in Kabumpo in Oz (1922)
- Wags the Dog, a mascot in the Australian children's band The Wiggles
- WAGS (TV series), an American reality TV series
- Winnipeg Art Gallery, in Manitoba, Canada
- Women's Art Group, precursor to the Women's Art Movement in Adelaide, South Australia, 1974
- WAGS (AM), former Bishopville, South Carolina radio station

== Businesses based in the United States ==
- Wag (brand), a dog food brand by Amazon
- Wag (company), or Wag!, a pet care company
- Wag's, a defunct restaurant chain
- Wag-Aero, an aircraft manufacturer
- WAGS (AM), a defunct radio station
- Warner Animation Group, a corporate division of Warner Bros.

== Language ==
- WAGs, a British slang/journalese acronym for 'wives and girlfriends'
- Wild-Ass Guess, American slang for 'a rough estimate by an expert'
- Taupota language, an Oceanic dialect continuum (ISO 639-3 code: wag)
- Wagging, school truancy, in Commonwealth English slang

== People with the nickname ==
- Charles R. Harding (born c. 1866), English professional rower
- Charlie Keetley (1906–1979), English footballer
- Fred Waghorne ( "Old Wag"; 1865–1956), Canadian ice hockey referee
- Leon Wagner ("Daddy Wags"; 1934–2004), American baseball player
- WAG Pinto (1924–2021), Indian Army general

== Places ==
- Váh (Polish: Wag), a Slovak tributary of the Danube river
- Wag Islands, Nunavut, Canada
- Wag Province, Amhara Region, Ethiopia

== Sport ==
- WAGs, slang acronym for "wives and girlfriends" (of footballers and other sportsmen)
- West Asian Games, a defunct quadrennial event
- Women's artistic gymnastics, a sport
- World Air Games, an international air sports event

== Transportation ==
- Wangaratta railway station, Australia
- Wellsville, Addison and Galeton Railroad, Pennsylvania and New York (reporting mark: WAG)
- Whanganui Airport, New Zealand (IATA code: WAG)
- Wide AC goods, a classification of Indian locomotives

== See also ==
- WAG bag
