= Argos (dog) =

Odysseus's faithful dog in the Odyssey

Argos Ἄργος
- Ulysses and Argus (print by Frederick Stacpoole after a painting by Briton Rivière)
- Species: Dog
- Sex: Male
- Notable role: Hunting dog
- Known for: Waiting faithfully for Odysseus to return to Ithaca
- Owner: Odysseus
- Residence: Ithaca

In Homer's Odyssey, Argos (/ˈɑːrɡoʊs, -ɡəs/; Ancient Greek: Ἄργος), sometimes referred to as Argus, is Odysseus's faithful dog. Bred to be a hunting dog before Odysseus leaves for the Trojan War, Argos is neglected after Odysseus is presumed dead. Twenty years later, Odysseus returns to Ithaca and finds him lying in piles of manure, immobile from old age and neglect, and infested with parasites. When Argos sees Odysseus, he immediately recognizes him, dropping his ears and wagging his tail. Disguised as a beggar, Odysseus cannot greet his dog without revealing his identity, but secretly weeps. Upon seeing his master return home, Argos dies.

The Argos scene is among the most well-known episodes in the Odyssey and scholars of classical literature have commented on its structure, meaning, and literary value. Argos has been described as a symbol of faithfulness and a metaphor for the decline of Odysseus and his household (oikos) within the larger narrative of the poem. Argos's death is signaled using language typically reserved for the noble deaths of warriors, and a periphrastic construction is used to focalize the narrative as if told from his perspective.

== Name ==
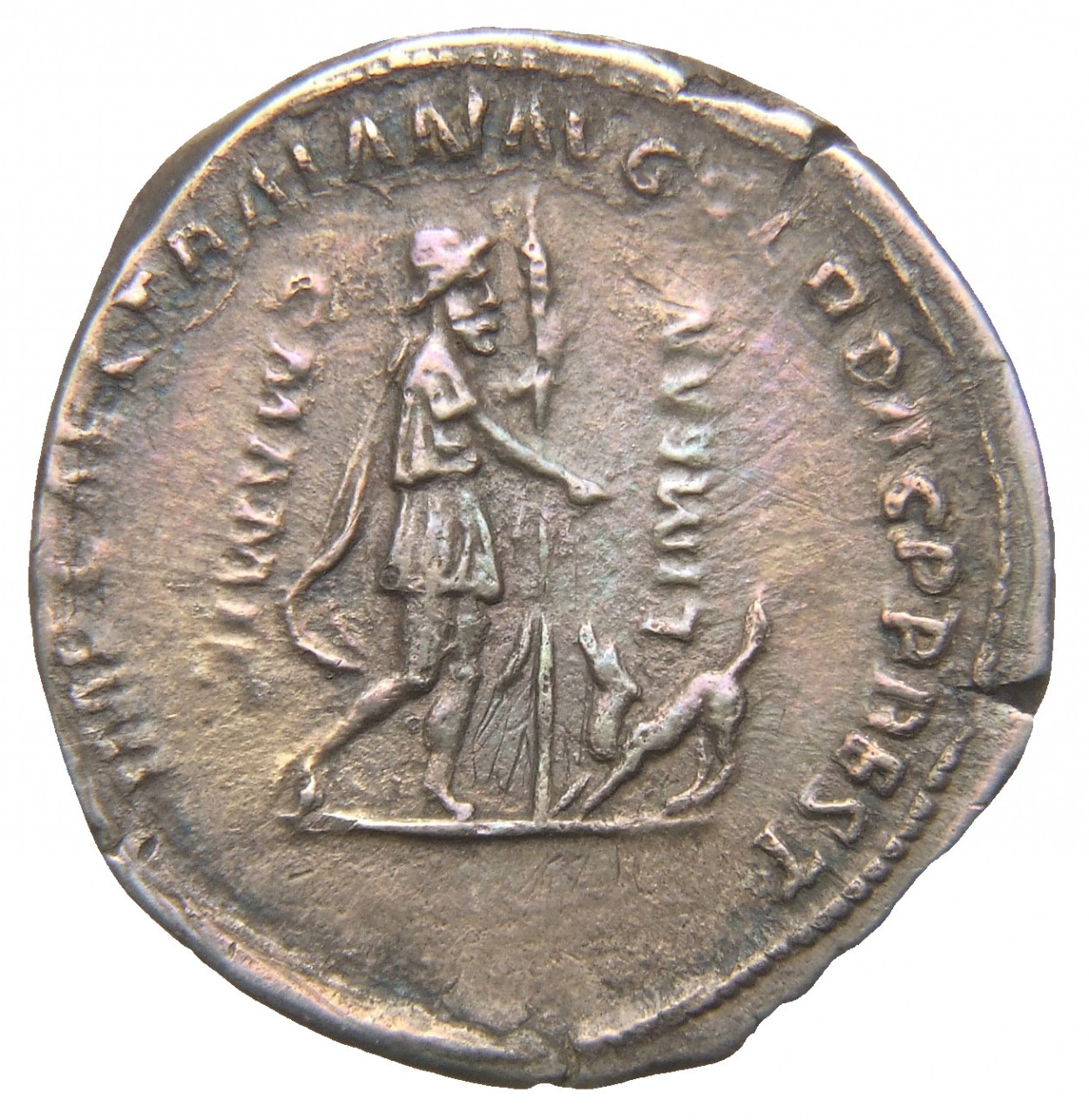
A Roman coin depicting Odysseus and Argos, 112–114 AD

The name Argos (Ancient Greek: Ἄργος) is derived from the Ancient Greek adjective ἀργός (argós), meaning literally 'shining white, brilliant', with a secondary metaphorical meaning of 'quick, agile'; this semantic change is found elsewhere in the Indo-European languages. In Homeric Greek, this appellation was commonly applied to quick dogs. The movement of the Ancient Greek accent from the final syllable to the preceding one is typical of proper nouns. Robert S. P. Beekes translates his name literally as 'the nimble one'.

The name is derived from the Proto-Indo-European word *h₂rǵ-ró-s – a zero-grade derivative of *h₂erǵ- ('white, glittering') – with the second *r being dropped through dissimilation. The name is cognate with Latin argentum ('silver') and Hittite 𒄯𒆠𒅖 (ḫar-ki-iš; 'white, bright'), among others. It is etymologically related to the Argo (Ἀργώ), the ship used by Jason and the Argonauts in the story of the Golden Fleece; the ship's name also refers to its swiftness. Argos is also the name of the hundred-eyed watchman in other Greek myths, Argos Panoptes (Ἄργος Πανόπτης; 'Argos the All-Seer'); one mythological tradition purports that Argos Panoptes was himself originally a watchdog.

== In the Odyssey ==
So Argos lay there dirty, covered with fleas. And when he realized Odysseus was near, he wagged his tail, and both his ears dropped back. He was too weak to move toward his master. At a distance, Odysseus had noticed, and he wiped his tears away [...]

ἔνθα κύων κεῖτ᾽ Ἄργος, ἐνίπλειος κυνοραιστέων.
δὴ τότε γ᾽, ὡς ἐνόησεν Ὀδυσσέα ἐγγὺς ἐόντα,
οὐρῇ μέν ῥ᾽ ὅ γ᾽ ἔσηνε καὶ οὔατα κάββαλεν ἄμφω,
ἆσσον δ᾽ οὐκέτ᾽ ἔπειτα δυνήσατο οἷο ἄνακτος
ἐλθέμεν: αὐτὰρ ὁ νόσφιν ἰδὼν ἀπομόρξατο δάκρυ [...]

— Odyssey 17 (lines 300–306), translated by Robert Fagles from the original Greek

In the Odyssey, Odysseus begins his return to Ithaca after ten years of fighting in the Trojan War. His attempts to reach his home last another ten years, during which his family and friends believe him to be dead and various suitors attempt to marry his wife Penelope. Upon his return, Odysseus is disguised as an elderly beggar by Athena and reveals his true identity to his son, Telemachus. Together, they agree that Penelope's suitors must be killed. Odysseus travels with his swineherd slave Eumaeus, to whom he has not revealed his identity, towards Odysseus's palace. As they are traveling, Argos awakes to the sound of Odysseus's voice. It is revealed that Odysseus had raised him as a hunting dog and, before Odysseus had left for the war, Argos was used to hunt deer, wild goats, and hares by other young men, but had never hunted with Odysseus. After Odysseus left for Troy, Argos was neglected and, as Odysseus walks by, is lying in deep piles of manure and riddled with ticks. (Note: The nature of Argos's infestation is not uniformly translated; the original Greek phrase ἐνίπλειος κυνοραιστέων (enípleios kunoraistéōn) has been variously translated as 'covered with ticks', 'covered in vermin', and 'full of fleas'.) Once Argos recognizes Odysseus, he drops his ears and begins to wag his tail, but his condition leaves him unable to get up and greet Odysseus; Odysseus begins to cry, wiping a tear from his eyes. He asks Eumaeus about the dog, commenting on his beautiful form, and wonders if he was once as great as his form suggests. Eumaeus replies that Argos belonged to Odysseus and was once a great hunting dog who caught everything he tracked. He recounts that after Odysseus had been presumed dead, no one took care of Argos, and Eumaeus curses the servants for their negligence. As the two men enter the palace, where the suitors are, Argos dies.

== Analysis ==
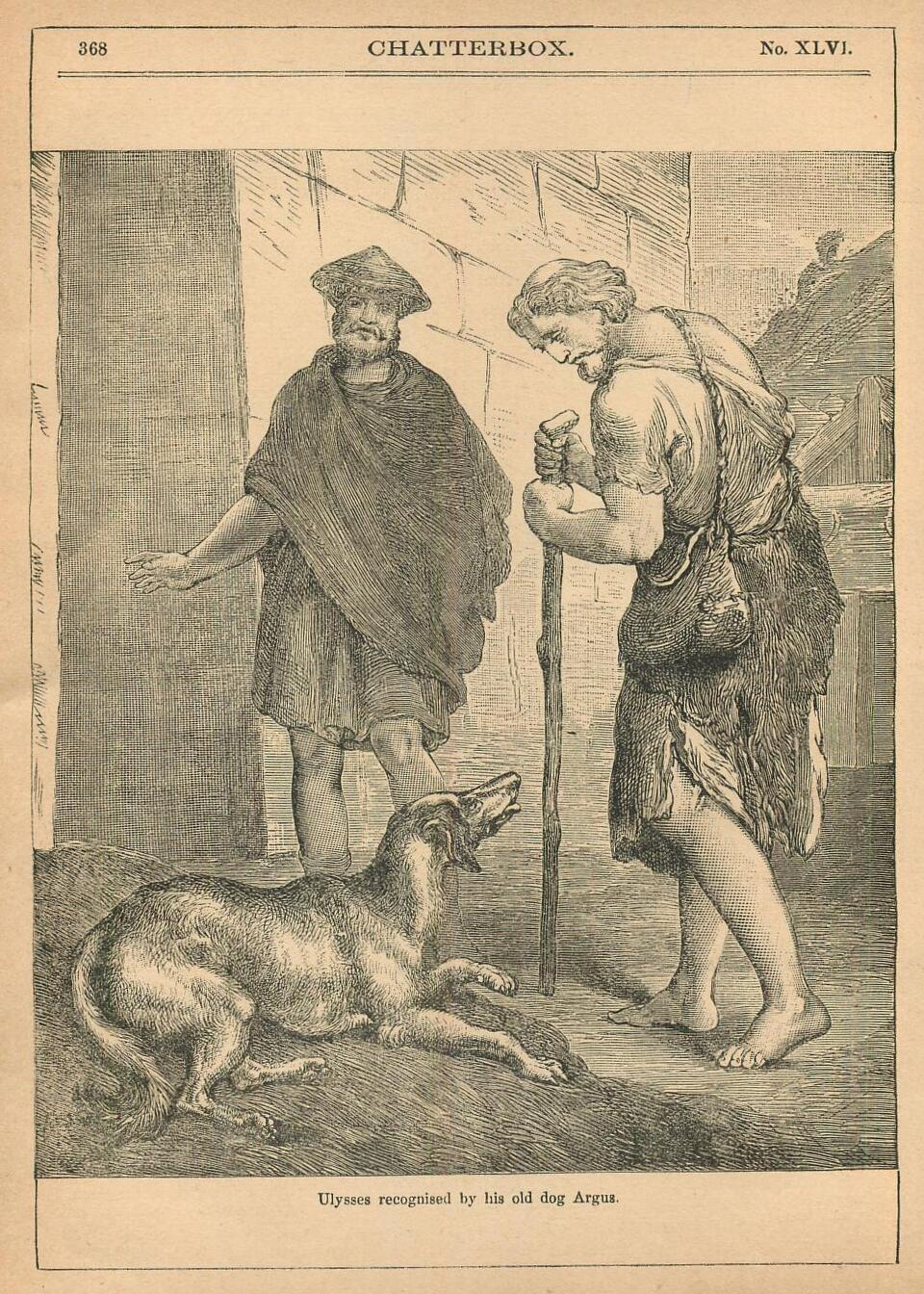
An illustration of the reunion scene in Chatterbox, 1886

The reunion scene between Odysseus and Argos is among the most famous episodes in the Odyssey and has been described as one of the most emotional scenes in Western literature. There are three major elements of the scene to which scholarly attention has largely been paid: its placement in relation to other events in the poem, its emotional gravity (pathos), and its employment as a metaphor for Odysseus and the state of his household (oikos).

=== Narrative function in the Odyssey ===
The Argos scene is placed in the middle of the seventeenth book of the poem and is a part of its larger visitation narrative, where Odysseus goes to meet his wife's suitors. Both the scene and the larger narrative are an inversion of the expected "hospitality ritual" (xenia). The appearance of Argos begins a series of anagnorises, and is the only anagnorisis in the Odyssey where two characters recognize each other immediately and simultaneously. Argos is the only member of Odysseus's household to recognize him without divine assistance or evidence provided by Odysseus himself. The revelation by the narrator of Argos's death uses the keynote phrase "in the twentieth year" (ἐεικοστῷ ἐνιαυτῷ, eeikostōi eniautōi), which is usually reserved for when Odysseus reveals himself to another character or to signal the consequences of his absence. The narrative language depersonalizes Odysseus as "his master" (anax), using this periphrastic construction in order to present the narrative as if composed from Argos's perspective. Some authors, such as Bernhard Frank and Maurice Bowra, have argued that the scene signals Odysseus's "true moment of homecoming" (nostos), since it displays both how long he has been gone and how loyalty and affection have remained.

An overarching purpose of the scene is to create "tension through retardation"; that is, the context in which the story takes place is given more narrative tension by delaying the moment which would relieve that tension for the audience. In this case, this narrative device stalls Odysseus from confronting his wife's suitors in his own home.

=== As a symbol of Odysseus and his oikos ===
Scholars have emphasized the analogous relationship between Argos and Odysseus, as well as between Argos and Odysseus's oikos. Argos is a major aspect of the "watchdog motif" found throughout the Odyssey, where watchdogs are used as symbols for something else; Argos represents the dilapidation of Odysseus's oikos. Elements of Argos's story echo, sometimes word for word, parts of the poem related to Odysseus's son Telemachus. The poem states that Odysseus raised Argos, but "got no joy of him" (οὐδ' ἀπόνητο, oud' apónēto) since he left for Troy shortly thereafter. The exact same phrase is used in the previous book to describe the relationship between Odysseus and Telemachus, leading the audience to examine the relationships in parallel.

Several authors have written that, in some ways, Argos represents Odysseus himself. Argos lies in piles of manure, which mirrors Odysseus's beggar disguise, and his body is infested with parasites, which mirrors how Odysseus views his wife's suitors as "vermin" infecting his oikos. Both Odysseus and Argos have their glorious pasts contrasted with their current poor conditions. In his response to Odysseus's inquiry about the dog, Eumaeus frames Argos as an analog for Odysseus himself; Argos's physical prowess and excellence in hunting are ascribed to Odysseus earlier in the poem and in the Iliad.

Bernd Steinbock has argued that the episode with Argos contains parallels to the scene between Odysseus and his father Laertes seven books later. Although still mobile, Laertes no longer travels into town and awaits only his son's return to Ithaca. Grief-ridden, he debases himself by wearing shoddy clothing and doing slave labor, mirroring the tick-ridden Argos. Laertes wears a goat-leather helmet (κυνέη [kunéē], which is derived from κύων [kúōn] 'dog') and suffers miserably like Argos in Odysseus's absence.

=== Pathos ===
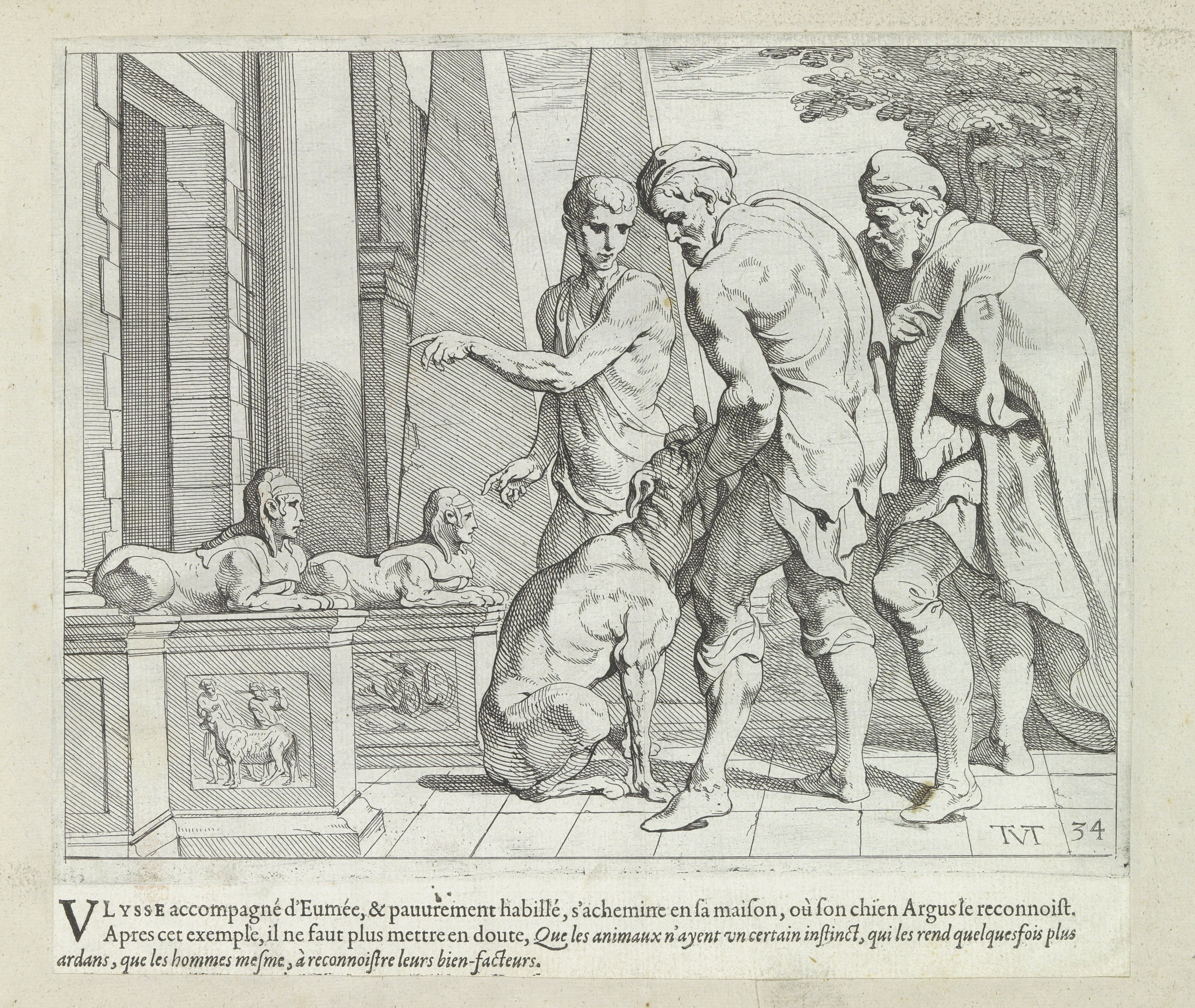
Odysseus door zijn hond Argus herkend ('Odysseus recognized by his dog, Argos'), Theodoor van Thulden (1633) (Note: The caption reads: 'Odysseus accompanied by Eumaeus, and dressed as a poor person, goes to his house, where his dog Argos recognizes him. Following this example, we must no longer doubt that animals have a certain instinct which makes them sometimes more eager than men themselves to recognize their good elements.')

Scholars have identified several literary devices which amplify the emotional impact (pathos) of Argos on the story. Odysseus's recognition of Argos's combined faithfulness and destitution leads to his emotional response; the inability of both to act on their emotions – Argos, unable to walk, and Odysseus, unable to acknowledge him – encourages the audience to sympathize with both. The language surrounding Argos treats him as a human character; he is given a name and an introduction.

Argos's friendly behavior also invites the audience to experience anxious concern for Odysseus; if Eumaeus notices Argos behaving friendly towards an ostensible stranger, it might raise his suspicions as to Odysseus's identity before he is ready to reveal it. Argos's inability to move towards Odysseus thus provides the audience with relief – as Argos is unable to unwittingly betray his master's disguise – and further emotional turmoil, since the reunion cannot be fully consummated. The narrative contrasts Argos's past as an unequaled hunting dog with his current powerlessness, mirroring Odysseus's condition prior to confronting his wife's suitors which creates an atmosphere of uncertainty around the possibility of Odysseus's chances of success against the suitors. Throughout the Odyssey, Odysseus holds back or hides his tears from those around him, but upon seeing Argos, he cries; although the tears are hidden from Eumaeus, they are not hidden from the audience.

=== Death ===
Twenty years had passed since Argos saw Odysseus, and now he saw him for the final time—then suddenly, black death took hold of him.

Ἄργον δ᾽ αὖ κατὰ μοῖρ᾽ ἔλαβεν μέλανος θανάτοιο,
αὐτίκ᾽ ἰδόντ᾽ Ὀδυσῆα ἐεικοστῷ ἐνιαυτῷ.

— Odyssey 17 (lines 326–327), translated by Robert Fagles from the original Greek

When Argos dies, the narrative of the poem uses language reserved for the noble deaths of warriors – the "solemn death formula" – which elevates Argos as a noble and heroic figure. Argos's death fulfills Odysseus's hopes for his own death, adumbrated in book seven: "And let life leave me when I have once more seen my property, my servants, and my great high-roofed house." The timing of his death – immediately after seeing Odysseus – demonstrates his unwavering fidelity to his master and serves to further the pathos of the scene and Argos's inclusion in the larger narrative. Bernhard Frank argues, using Argos's destitution as a representation of Odysseus's, that Argos's death symbolizes the end of Odysseus's decline. Odysseus's restraint demonstrates his resolve to complete his mission: "thereby released from his weak self-image and the dangers of sentimentality [...] he is now free to move on".

== Adaptations ==
In 2016, HarperCollins published Argos: The Story of Odysseus as Told by His Loyal Dog, a point-of-view retelling by Ralph Hardy whose prose is an homage to the literary traditions of Ancient Greek. In her Bulletin of the Center for Children's Books review, April Spisak found the book "odd but compelling" and the titular canine "memorable". However, she added that "much of the urgency, passion, strife, and drama of the original story is muted or lost altogether" through its focus on the animal characters. The staff of Kirkus offered similar views as regarded Argos himself, and found the story "disjointed". Reviewers recommended it as an accessible version of the myth for young readers, but criticized its lack of a glossary.

Argos appeared in the 2026 film adaptation of the Odyssey. Its director, Christopher Nolan, referred to the Odyssey as "the ultimate dog story", and cited Argos as one of the main motivations for creating the film.

== See also ==
- Man's best friend
- Greek mythology in popular culture
- Cultural depictions of dogs
- Human–canine bond
- List of fictional dogs
- List of individual dogs
- Hachikō
- Fido (Italian dog)
- Shep (American dog)
- Greyfriars Bobby
