= Petting =

Gentle physical interaction with an animal to comfort or show affection

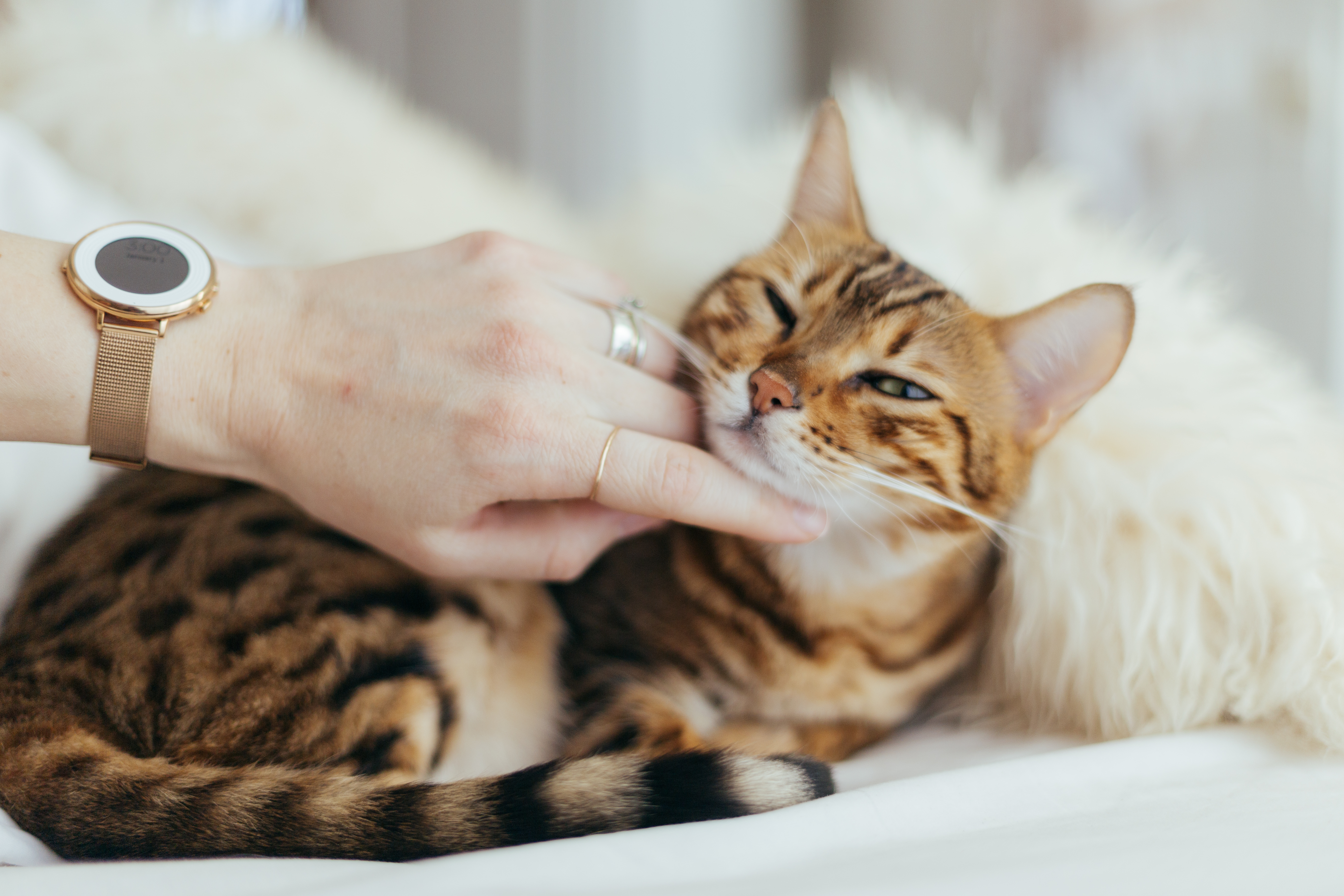
Cat receiving pets on the neck and chin

Petting is the act of gently stroking or touching animals, typically pets or other domesticated animals, as a form of affection, comfort, or communication. It is a common form of tactile interaction between humans and animals, often employed to strengthen the human-animal bond, and to promote relaxation for both humans and animals.

== Behavioral and communicative aspects ==
Animals often communicate using complex body postures and facial expressions, which may be misinterpreted by humans whose interactions with animals typically involve verbal and tactile methods like petting. Research has demonstrated that the response of animals to petting varies significantly, depending on factors including their familiarity with the person performing the action. Interactions involving petting by a familiar person tend to elicit fewer appeasement gestures from animals, suggesting a higher level of comfort compared to interactions with unfamiliar individuals.

Petting prior to brief separations from owners has also been shown to positively influence dog behavior, making them calmer during periods of separation. This is reflected in reduced heart rates and more extended displays of calm behavior during owner absence.

== Belly rubs ==
Cat enjoying a belly rub

A belly rub or tummy rub is the act of gently touching a pet's stomach area. Numerous dogs enjoy belly rubbing, but not all of them. When a dog rolls on their back, it may be an indication that the dog wants a belly rub; however, this is not always the case. A dog’s stomach is an immensely vulnerable part of their body. Some body language that indicates that a dog wants a belly rub includes vocalization, tail wagging, open (or squinty) eyes, relaxed and open mouth, while their body is wiggly and loose. If the dog kicks their leg or both legs during belly rub, it is completely normal, and the phenomenon itself is called a scratch reflex.

While some cats enjoy belly rubs, many do not. If a cat rolls onto its back, exposing its belly, it may be finding a comfortable position to sleep, or inviting another cat to play fight.

== Physiological and psychological effects on humans ==
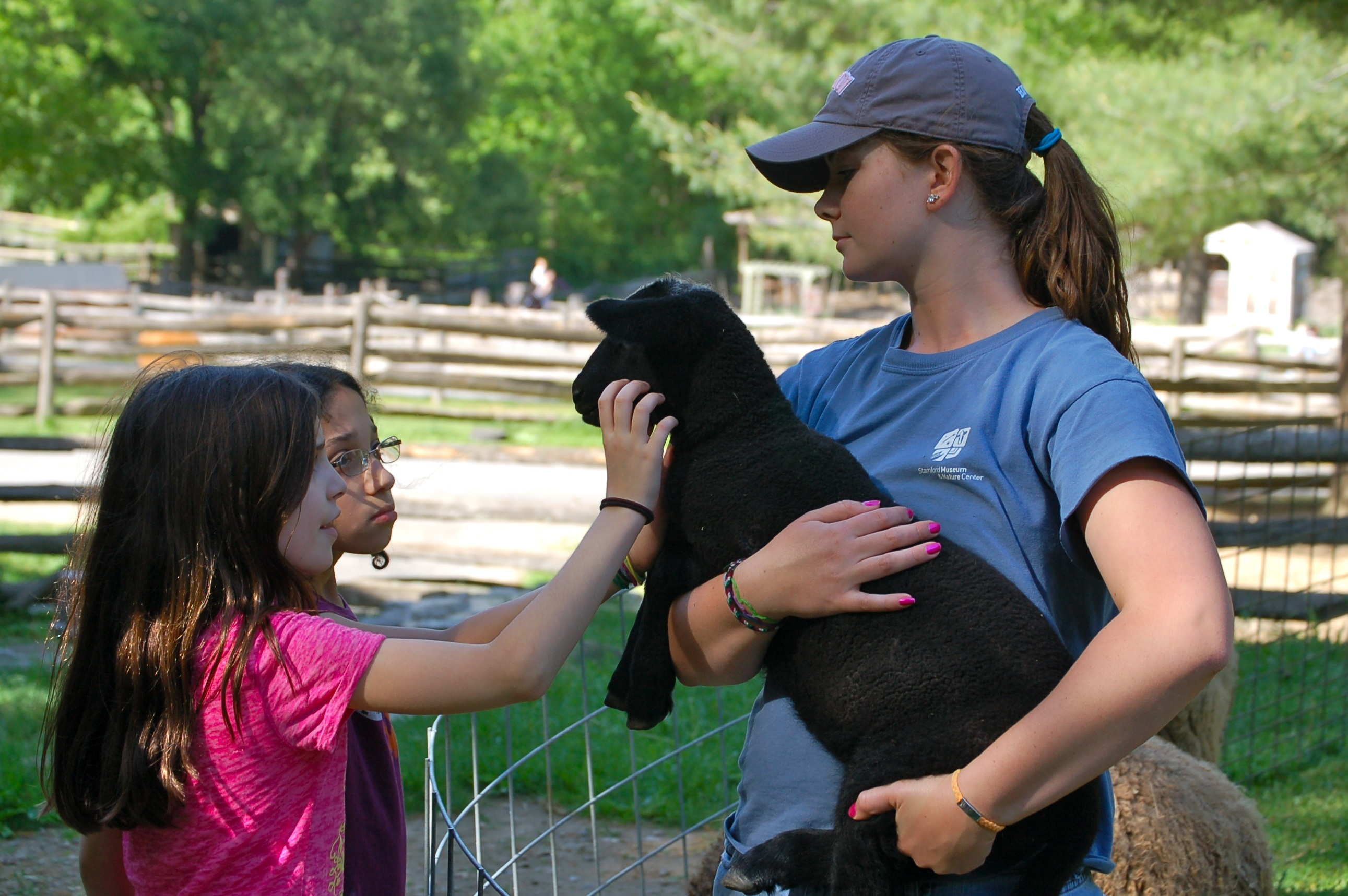
A pair of children petting a goat at the Stamford Museum & Nature Center

Petting of animals is associated with positive physiological effects for humans, including reductions in blood pressure and heart rate, indicative of relaxation and reduced stress. A study comparing the blood pressure and heart rates of pet owners while petting their dogs versus other activities found significant decreases in both measures during petting sessions. This indicates a relaxation response mediated through tactile interaction with animals. Research into the health benefits of interactions with companion animals has similarly identified a reduction in stress indicators such as lower blood pressure and heart rates, suggesting substantial relaxation benefits.

== Petting zoos ==
A petting zoo is a zoo where visitors are permitted to touch and pet the animals. They are common in fairs and other public events, and typically include small ruminants such as sheep and goats, but can also include more exotic animals. Such zoos have often been a cause for public health concern due to zoonotic disease transmission.

== See also ==
- Emotion in animals
- Dog behavior
