= Wag the Dog (disambiguation) =

Wag the Dog is a 1997 American political satire black comedy film.

Wag the Dog may also refer to:

- Wag the Dog (novel), by Larry Beinhart, 1993, on which the film is based
- Wag the Dog (soundtrack), by Mark Knopfler, 1998, a soundtrack for the film
- Wag the dog, a political term for a situation in which a seemingly less important entity controls a more important one

== See also ==
- Tail wagging by dogs
- Wag (disambiguation)
- Wags the Dog, a mascot with the Australian children's band The Wiggles
