= Dog walking (disambiguation) =

Dog walking is the act of exercising a dog.

Dog walking, Dog Walk, Walking the dog, Walk the dog, and other variants may also refer to:

- Dog Walk, Illinois, an unincorporated community
- Dog Walk, Kentucky, an unincorporated community
- The Dogwalker (1999 film), a movie directed by Paul Duran
- The Dogwalker (2001 film), a movie directed by Jacques Thelemaque
- "Dogwalker" (story), a 1990 short story by Orson Scott Card
- "Walking the Dog", a song originally by Rufus Thomas and covered by many artists, including The Rolling Stones
- Walking the Dog (album), an album by Rufus Thomas
- "Walkin' the Dog", a song written by Shelton Brooks in 1916
- Walking the Dog (Gershwin), a musical piece by George Gershwin
- "Walking the Dog" (Devious Maids), a 2013 television episode
- "Walking The Dog", song on the 2009 album Aim and Ignite by Fun.
- "Walk The Dog," B-side to the 1981 single O Superman by Laurie Anderson
- "Walk the dog", a common yo-yo trick
- "Walk the dog", a basic freestyle skateboarding trick
- Walkin' the Dog, a novel by Walter Mosley

== See also ==
- Wag the Dog (disambiguation)
