= Fido =

Fido may refer to:

== Dogs ==
- Fido (Italian dog), a famous dog and symbol of loyalty
- Fido (Abraham Lincoln's dog), favorite dog of Abraham Lincoln

== Art and entertainment ==
=== Fictional characters ===
- Fido Dido, a male (human) youth cartoon character created in 1985, and
  - Fido Dido, associated with the soft drink 7 Up since 1988
- Fidough, a Pokémon species
- Fido, a pet Brontosaurus in the 1939 animated film Daffy Duck and the Dinosaur
- Fido, the pet dog sidekick in the 1916 animated film Bobby Bumps
- Fido, a dog voiced by Mel Blanc in the 1949 animated film Woody Woodpecker and His Talent Show
- Fido, a dog in the 1949 animated short film The House of Tomorrow
- Fido, a pet flea in the 1999 animated film Olive, the Other Reindeer
- Fido, a nickname for Claude Speed from the Grand Theft Auto video game series.

=== Film and television ===
- Fido (film), a Canadian comedy about a zombie named "Fido"
- FidoTV, an American television channel devoted to dogs
- Fido Awards, a Nickelodeon awards program hosted by Fred Willard in 2008

=== Music ===
- Fido (band), a punk/rock band from Melbourne, Australia
- Fido, one half of the reggaeton duo Alexis & Fido
- Fido, talking dog from the Frank Zappa song "Stinkfoot" on his 1973 album Over-Nite Sensation

=== Other art ===
- Fairfield Industrial Dog Object, a sculpture in Fairfield, Victoria, Australia

== People ==
- Beata Fido (born 1967), Polish actress
- Roger Grosjean (1920–1975), MI5 double agent (codename Fido) in World War II

== Technology ==
- FIDO Alliance, an industry consortium working on internet authentication mechanisms
- Fido (wireless carrier), a Canadian cellular, home phone and Internet provider
- FidoNet, a worldwide bulletin board system computer network, related to the FIDO bulletin board software package
- Fido, a microcontroller version of the Freescale ColdFire (part of the Motorola 68000 series)
- .fido a type of Cineon Graphics Data file format

=== Military and space ===
- Fido explosives detector, a portable "artificial nose" explosives detection device
- Fog Investigation and Dispersal Operation, a fog dispersal system developed in the Second World War
- Mark 24 Mine or FIDO, a U.S. acoustic homing torpedo used during World War II
