= Fido (Italian dog) =

Italian dog (1941–1958)

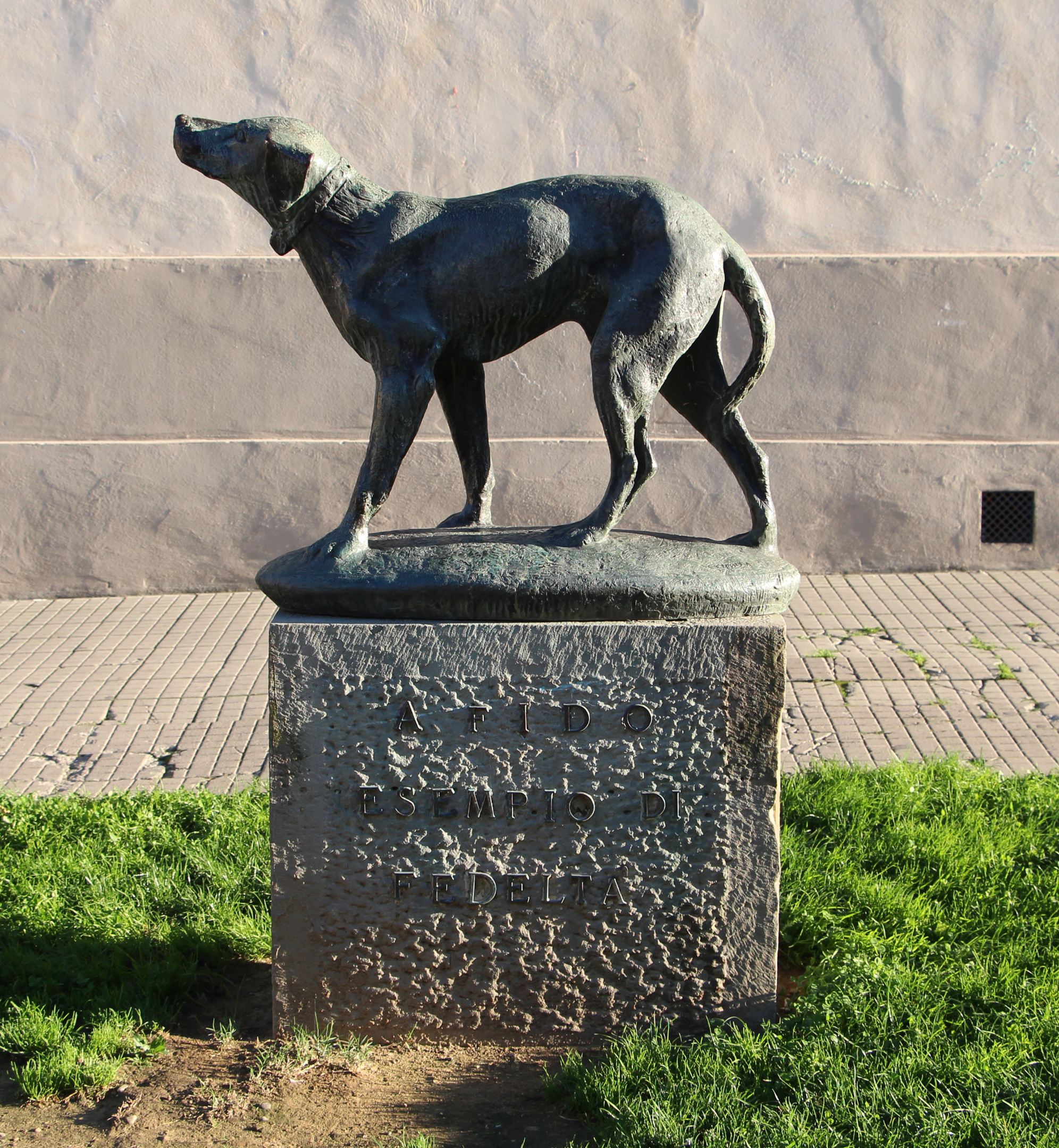
- Piazza Dante, Borgo San Lorenzo monument to Fido
- Species: Dog (Canis familiaris)
- Breed: Crossbreed dog, half-Pointer
- Sex: Male
- Born: Autumn of 1941; Borgo San Lorenzo, Italy
- Died: June 9, 1958 (aged 16); Borgo San Lorenzo, Italy
- Nationality: Italian
- Known for: Waiting fourteen years for the return of his deceased owner
- Owners: Carlo Soriani (until December 30, 1943), Carlo Soriani's widow (until Fido's death)
- Appearance: White with many dark piebald markings, short-haired, drop-eared, scenthound-like mix
- Named after: Ancient Latin dog name meaning "faithful"
- Awards: Gold medal from Mayor; Made legally unlicensed; "Monument to the dog Fido" Piazza Dante, Borgo San Lorenzo

Fido (1941 – June 9, 1958) was an Italian dog that came to public attention in 1943 because of his demonstration of unwavering loyalty to his dead master. Fido was the subject of articles appearing in many Italian and international magazines and newspapers, was featured in newsreels throughout Italy, and was bestowed several honors, including a public statue erected in his honor.

== Life ==
Fido probably began life sometime in the autumn of 1941 as an independent street dog in Luco di Mugello, a small town in the municipality of Borgo San Lorenzo, in the Tuscan Province of Florence, Italy. One night in November 1941, a brick kiln worker in Borgo San Lorenzo named Carlo Soriani, on his way home from the bus stop, found the dog lying injured in a roadside ditch. Not knowing whom the dog belonged to, Soriani took him home and nursed him back to health. Soriani and his wife decided to adopt the dog, naming him Fido ("faithful", from Latin fidus).

After Fido recovered, he followed Soriani to the bus stop in the central square of Luco di Mugello and watched him board the bus for his job. When the bus returned in the evening, Fido greeted Soriani and followed him home. This pattern repeated every workday for two years.

=== Vigil ===
On December 30, 1943, Borgo San Lorenzo was bombed by the Allies during the Second World War, and Soriani was killed. That evening, Fido showed up as usual at the bus stop, but did not see Soriani disembark. Fido later returned home, but for fourteen years thereafter (more than 5,000 times), until the day of his death, he went daily to the stop, waiting for Soriani to get off the bus.

Public interest in Fido grew during his life. Italian magazines Gente and Grand Hotel published the story of the dog, which also appeared in several newsreels of the Istituto Luce. Many readers were struck by the extraordinary faithfulness of Fido, including the mayor of Borgo San Lorenzo, who, on November 9, 1957, awarded him a gold medal in the presence of many citizens including Soriani's moved widow. Time magazine wrote an article about Fido in April 1957.

== Death and legacy ==
Fido died still waiting for his master on 9 June 1958. The news of his death was announced to the public by the newspaper on a four-column front-page story in La Nazione. On 22 June, La Domenica del Corriere commemorated Fido with a poignant cover story. The cover painting by Walter Molino shows Fido dying on the roadside, with the bus waiting in the background. Fido was buried outside the cemetery of Luco di Mugello beside his master, Carlo Soriani.

At the end of 1957, when Fido was still alive, the Comune of Borgo San Lorenzo commissioned the sculptor Salvatore Cipolla to create a monument of the dog as a testimony of that exemplary story of love and fidelity. The work, entitled "Monument to the dog Fido", was placed in Piazza Dante in Borgo San Lorenzo, next to the municipal palace. Under the statue depicting the dog is the dedication: A FIDO, ESEMPIO DI FEDELTÀ (TO FIDO, EXAMPLE OF LOYALTY). The monument was inaugurated by the mayor of Borgo San Lorenzo, in the presence of Fido and Soriani's widow. Originally, the statue was realized in majolica, but a few months after the inauguration some vandals destroyed it. Consequently, the mayor of Borgo San Lorenzo commissioned to Salvatore Cipolla a new statue, this time in bronze, which replaced the first one and that is still today in Piazza Dante.

== Similar stories ==
Fido is not the only dog to have become famous for public acts of extreme dedication to an individual person. Other dogs with very similar stories have captured the collective imagination, including the Japanese dog Hachikō, the American Shep, the Indian Waghya and the Scottish Greyfriars Bobby, and the fictional Ancient Greek Argos.

== See also ==
- Fido (disambiguation)
- List of individual dogs
