= Fido (band) =

- Origin: Melbourne, Victoria, Australia
- Genres: Rock, pop rock
- Years active: 1999–2010
- Labels: independent
- Members: Alex DesForges; Pete Seamons; Daniel Kelaart; Jesse Chatelier
- Past members: Caleb Brown; Haden Finger; Dan Coronado; Paul Derham; Scot Leslie; Dave Temby
- Website: Fido Myspace

Fido was an Australian rock band from Victoria, Australia, although they list themselves as Heavy Pop on their Myspace page. Fido formed in 1999 and have toured around Australia. The first recording took place through one microphone in the middle of Pete's parents lounge room. They would then go onto record their debut EP 'Open 7 Days' with Dave Carr of Rangemaster studios. Following recordings took place with 'Shooter McGavin' in The Basin, where the single "Lost Without You" was created. Fido's one and only album Something You Should Have was recorded with Daniel Kelaart at Clique studios in 2008.

Fido were known for their high energy on-stage performances, and have shared the stage with artists such as The Getaway plan, Antiskeptic, Kiss Chasy, Seraphs Coal and Wishful Thinking.

The song "Lift Me Up" (which first appeared on the EP Open Seven Days) had high rotation on the international youth radio show The Reality Zone.

The band have had video clips air on Channel V, Rage and Video Hits, along with national radio airplay for a cover they did of Delta Goodrem's "Lost Without You".

On 10 August, Fido announced with "much love" that they were "no more".

The final line up of Fido was David Temby, Jesse Chatelier, Alex DesForges and Daniel Kelaart.

Daniel Kelaart was in the top hundred of Australian Idol in 2006.

== Members ==
=== Members ===
- Alex DesForges - Drums/vocals
- Pete Seamons - Guitar/vocals/screamos
- Jesse Chatelier - Bass/vocals
- Daniel Kelaart.- Guitar/vocals

=== Other members ===
- Caleb (Mad Dog) Brown - Guitar/vocals
- Dan Coronado - Guitar/vocals
- Paul Derham - Guitar/Back-Up Vocals
- Scot Leslie - Bass guitar/Back-Up Vocals
- David Temby - Guitar

== Discography ==
- 15 Million Times - EP (2000)
- Open Seven Days - EP (2002)
- "Lost Without You" - single (2004)
- Something You Should Have - Album (2008)
