= WAGS (AM) =

DWAGS
Bishopville, South Carolina; United States
- Frequency: 1380 kHz

Programming
- Format: Defunct

Ownership
- Owner: Beaver Communications

History
- First air date: February 24, 1954
- Last air date: February 28, 2018
- Former call signs: WAGS (1954–2019)

Technical information
- Facility ID: 9105
- Class: D
- Power: 1,000 watts day
- Transmitter coordinates: 34°12′35″N 80°13′34″W

WAGS (1380 AM) was a radio station in Bishopville, South Carolina. Prior to shutting down, the station aired a country music format. WAGS was owned by Beaver Communications.

On March 1, 2018, WAGS went off the air, with the intent of turning in the station's license to the FCC, barring a purchase offer. The station's license was surrendered on March 7, 2019, and cancelled by FCC on March 12, 2019.

== See also ==
- WLLH Boston area station which went on the air in 1926 as WAGS
