= Shep (American dog) =

Border Collie who lived in Fort Benton, Montana

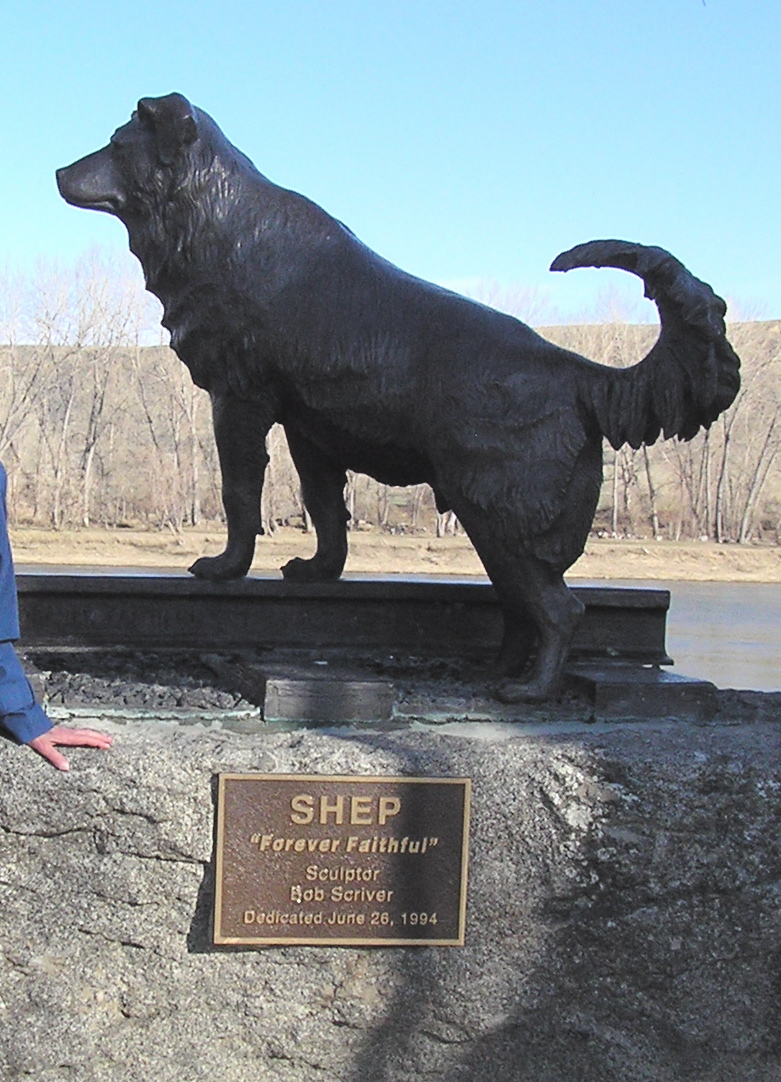
- Bronze sculpture of Shep on the bank of the Missouri River, Fort Benton, Montana.
- Species: Canis lupus familiaris
- Breed: Border Collie
- Sex: Male
- Died: January 12, 1942; Great Northern Railway station, Fort Benton, Montana
- Resting place: Cemetery Road, Fort Benton, Montana
- Nationality: United States
- Occupation: Former herding dog
- Years active: 1936–1942
- Known for: Waiting at the Great Northern Railway station
- Title: Forever Faithful
- Appearance: White with a black "cape"

Shep was a Border Collie and former herding dog that appeared at the Great Northern Railway station in 1936 in Fort Benton, Montana, and watched as his master's casket was loaded onto the train and left. The dog remained at the station, waiting for his owner to return for the next five and a half years, until he eventually became deaf and was killed by an oncoming train he could not hear in 1942.

== Life and death ==
Shep belonged to a sheep herder near Fort Benton, Montana. When his owner became ill in August 1936, he went into St. Clare Hospital at Fort Benton for treatment, and brought Shep with him. A few days later, he died. The dog followed his casket to the railroad station and watched while it was being loaded on a train heading to the eastern United States. He would greet every train that arrived each day after that. It took station employees time to realize that the body in the casket was Shep's owner, and he was showing up for each train to see if his owner would be getting off.

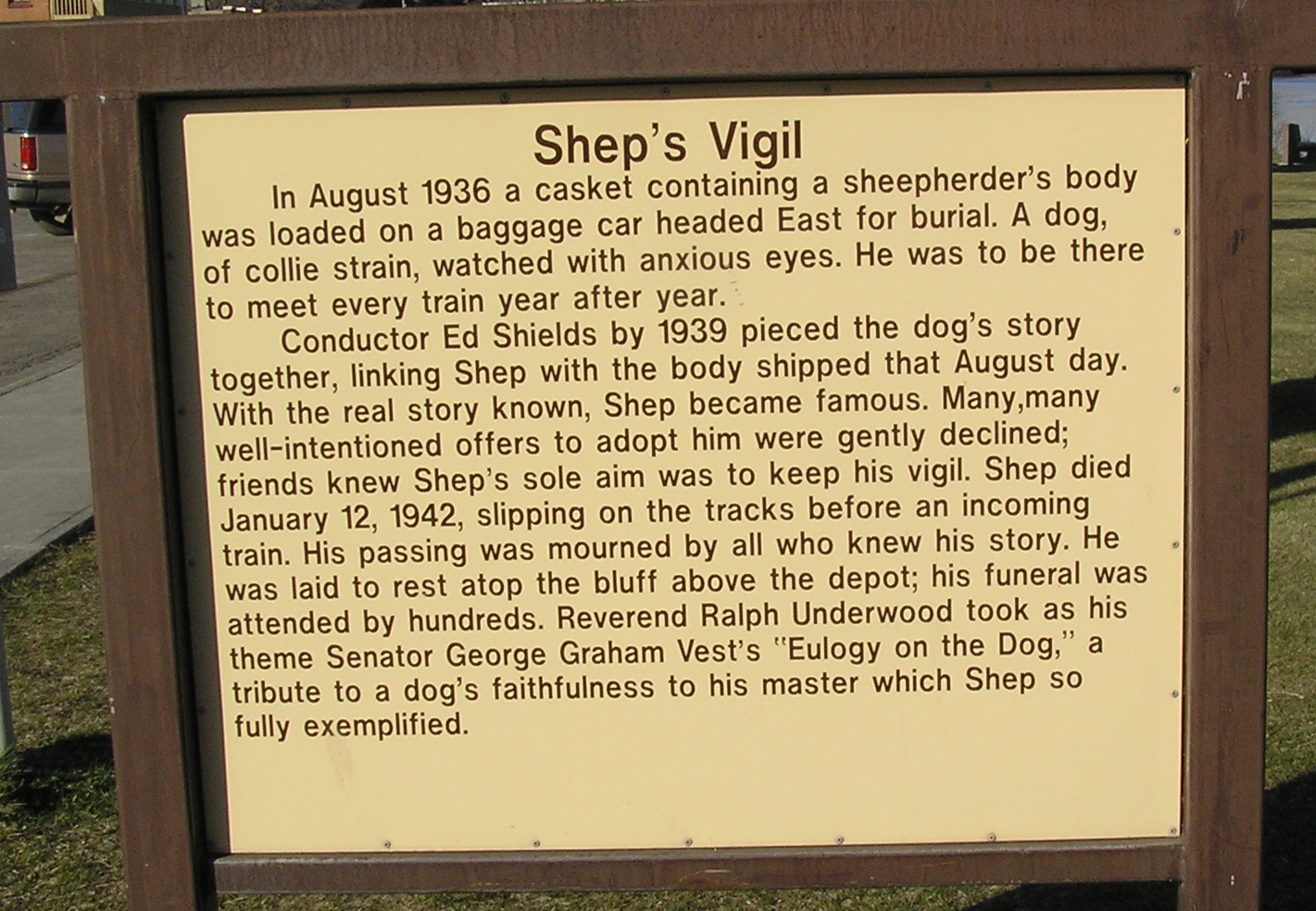
Historical marker telling the tale of Shep, Fort Benton, Montana

The station employees took care of him and he lived in and around the station, becoming well known to everyone who passed through. A few years into his time at the station, Shep and his story were featured in Ripley's Believe It or Not!. Shep waited for five and a half years until he was hit by a train on January 12, 1942. It is believed that his front paws were on one of the rails and he didn't hear the train until it was too late, and he slipped off the rail; the train's engineer could not stop the train in time.

=== Legacy ===
Shep's funeral was attended by nearly everyone in Fort Benton. Eulogy on the Dog was read at the funeral. Boy Scout Troop 47, who were the pallbearers and honor guard for Shep, helped carry his coffin to the dog's grave on a hillside overlooking the town. The Great Northern Railroad put up a simple obelisk, with a painted wooden cutout of Shep next to it. Just beneath, white stones spelled out SHEP. Lights illuminated the display at night. The passenger line eventually stopped coming through Fort Benton, and the grave fell into disrepair. In 1988, the grave was repaired.

The Shep cutout is now painted steel, and the lights are back up. The grave is currently maintained by the Kiwanis Key Club and Fort Benton Community Improvement Society, and a small parking area and a walking trail have been added behind the monument for easier access to the grave. Shep's collar and bowl are on display at the Museum of the Upper Missouri, Fort Benton, Montana. Shep's story is retold as historical fiction in Shep: Forever Faithful (2005) by Stewart H. Beveridge and Lee Nelson. The folk song "Ol Shep", sung by Ramblin' Jack Elliott, is related but tells a different story. A bronze sculpture of Shep, with his front paws on a rail, was unveiled in Fort Benton in 1994. The sculpture was made by Bob Scriver as stated on the sign of the sculpture.

== Gallery ==
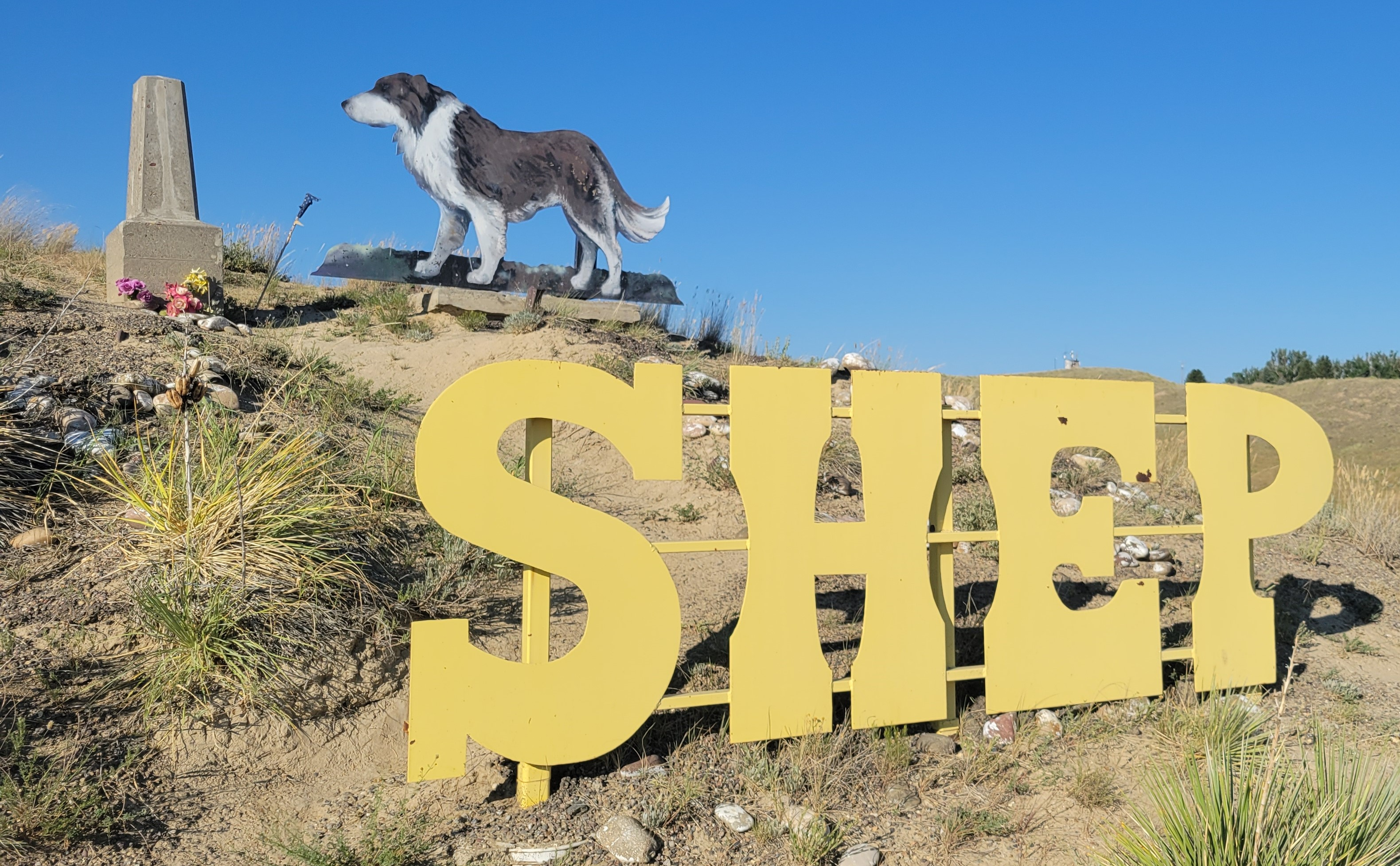
Shep's gravesite and marker.

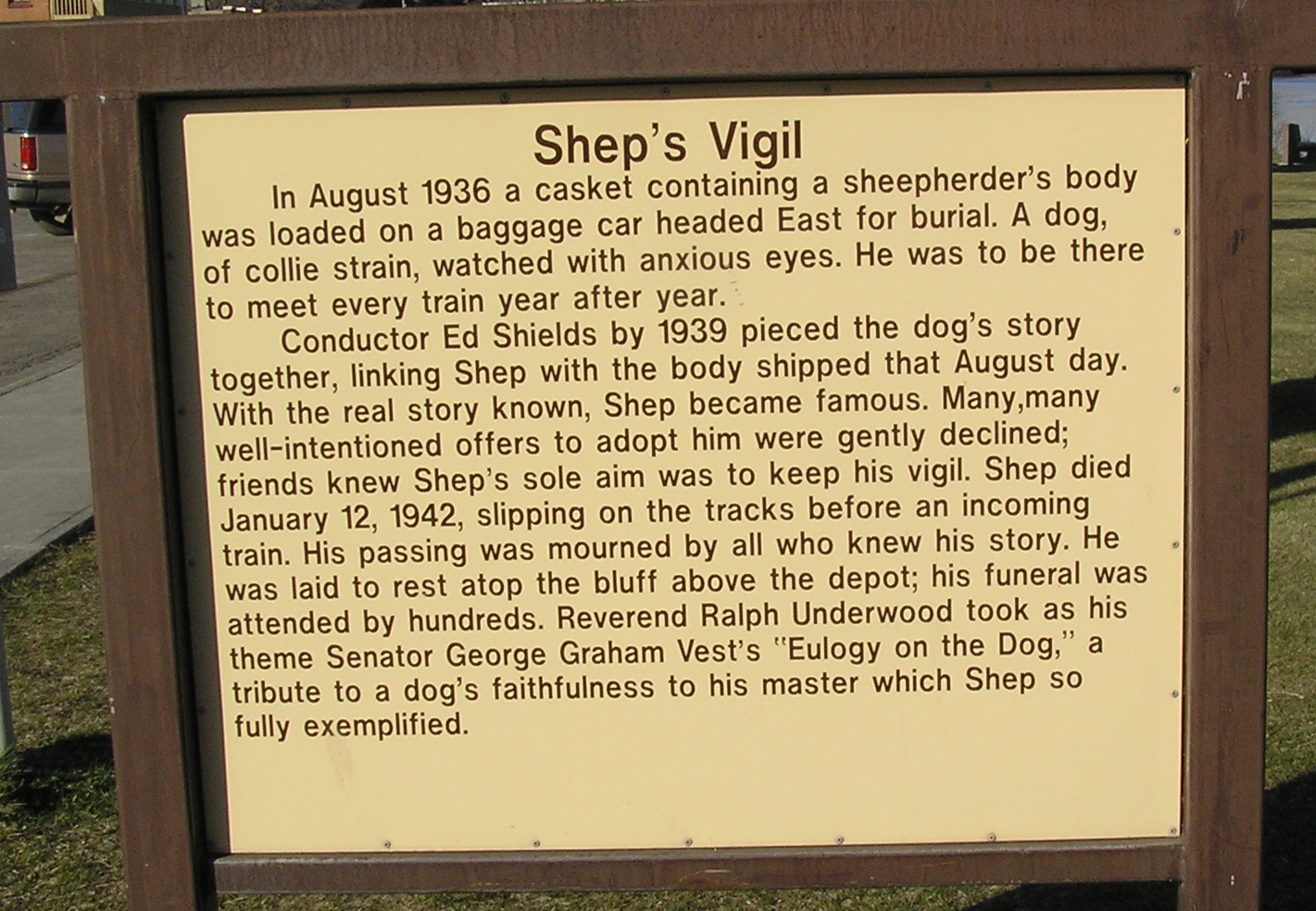
Historical marker telling the tale of Shep, Fort Benton, Montana

== See also ==
- List of dogs noted for being faithful after their master's death
- List of individual dogs
- Hachikō
- Fido (Italian dog)
- Greyfriars Bobby
- Loyalty (monument)
