= Body language of dogs =

Communication whereby dogs express emotions and intentions through bodily movements

The body language of dogs is one form of non-verbal communication whereby dogs can express emotions and intentions through bodily movements. It refers to the interpretation of posture and behaviour of species in the genus Canis. This form of visual communication is generally used for identifying emotions and intentions of domestic dogs, though it can also be applied to wild canines such as wolves. Understanding the body language of dogs is particularly important in preventing dog bites, especially of children. This communication can occur between dogs, or during a dog-human interaction. Such movements primarily involve the tail, the ears, and the head/body. Tail-wagging is a common tail movement used by dogs to communicate. Additionally, ear flattening or heightening are typical movements made using the ears. In terms of the head/body, it is of interest to study turning of the head, as well as the overall posture of the dog.

Because dogs communicate differently from humans, it is more difficult for humans to interpret their emotional states. By focusing on the combinations of motions made by dogs, and studying the aftermath of such sequences, humans are able to attribute different emotional states (i.e., contentment, fear, or aggression) as a result of the dog's body language.

By properly interpreting the body language of dogs, not only are humans able to decipher what a dog is trying to communicate, but are also able to recognize warning signs prior to an attack, decreasing the number of dog bite occurrences.

The body language under investigation can be divided into three different forms of cues: behavioural, holistic, and other. While behavioural cues focus primarily on studying movements without considering the underlying reasoning behind such movements, holistic cues are ones that occur as a result of either expressing emotions, or communicating intentions.

Understanding the body language of dogs can also aid in optimal obedience training, as observation of body language may reveal when the dog is most motivated and therefore provides a time-frame whereby dogs will learn more readily.

== Consequences of ignoring body language of dogs ==
In general, accurately assessing the body language of dogs is quite beneficial as it allows humans to react appropriately to emotions and intentions of the dog. Thus, it fosters successful companionship between the dog owner and pet. Alternatively, ignoring the body language of dogs can pose as a threat for not only humans, but for dogs too.

Properly assessing body language can predict whether or not the dog will bite. Biting occurrences most often involve small children, where bites often affect facial areas. In comparison, bites in adults are less serious, usually involving extremities. Warning signals can be identified through evaluating the body language of dogs accordingly. Oftentimes, people struggle when identifying the body motions of a fearful/anxious dog, incorrectly associating the motions with behaviours of approachable/relaxed dogs. This misinterpretation is most often one that results in the occurrence of biting.

Misreading the warning signs portrayed by dogs can also result in behavioural problems. Euthanasia can be avoided in cases where such behavioural issues occur due to humans ignoring the warning signs expressed by a dog.

== Head ==
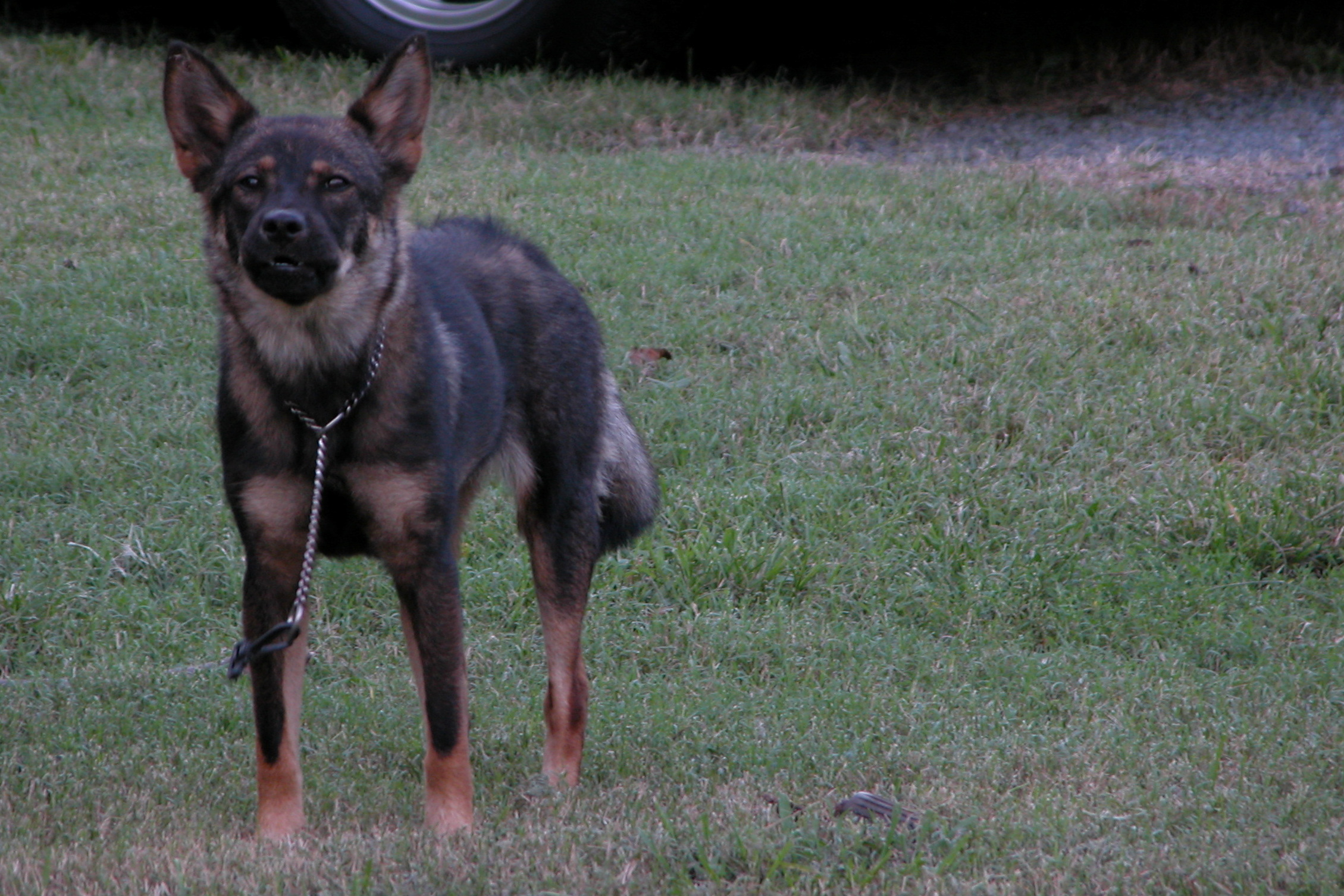
Dog displaying aggressive body language; note upright head position, staring, clenched teeth, and upright ears pointing forward

The position and movement, or lack thereof, of a dog's head can indicate a variety of emotional states. If the head is stationary, the main identifying difference is whether the head is upright or lowered. An upright head signifies attentiveness, dominance, or aggression, while a lowered head signifies fear or submission. A moving head may indicate that a dog is feeling playful.

A dog communicates by altering the position of its head. When the head is held in an erect position this could indicate that is approachable, attentive, curious, or aggressive. Turning the head away may indicate fear, but is also recognized as a calming signal. A dominant dog will display an upright posture and/or stiff legs. The head can be held in a high position convey being approachable, alert, aggressive, or displaying dominance.

=== Tilted head ===
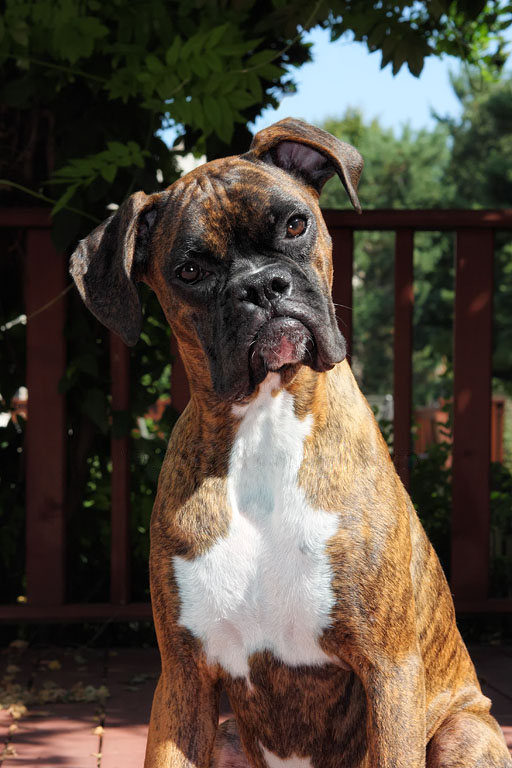
Female brindle Boxer tilting head

Another common position is a tilted head. While the reason for this head positioning has not been determined, it has been suggested that this behaviour shows that a dog is trying to listen more effectively or is anticipating a reward.

== Eyes ==
A dog's use of eye contact and eye movements can communicate emotions and intentions. Prolonged eye contact or staring are indicators of aggression, especially when combined with body stiffness. Avoiding eye contact, or looking down, is a submissive dog behaviour.

== Mouth ==
Senior Australian Shepherd with a relaxed facial expression, showing visible teeth, commonly interpreted as smiling

Dogs can express a range of emotions based on movements of the teeth and lips. In an aggressive dog, the lips curl back to expose clenched teeth, which warns others of their ferocity. Conversely, an open mouth showing unclenched teeth indicates that a dog is in a playful or relaxed mood.

== Ears ==
The ears of a dog can express a variety of emotions based on their position or the direction they are facing. Ear positions are similar to head positions with respect to the feelings they display. Ears that are upright and facing forward indicate dominance or aggression, while ears that are pulled back and facing downward indicate fear or submission. Unfortunately, not all dogs are able to communicate with their ears. Breeds with drooping ears, cropped ears, or ears that are permanently erect are mostly or completely unable to use their ears to display emotions.

== Tail ==
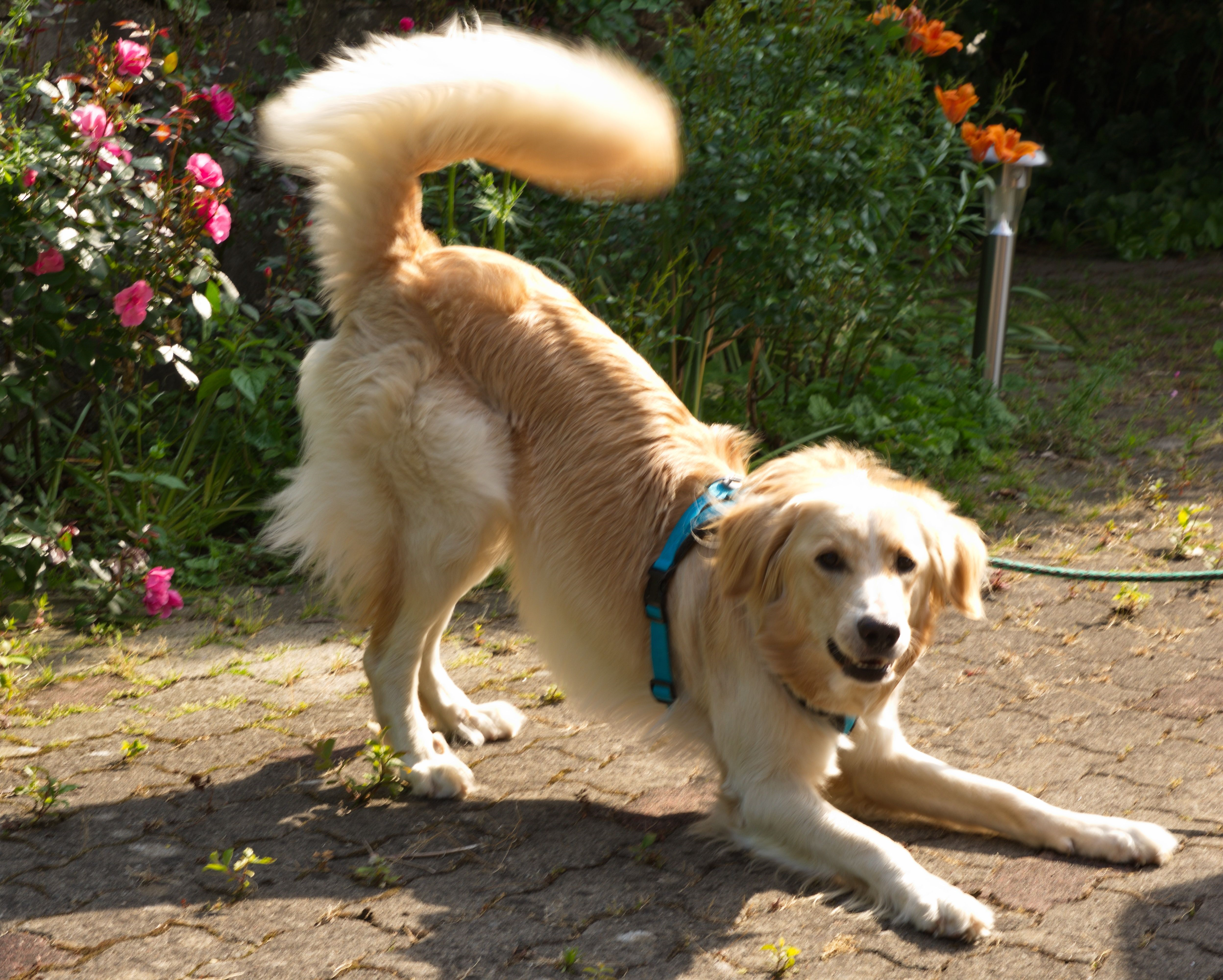
Dog displaying playful body language; note open mouth showing unclenched teeth, wagging tail, and play bow posture

The position and movement of a dog's tail are another effective indicator of emotions and intentions. Tail wagging is one of the most common dog behaviours that is used to convey emotion, but its meaning can vary significantly depending on the direction, speed, and context. If a dog's tail is held high while it wags, this is indicative of dominance, however if the high tail moves in a stiff wagging motion, this is indicative of aggression. The tail being positioned low between the hind legs, usually stationary, is an indication of fear or submission. If a dog's tail is wagging freely and vigorously, this displays a friendly or playful mood. Similar to ear position, tail positions and movements may be mostly or completely ineffective in dog breeds with short, tightly curled, or docked tails.

The tail of a dog can communicate a number of emotions and intentions. Tail wagging by dogs is familiar to those who interact with them. When a dog wags its tail, most people interpret this as the dog expressing happiness and friendliness. Though indeed tail wagging can express these positive emotions, it can also be an indication of fear, insecurity, the challenging of dominance, or a warning sign that the dog may bite. Considerable effort has been put in to describing this aspect of dog behaviour, whereby it can now be broken down into two conditions: right-biased tail wagging, and left-biased tail wagging. Research has demonstrated that dogs display asymmetric tail wagging as a result of distinctive emotional stimuli.

=== Right-biased tail wagging ===
Right-biased tail wags are ones biased to the right side of a dog's body, as viewed from the rear. Studies show that dogs were relaxed when presented with a conspecific showing right-biased tail wagging, illustrating right-biased tail wagging as communicating positive feelings, or demonstrate an approach response. Moreover, dogs show this tail-wagging behaviour upon presentation of their owner.

=== Left-biased tail wagging ===
Left-biased tail wags are ones biased to the left side of a dog's body, as viewed from the rear. Dogs that were presented with a conspecific displaying this tail wagging behaviour were more stressed (revealed through heightened cardiac activity as well as behaviour) in comparison to dogs presented with conspecifics showing right-biased tail wagging behaviour. This increased emotional response suggest that left-biased tail wagging communicates negative feelings, or demonstrates a withdrawal response. Furthermore, dogs show this tail wagging behaviour in the presence of an unfamiliar, dominant conspecific.

=== Slow versus high-speed ===
A slow-wagging tail is quite different than a high-speed wagging tail. The former display commonly denotes a less social signal, whereas the latter often signifies sociality in dogs.

== Body position ==
Analysing a dog's body as a whole unit is important in determining a dog's emotions. A standing, upright position can indicate dominance, or suggests aggression if the body is stiff. A withdrawn body position with weight distributed to the hind end of a dog suggests fear. The difference between active submission and passive submission can be discerned based on a dog's posture; active submission is demonstrated by keeping the body low to the ground, while passive submission is demonstrated by lying on the ground with the underbelly exposed.

A dog can alter its body position so that the front of the body is in a crouched position with the front legs lower than the back legs. This can indicate a higher level of aggression that can be the precursor to an attack. If this position is accompanied by snarling, a wrinkled nose, dilated pupils, the tail tucked under the body and between the back legs, and raised hair along the dog's back, the dog is highly aggressive and fearful. In comparison, submissiveness may be revealed by lowering the body or rolling onto the side, revealing the underbelly.

== Specific behaviours ==
A variety of behaviours exhibited by dogs can be interpreted to convey certain emotions. A well-known behaviour associated with playful moods in dogs is known as a play bow, where a dog lowers its forelimbs and chest while raising its hind end and wagging its tail. This may be followed with other playful actions, such as bouncing movements and face pawing. In young dogs, urination can be a behaviour associated with submission. This occurs when eye contact is made between a dog and its owner, followed by the dog urinating in an attempt to gain approval. Depending on the dog, breed, and environment, these actions can vary and are frequently instinctive. Knowing these indicators can make it easier for pet owners to interact with their animals and identify when a dog is pleased, anxious, or threatened.

== Common emotional states ==
A relaxed dog will display upward ear position, with the tail positioned downward. In comparison, an anxious or fearful dog will display a tense body posture, backward position of the ears, head turning, and/or lip smacking. The tail may also be tucked between the hind legs. Finally, an aggressive dog will display a stiff tail (which may be wagging slowly), a forward ear position, as well as a wrinkled nose. If these characteristics are present, it is very important to respond accordingly in order to avoid attack. Aggression may occur if an inappropriate response is made following warning signals. For example, children often misinterpret the body language of dogs, especially when such motions precede an aggressive behaviour. The calming signals are often not noticed or not interpreted correctly to recognize early signs of stress in a dog. As a result of these misinterpretations, children are most often the victims of dog bites.

Puppies have other postures that disappear as the dog ages. They can play roughly with their litter mates while rarely drawing blood. The mother remains very tolerant when the puppies chew on her.

== Guides to assessing stress ==
Several visual guides have been developed to recognise and interpret canine stress. They are used to educate personnel who work with dogs, including veterinary personnel, as well as dog owners. Some of these guides specifically target veterinary clinics, shelters, and grooming facilities as a way to help guide decision-making during visits.

The "low stress handling algorithm for dogs" and the "spectrum of fear, anxiety and stress" were developed specifically with the veterinary clinic in mind to guide decisions during a veterinary visit. Both use the comparison of a traffic light: behaviours in the green zone indicate a relaxed or very mildly stressed dog and what is being done can be continued; behaviours in the yellow or orange zone indicate a more stressed dog, where there needs to be careful consideration of alternatives and persistent vigilance for changes; red behaviours indicate that what is being done needs to stop and a new plan is needed, for example rescheduling or using sedation.

The "ladder of aggression" uses the metaphor of a ladder to illustrate how stress can escalate: the lowest steps show subtle stress signals such as nose licking and yawning, while the higher steps represent increasingly overt stress behaviours, with the top step describing overt aggression such as snapping and biting.

== Types of cues ==
=== Behavioural cues ===
Behavioral cues are simply signals that are communicated through the behavior of a dog. These include specific movements involving the body posture, the ears, the head/eyes, and the tail. Behavioral cues are simply assessing the movements of a dog, without considering the emotions and/or intentions underlying such movements. For example, tail wagging is a behavioral cue.

=== Holistic cues ===
Holistic cues are approximate evaluations of the observed overall state of the animal. Holistic cues can be subdivided into two categories: emotional, and intentional. Consistent with recent research that suggests a dog's ability to feel happy, angry, or sad, emotional cues intend to describe the dog's feelings regarding a certain situation. For example, assuming that a dog is fearful based primarily on the position of the tail. Intentional cues are ones that are expressed through body language that communicate the overall intention of the dog. These are cues that reveal why the animal is acting a certain way. For example, the display of a play-bow posture may be described as occurring in order to initiate play (an intention).

=== Other ===
Other cues are any type of cue that is not behavioral or holistic. These include miscellaneous cues, or the overall absence of cues.

== Learning achievement ==
Understanding and properly interpreting the characteristics displayed by dogs during learning can significantly aid in successive obedience training. As human-dog interactions occur quite frequently, a lack of obedience training can lead to unwanted behavioural problems. Thus, it is very important for effective training to occur.

Successful training in dogs requires the owner/trainer to be able to correctly interpret the learning abilities of the dog. It is well established that body language can reveal emotions and moods of dogs, which can be quite helpful when assessing dogs during training.

Studies have shown that the obedience training of domestic dogs can be explained using operant conditioning methods. Like humans, concentration as well as motivation must be present in order for learning to occur. Therefore, understanding the dog's motivation and emotional states may result in more successful training. Attention to others can be assessed in dogs by measuring the amount of eye contact made with the trainer, as well as the position of the ears. It has been found that dogs that make eye contact with the trainer, as well as display a forward ear position, are most successful in learning achievement during operant conditioning.
