= Wag Islands =

Island group in Nunavut, Canada

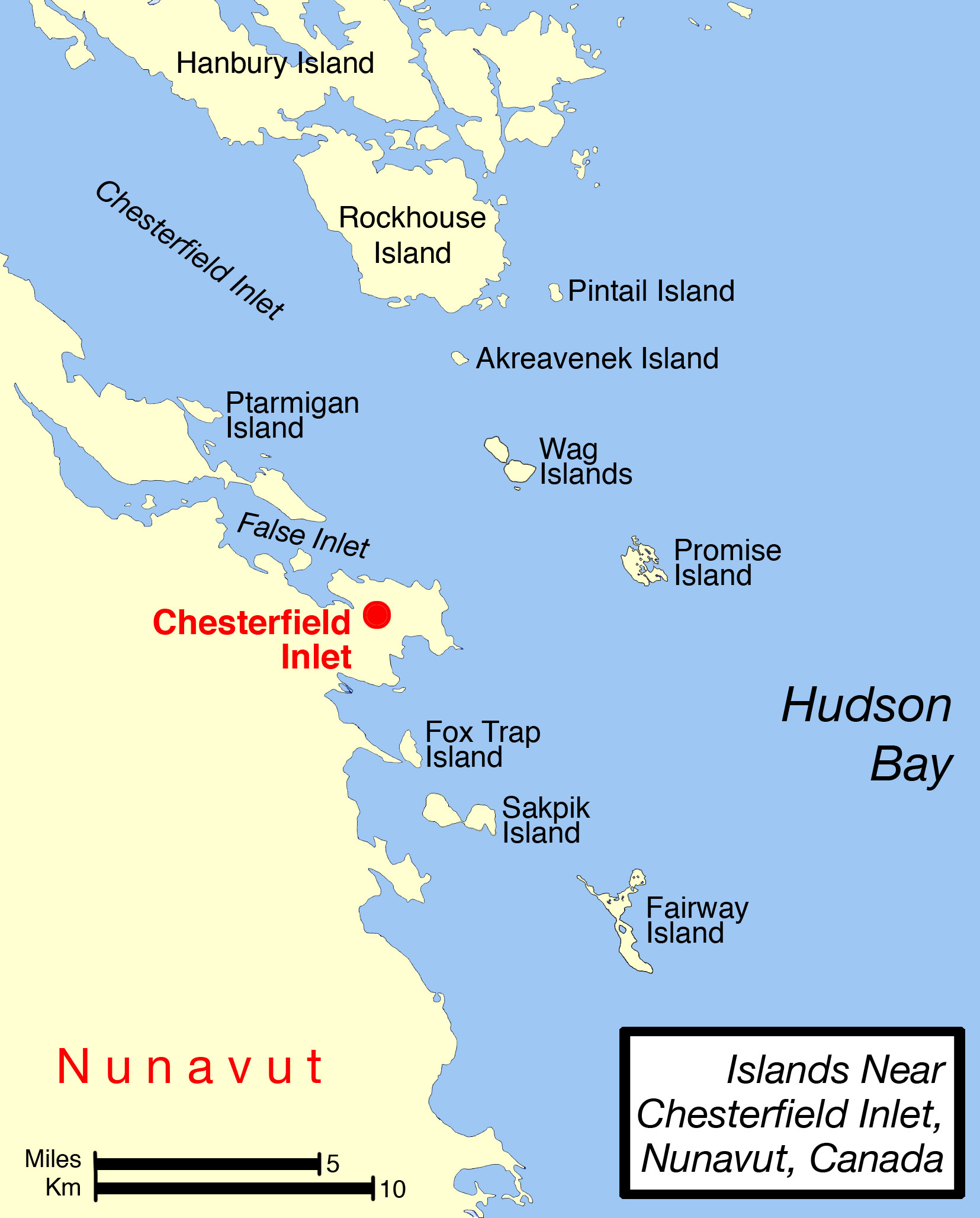
- Wag Islands within the mouth of Chesterfield Inlet.

- Location within Nunavut Location within Canada

Geography
- Location: Chesterfield Inlet
- Coordinates: 63.38°N 90.63°W
- Archipelago: Arctic Archipelago

Administration
- Canada
- Nunavut: Nunavut
- Region: Kivalliq

Demographics
- Population: Uninhabited

The Wag Islands are an uninhabited Canadian arctic islands group in Kivalliq Region, Nunavut, Canada. They are irregularly shaped and are located at the mouth of Chesterfield Inlet. The Inuit hamlet of Chesterfield Inlet is located 6.3 km (3.9 mi) to the south.
