= Daniel Kelaart =

Australian musical artist (born 1986)

- Born: 6 January 1986 (age 40); Melbourne
- Genres: Rock, pop
- Occupation: Singer-songwriter
- Instruments: Guitar, drums, vox
- Website: www.facebook.com/danielkelaart

Daniel Kelaart (born 6 January 1986) is an Australian singer-songwriter and record producer. He is the frontman of the pop rock band Remission Theory. He has also worked as an independent record producer, where he has produced, engineered, mixed or written tracks for bands including For Our Hero, The Paperkites, Simple Plan, Antiskeptic, Declan Sykes, Michael Paynter, Have You Seen This Boy, Hometown, Dylan Joel, and Delamare.
