= Tail wagging by dogs =

Dog behaviour

A dog wags her tail.

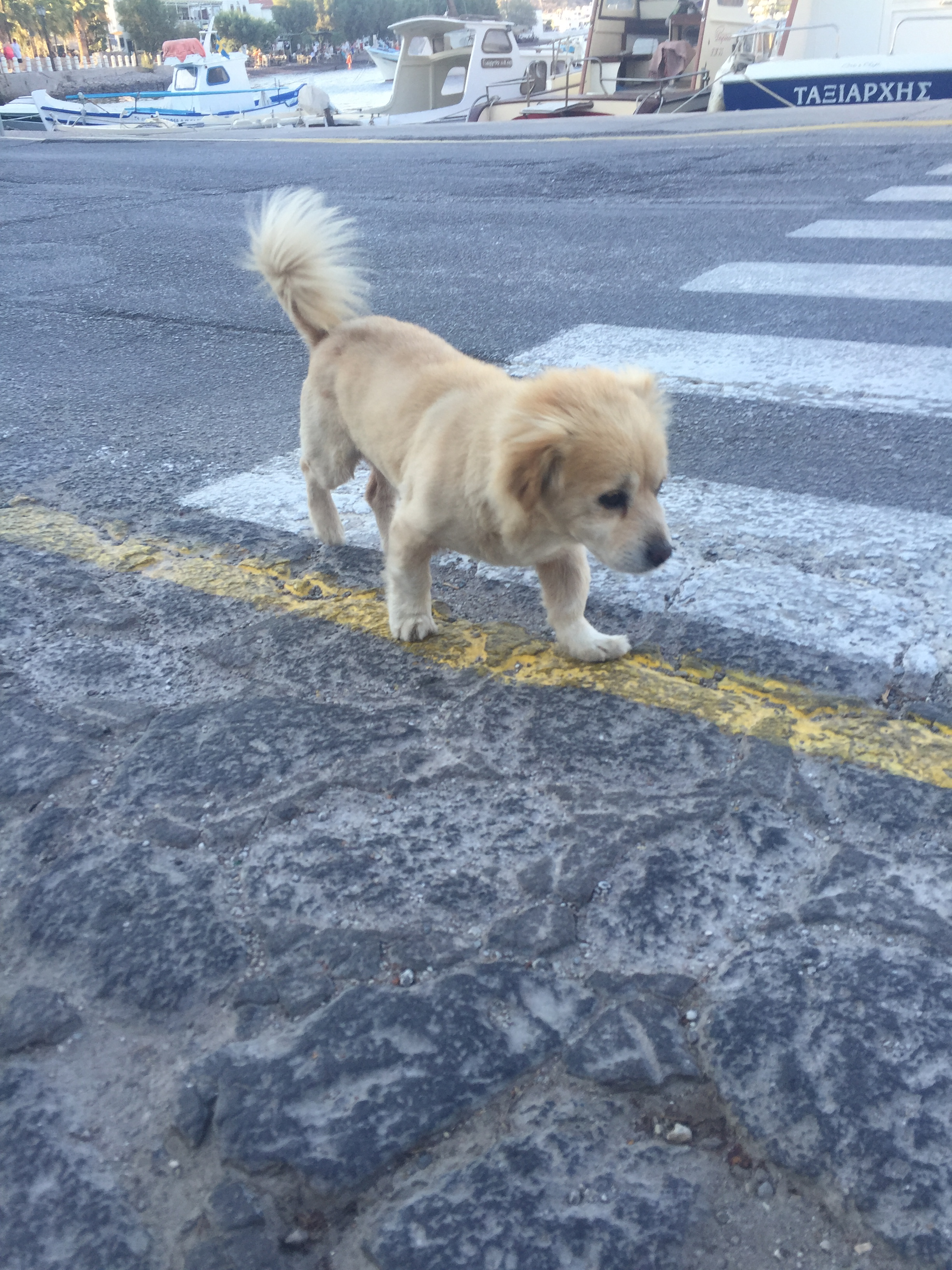
Small yellow dog with its tail held at maximum height.

Tail wagging is the behavior of the dog observed as its tail moves back and forth in the same plane. Within Canidae, specifically Canis lupus familiaris, the tail plays multiple roles, which can include balance, and communication. It is considered a social signal. The behaviour can be categorized by vigorous movement or slight movement of the tip of the tail. Tail wagging can also occur in circular motions, and when the tail is held at maximum height, neutral height, or between the legs.

Tail wagging can be used as a social signal within species and convey the emotional state of the dog. The tail wagging behavior of a dog may not always be an indication of its friendliness or happiness, as is commonly believed. Though indeed tail wagging can express positive emotions, tail wagging is also an indication of fear, insecurity, challenging of dominance, establishing social relationships, or a warning that the dog may bite. It is also important to consider the way in which the dog wags its tail: speed, height and position. Usually positive feelings within a dog are associated with the right side. For instance, if a dog is about to receive a treat, their tail will likely move with a bias towards its right. On the other hand, negative feelings are typically connected with a bias towards its left side. If a dog is being approached by another dog and feels threatened, the dog's tail will usually move more to its left.

One hypothesis states that the asymmetries are actually evolved and are kept as evolutionarily stable strategies, that aid dogs in detecting when they should interact with each other. The direction, as well as height and width of the tail wag, can convey important cues about the social condition of the animal. Different colourations and patterns, contrasting tip are likely evolved to improve communication with the tail.

Tail wagging functions as the equivalent of a human smile. It is a greeting or an acknowledgment of recognition. Dogs tend not to wag their tails unless there is another animal or human nearby with whom to interact.

== Position of the tail ==
The position in which a dog holds its tail is indicative of the emotional state of the animal. When the tail is held at maximum height it is a demonstration of dominance and can also indicate a positive demeanour. A tail held at medium height can indicate interest in the dog's surroundings. Dogs may hold their tails low or even beneath them when presented with a stressful situation. The low height of the tail demonstrates submission and fear. These traits remain constant across most breeds.

== Side bias of tail wags ==
Dogs exhibit a striking side bias of tail wags when encountered with different situations. Typically, when dogs are encountered with positive situations, like encountering their owner, dogs will wag their tail towards the right. However, when dogs are faced with negative situations, such as the approach of an unfamiliar dog, the animal biases its tail wags towards the left.

Additionally, dogs exhibit a decrease in wagging movements when presented with stressful situations, however, there is an increased frequency of tail wags when the dog is at ease or is excited.

== Canine interpretation of tail wags ==
Dogs respond to the tail wags presented by others of their species, and dogs seldom wag their tails while they are alone. Different colourations and patterns, like contrasting tips, are likely evolved to facilitate communication with the tail. Dogs interpret tail cues differently depending on the length of the tail, as well as the size of the dog interpreting and expressing the behaviour. Dogs are more likely to approach other dogs with long tails when they exhibit wagging behaviour. They are less likely to approach dogs with short tails, even if they exhibit the same wagging behaviour. This may be because it is easier to interpret the social cues expressed by a longer tail, compared to a short one.

Furthermore, dogs exhibit more favourably to long wagging tails and exhibit less aggressive behaviour. The tail is commonly docked in almost one-third of all recognized domestic breeds. Therefore, short tail dogs may experience more aggressive attacks than their long tail counterparts.

When dogs view other dogs exhibiting a right side bias they present an increase in cardiac activity and display increased stress like activity, this is suggestive of tail wagging conveying emotionally important information.

== Lateralization of function ==
The side bias of dog tail wags suggests a brain hemisphere lateralization that control the movement of the tail. Tail wags biased to the right are controlled by the left hemisphere, while left biased wags are controlled by the right hemisphere. Therefore, there exists a cross-over of descending motor pathways in dogs. The rubrospinal tract is the primary pathway from the brain to the spinal cord. The pathway crosses just caudal of the red nucleus and descends in the contralateral lateral funiculus. Fibres of the rubrospinal tract then terminate on interneurons at all levels of the spinal cord. The right hemisphere of the brain controls withdrawal responses, while the left side controls approach responses. This could be the reason for side bias of tail wags in different emotive situations.

== See also ==
- Dog communication
- Body language of dogs
- Wag the dog
